= List of Milton Bradley Company products =

Logo of the company

This is a list of products produced by the Milton Bradley Company.

== Board games ==
- 13 Dead End Drive (1993)
- The Adventures of Superman (1940)
  - Superman and Superboy Game (1967)
  - Superman II (1981)
- Aggravation (1962)
- The American Dream Game (1979)
- The American Heritage historical war-game series:
  - Battle Cry, American Civil War (1961)
  - Broadside, War of 1812 naval (1962)
  - Dogfight, World War I aerial (1963)
  - Hit the Beach, World War II amphibious (1965)
  - Skirmish, American Revolution (1975)
- The Amazing Spider-Man Game with the Fantastic Four! (1967)
  - Spider-Man game (1995)
- Animorphs: The Invasion Game (1998)
- Annie Oakley Game (1950)
- Ants in the Pants (1969)
- Ask Me Another (1984)
- Axis & Allies (1981)
- The Baby-Sitters Club Game (1989)
- Back Off! Buzzard (1990)
- Backgammon Tutor (1975)
- Bali (1978)
- Baretta (1976)
- Bargain Hunter (1981)
- The Barnabas Collins Dark Shadows Game (1969)
- Barrel of Monkeys (1965)
- Bash! (1965)
- Baseball: Approved by Little League for Little Leaguers and their Fathers (1958)
- The Batman Game (1966)
- Battle Cry: A Civil War Game (American Heritage magazine) 1961-1965
- Battle Masters (1992), produced in conjunction with Games Workshop
- Battleship (1967)
- Battleship Galaxies (2011)
- Bed Bugs (1985)
- Beetle (a.k.a. Cootie) (1927)
- Beetle Bailey: The Old Army Game (1963)
- Benji Detective Game (1979)
- Bermuda Triangle (1976)
- Big Foot (1977)
- The Bonkers Game (1993)
- Bradley's Toy Money Complete with Game of Banking
- Bratz Passion for Fashion (2002)
- Breaker19 (1976)
- Broadside (American Heritage magazine) 1961-1965
- Buckaroo! (1970)
  - Yahoo Buckaroo! (1991)
- Buffy the Vampire Slayer: The Game (2000)
- Bugaloos Game (1971)
- Camp Granada (1965)
- Candy Land (1949)
- The Captain America Game (1966)
  - Captain America Game (Featuring the Falcon and the Avengers) (1977)
- Carrier Strike (1977)
- Casino Bingo (1978)
- Casper the Friendly Ghost Game (1959)
- Catnip (1996)
- Championship Baseball (1984)
- Charlie's Angels (1977)
- Checkout Game: 4 Square Food-Market Shopping Game (1959)
- Cheyenne (1958)
- Chicken Limbo (1994)
- The Chronicles of Narnia: The Lion, The Witch and The Wardrobe Game (2005)
- Choo-Choo aka Shuffle (1977)
- Chutes and Ladders VCR (1986)
- Clix (1938)
- Columbo Detective Game (1973)
- Connect Four (1974)
  - Connect 4x4 (2009)
- Conspiracy (1973)
- Cootie (1949)
- Crack The Case (1993)
- Crash Canyon (1989)
- Crocodile Dentist (1990)
- The Crocodile Hunter Outback Chase Game (2000)
- Cross Up (1974)
- Cross Up Poker (1968)
- Crossfire (1971)
- Crossword (1978)
- Curse of the Idol (1990)
- The Dark Crystal Game (1982)
- Dark Tower (1981)
- Daytona 500 (1990)
- Deflection (1981)
- Disney board game series:
  - 101 Dalmatians Game (1991)
  - Aladdin: The Magic Carpet Game (1992)
  - Aladdin: The Series (1994)
  - The Bonkers Game (1993)
  - Chip'n Dale: Rescue Rangers Game (1991)
  - Cinderella Storybook (puzzle game) (1989)
  - Darkwing Duck Game (1992)
  - Disney Presents Cartoon Classics VCR Board Game (1986)
  - Disney Presents Movie Classics VCR Board Game (1980)
  - Disney Princess Gowns & Crowns Game (2005)
  - Disney's All Aboard Game (1986)
  - Disney's Beauty and the Beast (1991)
  - Disney's DuckTales Game (1989)
  - Disney's The Hunchback of Notre Dame Festival of Fools Card Game (1996)
  - Disney's The Lion King Circle of Life Dominoes (2003)
  - Disney's Talespin Game (1991)
  - Dr. Busby (1905)
  - Euro Disneyland (1992)
  - Follow That Mouse (1986)
  - Gettin' Goofy Game (1992)
  - The Lion King (1993)
  - The Lion King Matching Game (1994)
  - The Little Mermaid (1990)
  - Mickey Mouse & Friends Light & Learn
  - Mickey Mouse Follow the Leader Game (1971)
  - Mickey Mouse Memory Game (1990)
  - Mickey Mouse Spin-A-Round Game
  - Mickey's Stuff For Kids Hoppin' Checkers (1993)
  - Pinocchio Game (1992)
  - Pocahontas Game (1994)
  - Spinning Wishes (2002)
  - Walt Disney Productions' Robin Hood Game (1973)
  - Walt Disney Rescue Rangers
  - Walt Disney World Magic Kingdom Game (1972)
  - Walt Disney's Snow White And The Seven Dwarfs Game (1992)
- Dogfight (American Heritage magazine) (1961-1965)
- Domination (1982)
- Don't Break the Ice (1968)
- Don't Spill the Beans (1957)
- Double Frustration (1995)
- Doubletrack (1981)
- Down the Hatch (1983)
- Downfall (1973)
- Dragon Strike (2002)
- Dragonmaster (1981)
- Dragster (1976)
- Drive Ya Nuts (1970)
- Ea$y Money
- Easy Money (1966)
- El Tigre Crucificado (Colombia) (1983)
- Electronic Arcade Mania (1983)
- The Emergency! Game (1973)
- Enchanted Palace (1994-1995)
- Fat Chance (1978)
- Feeley Meeley (1967)
- Felix the Cat Game (1960)
- Fireball Island (1986)
- Fishin' Around (1997)
- Five Star Final (1937)
- The Flintstones Game (1971)
- Flivver Game (1922)
- Forbidden Bridge (1992)
- Fraggle Rock Game (1984)
- Fraidy Cats (1994)
- Frantic Frogs (1965)
- Frog Tennis (2002)
- Frustration! (A.K.A. Trouble) (1965)
- The Gamemaster series:
  - Axis and Allies (1984)
  - Broadsides and Boarding Parties (1984)
  - Conquest of the Empire (1984)
  - Fortress America (1986)
  - Shogun (1986)
- G.I. Joe Adventure Board Game (1982)
  - G.I. Joe Combat Fighters (2002)
  - G.I. Joe Commando Attack (1985)
  - G.I. Joe Live The Adventure (1986)
  - G.I. Joe Mission: Cobra H.Q. Game (2002)
- Game of Games (1986)
- The Game of Guided Missile (1964)
- The Game of Life:
  - The Checkered Game of Life (1860)
  - Game of Life (1978)
  - Game of Life (1992)
  - Game of Life (2000)
  - The Game of Life 100th Anniversary Game (1963)
  - Game of Life - A Jedi's Path (2002)
  - Game of Life - Pirates of the Caribbean (2004)
  - Game of Life - Pirates of the Caribbean: Dead Man's Chest (2006)
  - Game of Life - Twists and Turns (2007)
- Game of the States (copyright 1940)
- Ghosts! (1980)
- Giant Steps (1957)
- Go For Broke (1965)
- Go! Go! Worms (1993)
- Go to the Head of the Class (1936)
- Godzilla (1998)
- Good Ol' Charlie Brown Game (1971)
- The Goonies game (1985)
- Goosebumps: A Night in Terror Tower Game (1996)
- Goosebumps: One Day at Horrorland Game (1996)
- Goosebumps: Terror in the Graveyard Game (1995)
- Guess Who? (1982)
- Guess Where? (year)
- Hands Down (1988)
- Hang in There! (2000)
- Hangman (1976)
- Happiness (1972)
- The Harlem Globetrotters Game (1971)
- Headache (1968), first published by Kohner Brothers
- Heads Up
- HeartThrob (1988)
- HeroQuest (1989), produced in conjunction with Games Workshop
- HeroScape (2004)
- High School Musical 3 Mystery Date Game (2008)
- Hit the Beach (American Heritage magazine) 1961-1965
- The Hobbit: The Adventures of Bilbo in Middle-earth from The Lord of the Rings (1978)
- Hopalong Cassidy Game (1950)
- Hotel (1986)
- Hotel Tycoon (1974)
- The Houndcats Game (1973)
- Huckleberry Hound (1981)
- Huckleberry Hound Tiddledy Winks Tennis (1959)
- Huckleberry Hound Western Game (1959)
- Hungry Hungry Hippos (1978)
- I Dream Of Jeannie (1965)
- Ice Cube (1972)
- Input (1984)
- Inwords (1972)
- Itsy Bitsy Spider (2002)
- It from the Pit (1992)
- James Bond Secret Agent 007 Game (1964)
  - James Bond 007: Goldfinger (1966)
  - James Bond 007: Thunderball (1965)
- Jenga (1986)
  - Jenga Casino (2001)
  - Jenga Jacks (2002)
  - Jenga Truth-or-Dare (2000)
  - Jenga Ultimate (1995)
  - Jenga Xtreme (2003)
  - Throw 'n Go Jenga (1986)
- Jogo X-Men (1996)
- Jumanji (1995)
- Jurassic Park Game (1993)
  - Jurassic Park III Island Survival Game (2001)
  - Jurassic Park III: The Spinosaurus Chase Game (2001)
  - The Lost World Jurassic Park Game (1996)
- Karate Fighters (1995)
- KerPlunk (1967)
- Kick-Off (a.k.a. Gazza! The Game) (1960)
- King Leonardo and His Subjects Game (1965)
- King Oil (1974)
- Knock 'em Out (1980)
- Knock Knock Game (1982)
- Knockout (1991)
- KooKooNauts (1995)
- Kreskin's ESP (1967)
- Laser Attack (1978)
- Last Word (1986)
- Link Letters (1963)
- Little Orphan Annie (1927)
- Little Orphan Annie Travel Game (1930)
- Littlest Pet Shop (1993)
- Littlest Pet Shop Game (2005)
- Littlest Pet Shop Game: Prettiest Pet Show (2005)
- Littlest Pet Shop: Hideaway Haven Game (2008)
- Littlest Pet Shop Mall Madness (2008)
- Loopin' Louie (1992)
- Lost in Space (1965)
- Lucy's Tea Party Game (1971)
- Mall Madness (1988)
  - Electronic Mall Madness (1989)
  - Littlest Pet Shop Mall Madness (2008)
- Mall Madness (1993)
- The Man from U.N.C.L.E. Card Game (1965)
- Manhunt (1972)
- Maniac Mouse (1993)
- Marvel Comics Super Heroes Strategy Game (1980)
- Matching Pairs (1981)
- Matchwitz (1970)
- Max Backtalk (1986)
- Memory (1966)
- Men into Space (1960)
- Mighty Morphin Power Rangers Game (1994)
- Milton the Monster (1966)
- Mission Command Air (2003)
- Mission Command Land (2003)
- Mission Command Sea (2003)
- The Monster Squad Game (1977)
- The Moon Mullins Game (1938)
- Mother's Helper (1968)
- Mouse Trap (1963)
- Mr. Pop! (1980)
- Mr. T (1983)
- My First Operation (2002)
- My Little Pony Game (1988)
- My Little Pony Hide & Seek (2005)
- Mystery Date (1965)
- Mystery Mansion (1984)
- New Kids on the Block Game (1990)
- Official Baseball Game (1969)
- Omega Virus (1992)
- Oodles (1992)
- Operation (1965)
- The Outer Limits (1964)
- Pachisi (400)
- Park and Shop (1954)
- The Partridge Family Game (1971)
- Pass the Pigs (1977)
- Pathfinder (1974)
- Pathfinder (1977)
- Perfection (1973)
- Picnic Panic (1992)
- Pig Pong (1986)
- Pirate and Traveler (1908)
- Pirate and Traveler game (1911)
- Planet of the Apes (1974)
- Polar Dare! (1991)
- Police Chase (2002)
- Popeye (1981)
- Posse Thirteen Against One (1970)
- Pow! (1964)
- Power Barons (1986)
- Prize Property (1974)
- Pretty Pretty Princess (1990)
- Rack-O (1956)
- Ready! Set! Spaghetti! (1989)
- Real Ghostbusters Game (1984)
- The Real Ghostbusters Game (1986)
- Richie Rich (1982)
- Road Runner Game (1968)
- Rock the Boat (1978)
- Rock 'Em Sock 'Em Robots (1967)
- Rock-Jocks (1994)
- Sailor Moon (1995)
- Scattergories (1988)
  - Scattergories Junior (1989)
- Scavenger Hunt (1983)
- Scotland Yard (1985)
- Screaming Eagles (1987)
- Sealab 2020 (1973)
- Seance (1972)
- The Shadow (1994)
- Shark Attack (1988)
- Shenanigans Game (1964)
- Shogun (1986)
- Shop (1981)
- Shrunken Head Apple Sculpture (1975)
- Shuffle aka Choo-Choo(1977)
- Sleepytime (1974)
- Slide 5 (1980)
- Smuggle (1981)
- The Smurf Game (1981)
  - Baby Smurf (1984)
  - The Smurf Game (1988)
  - The Smurf Game Happy-time Picture Matching (1983)
  - Smurf Spin-A-Round Game (1983)
- Snakes and Ladders (-200)
- Somali (The Game of Mill) (1939), submitted by game owner, extremely rare: no other references found anywhere
- Space: 1999 (1976)
- Space Crusade (1990), produced in conjunction with Games Workshop
- Spider Wars (1988)
- Splat! (1990)
- Spy vs Spy (1986)
- Square Mile (1962)
- Star Trek Game (1979)
  - Star Trek: The Next Generation - A Klingon Challenge (1993)
- Star Wars Epic Duels (2002)
- Stay Alive (1965)
- Stratego (board game) series:
  - Stratego (1947)
  - Electronic Stratego (1982)
  - Stratego (Revised Edition) (2008)
  - Stratego: The Chronicles of Narnia (2005)
  - Stratego: Duel Masters (2004)
  - Stratego: The Lord of the Rings (2004)
  - Stratego: Pirates of the Caribbean at World's End (2007)
  - Stratego: Star Wars (2002)
  - Stratego: Star Wars Saga Edition (2005)
  - Stratego: Transformers (2007)
- Stuff Yer Face (1982)
- Stump (1968)
- Sub Attack Game (1966)
- Sub Search (1973)
- Sunken Treasure (1976)
- Super 3 (1978)
- Super Rack-O (1983)
- Supercar (1962)
- Swayze (1954)
- Sweet Valley High (1988)
- Tank Battle (1975)
- T.H.I.N.G.S.: Totally Hilarious Incredibly Neat Games of Skill (1987)
  - Astro-Nots (1987)
  - Dr.Wack-O (1987)
  - E-E-Egor (1987)
  - Eggzilla (1987)
  - Flip-O-Potamus (1987)
  - Go-Rilla (1987)
  - Grabbit (1987)
  - Jack B. Timber (1987)
  - Sir Ring-A-Lot (1987)
- Teenage Mutant Ninja Turtles Game (2003)
- Teenage Mutant Ninja Turtles: Pizza Power Game (1987)
- This Game is Bonkers!
- Thundarr The Barbarian (1982)
- Thunder Road (1986)
- Thundercats (1985)
- Time Bomb! (1964)
- Times To Remember (1991)
- Tommy Twinkles Number Game (1923)
- Torpedo Run! (1986)
- Tower Climb (1971)
- The Transformers Game (1986)
- The Transformers Warrior Robot Game (1985)
- Trouble (1965)
- Tuba Ruba (1987)
- Trump: The Game (1989)
- Turbo Asticot (1994)
- Twister (1966)
  - Animal Twister (1967)
  - Bratz Twister (2005)
- Uncle Wiggily (1916)
- Underdog Game (1964)
- Upwords (1983)
- Vampire Hunter (2002)
- Voice of the Mummy (1971)
- Voyage to the Bottom of the Sea Game (1964)
- The Wacky Races Game (1969)
- Weapons & Warriors: Castle Combat Set (1993)
- Where's The Beef? (1984)
- Which Witch? (game) (1970s)
- Whirl Out (1971)
- Why (1958)
- Wide World of Sports Auto Racing Game (1975)
- Wide World of Sports Golf Game (1975)
- Wide World of Sports Tennis Game (1975)
- Win A Card (1969)
- Wizzword (1977)
- The World of Micronauts Game (1978)
- Wow! (1964)
- Yahtzee (1956, MB from 1973)
  - Casino Yahtzee (1986)
  - Challenge Yahtzee (1974)
  - Family Game Night Book and Game Set: Scrabble, Clue, Sorry, Yahtzee (2001)
  - Jackpot Yahtzee (1980)
  - Mickey Mouse Yahtzee (1988)
  - Showdown Yahtzee (1991)
  - Triple Yahtzee (1972)
  - Word Yahtzee (1978)
  - Yahtzee Deluxe Poker (1994)
  - Yahtzee: Dragon Ball Z (2000)
  - Yahtzee Jr. (2002)
- Yogi Bear Game (1971)

== Jigsaw Puzzles ==
Movie Poster (500 Piece) Puzzles
MB Product Code	Description
4057-1	Indiana Jones and the Last Crusade (1989)
4057-2	Karate Kid Part III, The (1989)
4057-3	Ghostbusters II (1989)
4057-4	Beetlejuice (1988)
4057-5	Police Academy 6 (1989)
4057-6	Batman (1989)
4057-7	Back To The Future Part II (1989)
4057-8	Jetsons (1990)
4057-10	Total Recall (1990)
4057-11	Jaws (1975)
4057-12	Memphis Belle (1990)
4057-13	Kindergarten Cop (1990)
4057-14	Home Alone (1990)
4057-15	Bonfire of the Vanities, The (1990)
4273	Batman Returns (1992)
4286	Terminator 2 (1991)
4265	Home Alone 2: Lost in New York - 300 pc. (1992)

== Handheld and electronic games ==
- Bigtrak (1979)
- Bop It (1996)
  - Bop It Bounce! (2009)
- Comp IV (1978)
- Electronic Battleship (1977)
  - Electronic Battleship Advanced Mission (2000)
  - Electronic Battleship Advanced Mission (second edition) (aka Deluxe Battleship Movie Edition) (2006)
  - Electronic Battleship: Star Wars (aka Battleship: Star Wars Advanced Mission) (2002)
  - Electronic Talking Battleship (1989)
- Electronic Stratego (1982)
- Elefun (1994)
- Fang Bang (1967)
- Gator Golf (1994)
- Grand Master (1982)
- Heads Up (2000)
- Lolli Plop (1962)
- Merlin (1978)
- Milton (1980)
- Mr. Bucket (1992)
- OMNI Entertainment System (1980)
- Simon (1978)
  - Super Simon (1979)
  - Pocket Simon (1980)
  - Simon Squared (2000)
  - Simon Stix (2004)
  - Simon Trickster (2005)
- Skill-it (Frying pan maze) (1966)
- Split Second
- Star Bird (1978)
- Waterfuls (1987-1990s)
- Yahtzee

== Home versions of television game shows ==
- Beat the Clock (1969, two editions)
- Big Numbers: The High Rollers Game (1975, two editions)
- Blockbusters (1982)
- Break the Bank (1977)
- Concentration (1958, 24 editions)
- Crystal Maze (1991)
- Eye Guess (1966, four editions through 1969)
- Family Feud (1977, eight editions)
- Hollywood Squares (1980, 1986)
- Jackpot (1974, two editions)
- Jeopardy! (1964, 13 editions)
- The Joker's Wild (1973, two editions)
  - Joker! Joker! Joker! (1979, two editions)
- Let's Make a Deal (1964)
- Match Game (1963, six editions; 1974, three editions)
- Name That Tune (1957, two editions)
- Now You See It (1975)
- Password (1962, 24 editions)
  - Password Plus (1979, three editions)
- The Price is Right (1964; 1973, three editions; 1986)
- Pyramid (1974, eight editions through 1981)
- Sale of the Century (1970, two editions)
- Shenanigans (1964, two editions)
- Three on a Match (1972)
- Video Village (1960)
- Wheel of Fortune (1975, two editions)
- The Who, What, or Where Game (1970, two editions)
- Win, Lose or Draw (1987, many editions)
- You Don't Say! (1963)

== Home versions of television shows ==
- Dinosaurs Gotta Love Me (1991)
- Home and Away (1989)
- Mork & Mindy (1978)
- Tom & Jerry Chase Game (1983)

== Home versions of video games ==
- Berzerk (1983)
- Centipede (1983)
- Defender (1983)
- Donkey Kong (1982)
- Donkey Kong Country (1995)
- Frogger (1981)
- Jungle Hunt (1983)
- The Legend of Zelda (1988)
- Ms. Pac-Man Game (1982)
- Pac-Man (1980)
- Pitfall! (1983)
- Pokémon Master Trainer III (2005)
- Sonic the Hedgehog Game (1992)
- Street Fighter II (1994)
- Super Mario Bros (1988)
- Turbo (1983)
- Zaxxon (1982)

== Video games ==
- Abadox (1990) for the NES
- Cabal (1990) for the NES
- California Games (1989) for the NES
- Captain Skyhawk (1990) for the NES
- Corvette Zr-1 Challenge (1990) for the NES (European release only)
- Digger T. Rock (1990) for the NES
- Jeopardy! (1983) for the OMNI
- Jordan vs Bird: One on One (1989) for the NES
- Marble Madness (1989) for the NES
- Spitfire Attack (1983) for the Atari 2600
- Survival Run (1983) for the Atari 2600
- Time Lord (1990) for the NES
- World Games (1989) for the NES

== Video game consoles ==
- Microvision (1979)
- OMNI Entertainment System (1980)
- Vectrex (1983–84)

== Others ==
- Archie Bunker's Card Game (1972), a card game based on oh hell with suits named after characters from All in the Family
- Magic Works: a series of magic tricks; known in Japan as Magic-tainment (マジックテインメント),
