= Flip-O-Potamus =

Flip-O-Potamus is a Milton Bradley board game released in 1986. Flip-O-Potamus is part of the T.H.I.N.G.S. family of games (Totally Hilarious Incredible Neat Games of Skill).

With Flip-O-Potamus, the goal is to flip as many as possible of the eight marbles into the hippo's mouth before the spring timer stops. On the back of Flip-O-Potamus is a timer arm which is pulled counterclockwise to start the timer. As the timer goes, Flip-O-Potamus' mouth opens and closes.

== Reception ==
The New York Daily News called it "Endlessly challenging, and good, giggly fun."

The New Yorker identified the game series as "the second most popular Milton Bradley item" at the time, where children "compete with each other (time is involved) in, for example, flipping marbles into the mouth of a plastic hippopotamus before his mouth snaps closed".

The Cincinnati Post recommended it as one of the games in the series for small children "requiring little skill".
