= Play money =

Currency used in games

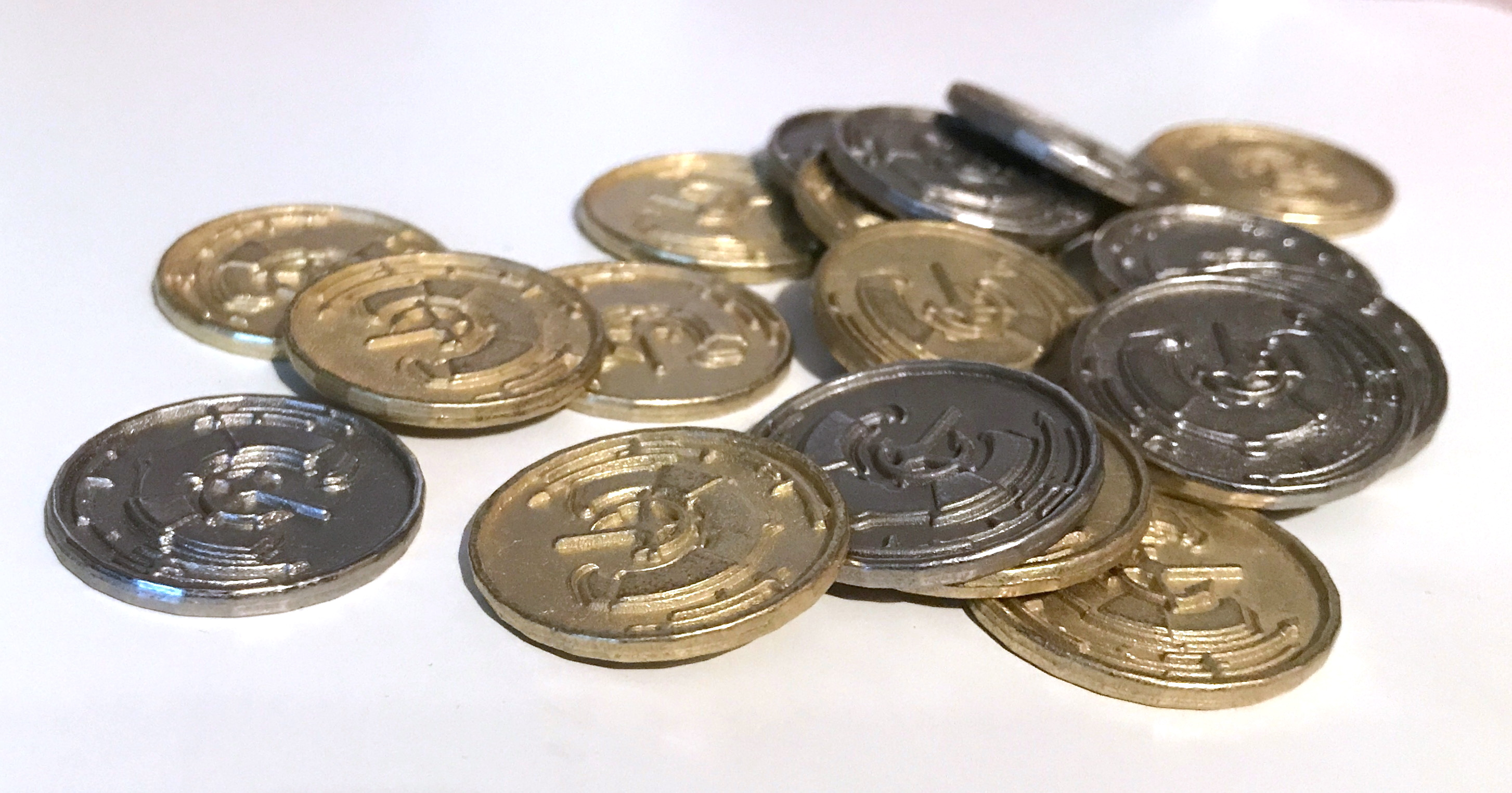
Coins from the game Century: Spice Road

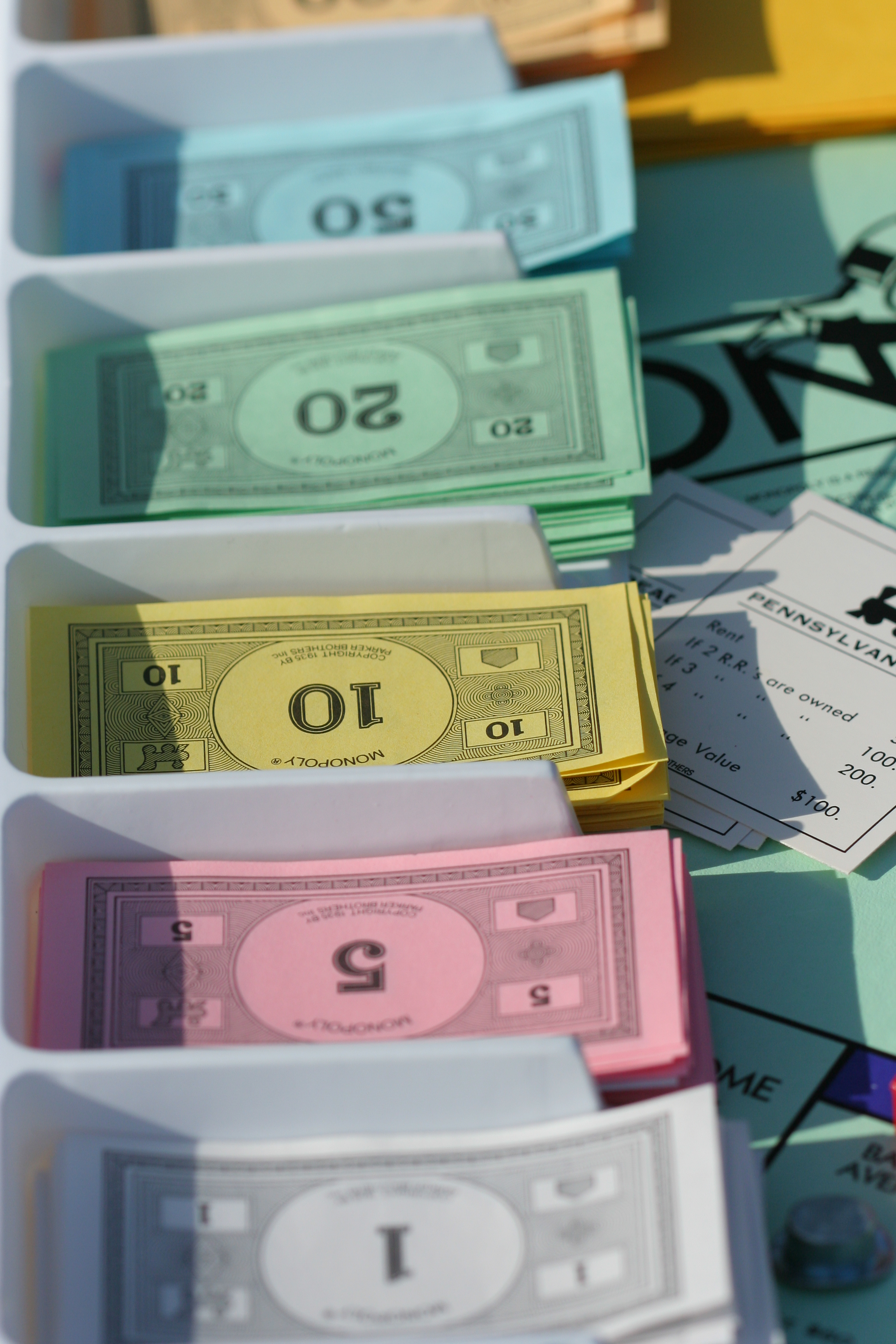
Monopoly money

Play money, toy money, faux paper money or formally ludic money is money that functions as a toy or a token in a game or when playing.

The first such toy money was printed in 1880 by the Milton Bradley Toys company, and was actually a teaching tool, distributed to schools so that children could play at commercial transactions and learn skills for reckoning change, recognizing coins, and budgeting purchases.

The rules of play money usually follow the same lines as they do for real money: counterfeiting is considered cheating at a game. Play money is a common type of game resource that can be earned, spent and lost.

Although poker chips are used in game play, the distinction between them and play money is threefold: play money is not intended to be used in gambling, play money (except for its value as a collectable item of board game paraphernalia) is not exchangeable for real currency, and play money (especially when used for teaching) tends to have some physical resemblance to actual currency.

The owners of Selchow & Righter, which sold Milton Bradley branded games, had religious objections to gambling, and went so far as to object to any gaming use of play money, rejecting any game ideas that required it, to the extent that Harriet Righter passed over the chance to acquire the rights to Monopoly.

As a form of escapism, to a fantasy world where people were not poor, games with play money were popular during the Great Depression, but their popularity waned afterwards over the decades. A further decline in popularity has occurred because inflation has placed most coins of actual currencies within the spending abilities of children, obviating the need for play money as a cheap substitute.

At its most basic level, play money refers to faux paper money, but some games can include coins, or more abstract tokens representing more generic resources (such as energy). Play money also encompasses virtual currencies in the complex in-game economies of MMORPGs, but again unlike older physical play money, in-game virtual currencies are exchangeable, to greater or lesser degree, with real currency. This has led to a whole economic system that has no analogue with physical game money, with virtual trading indexes, and currency exchange mechanisms for countries that do not accept real currencies like the United States dollar. Whereas Monopoly money is tangible and physical and only exists within an economic system controlled by a single game board, virtual currencies are intangible and exist within an economic system that spans multiple on-line games and extends to the currency of the real world.

== Games that use play paper bills ==
- Careers
- Finance
- Game of Life
- Monopoly
- Pay Day

== Games that use play coins ==
- Century: Spice Road
- Scythe

== See also ==
- Bradley's Toy Money Complete with Game of Banking
