= Cooties =

Fictional communicable disease

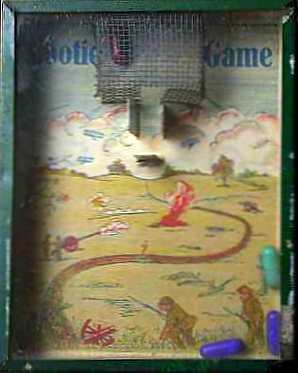
Cootie Game, a board game from 1918

Cooties is a fictitious childhood disease, commonly represented as childlore. It is used in the United States, Canada, Australia, New Zealand, and the Philippines as a rejection term and an infection tag game (such as Humans vs. Zombies). It is similar to the British "dreaded lurgi", and to terms used in the Nordic countries, in Italy, India and Iraq. A child is said to "catch" cooties through close contact with an "infected" person or from an opposite-sex child of a similar age.

== Origin ==
The word is thought to originate from the Austronesian language family, in which the Philippine, Malaysian-Indonesian, and Māori languages have the word kuto or kutu for a parasitic biting insect. However, it is equally likely the name originated from "cuties", a cynical reference to the same. The earliest recorded uses of the term in English are by British soldiers during the First World War to refer to lice that proliferated in battlefield trenches.

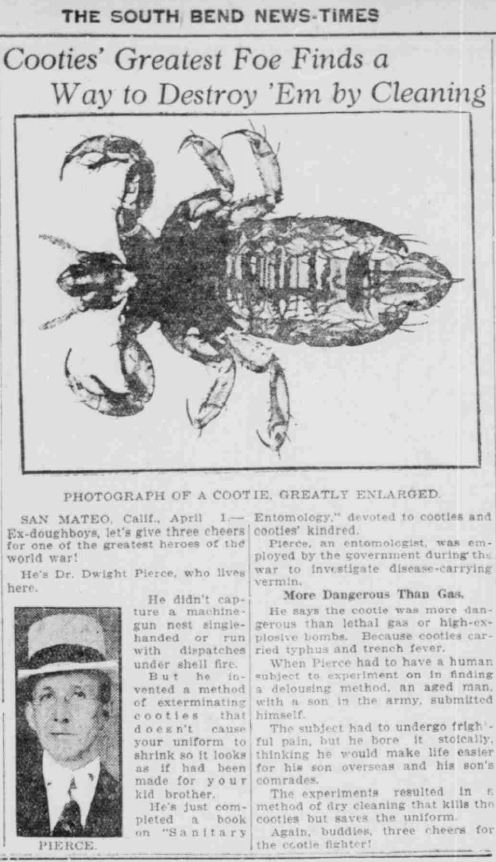
South Bend News-Times, April 7, 1922

A hand-held game, the Cootie Game, was made by the Irvin-Smith Company of Chicago in 1915; it involved tilting capsules (the cooties) into a trap over a background illustration depicting a battlefield. Other cootie games followed, all involving some form of "bug" or "cootie", until The Game of Cootie was launched in 1948 by Schaper Toys. This game was very successful, becoming an icon; in 2003, the Toy Industry Association included it on its "Century of Toys List" of the 100 most memorable and most creative toys of the 20th century.

In addition to the cooties games, the term cooties was popularised in America in the 1950s by military personnel coming back from service alongside the British in the South Pacific. Like the British 'dreaded lurgi', the cooties games developed during the early 1950s polio epidemic, and became associated with dirt and contagion.

== Other terms ==
The lice of the First World War trenches nicknamed "cooties" were also known as "arithmetic bugs" because "they added to our troubles, subtracted from our pleasures, divided our attention, and multiplied like hell."

In Italy, children have the term la peste ("the plague"). Cooties are known in Denmark as pigelus and drengelus and in Norway as jentelus and guttelus: each pair meaning literally "girl lice" and "boy lice". In Sweden they are known as tjejbaciller and killbaciller (literally "girl/boy bacilli") and in Finland they are known as the tyttöbakteeri and poikabakteeri ("girl/boy bacteria"). In Serbia the game is known as šuga; the word means scabies.

== Cooties game ==
A child is said to "catch" cooties through any form of bodily contact, proximity, or touching of an "infected" person or from a person of the opposite sex of the same age. Often the "infected" person is someone who is perceived as different, due to disability, shyness, being of the opposite sex, or having peculiar mannerisms. The phrase is most commonly used by children in elementary school aged from four to ten; however, it may be used by older children in a sarcastic or playful way.

In the United States, children sometimes "immunize" one another from cooties by administering a "cootie(s) shot". Typically, one child administers the "shot", using an index finger to trace circles and dots on another child's forearm while reciting the rhyme, "Circle, circle, Dot, dot, – Now you've got the cootie shot!" In some variations, a child then says, "Circle, circle, Square, square, – Now you have it everywhere!" In this case, the child receives an immunization throughout their body. These variations may continue to a final shot where the child says, "Circle, circle, Knife, knife, – Now you've got it all your life!". A number of other variations exist.

== See also ==
- Paper fortune teller – another name for Cootie Catcher
