= Stadium Checkers =

Board game

- Box and game
- Designers: William Herbert ("Herb") Schaper
- Publishers: Winning Moves (2004); W.H. Schaper Mfg. Co., Inc. (1952)
- Players: 2 to 4
- Setup time: 2 minutes
- Playing time: 15-30 minutes
- Chance: Low
- Age range: 8 and up

Stadium Checkers (also known as Roller Bowl) is a tabletop race game for 2 to 4 players ages 8 to adult. The object of the game is to be the first to move one's five colored marbles from the outer rim of the 'stadium' to a slot in the center of the board. The game was introduced in 1952 and originally published by W.H. Schaper Mfg. Co., Inc. In 2004, the game was republished as Roller Bowl by Winning Moves Games USA. Its original name was restored in 2007. This game is no longer in production.

== Game play ==
Players begin the game by choosing one color of marble and placing them in the start positions on the outer-most ring on the board. Starting with the start player, players take turns choosing one of the rings on the board and rotating it until one or more marbles drop to the next ring. A player cannot choose a ring to rotate that does not have marbles adjacent to it, as marbles must be made to drop by twisting the ring on a player's turn. As the marbles work towards the center chutes, players try to navigate their marbles towards their chute. If a player's marble falls into a chute that is not his own, the marble is returned to the start position on the outer-most ring of the board. The first player to get all five of their marbles into their chute in the center wins the game.
