= Mall Madness =

Board game

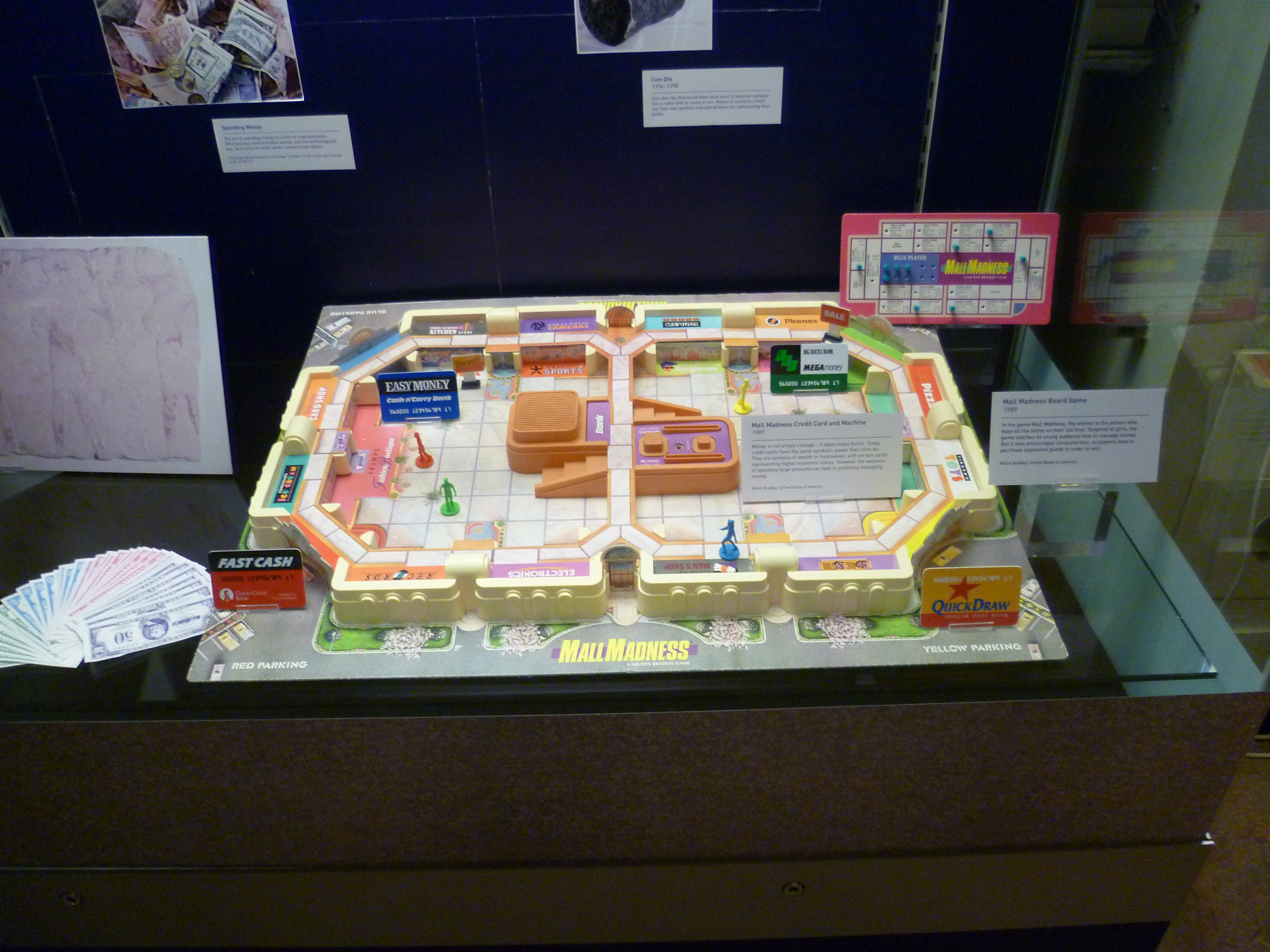
- Mall Madness (1988)
- Manufacturers: Milton Bradley
- Publishers: Hasbro
- Publication: 1988
- Years active: 1988 to Present
- Genres: Board Game
- Players: 2–4
- Setup time: 1–5 minutes
- Age range: 9+

Mall Madness is a shopping themed board game released by Milton Bradley in 1988.

An electronic talking edition was released in 1989, followed by redesigns released in 1996, 2004, and 2020.

== Objective ==
The game's objective is to be the first player to purchase six items on the player's shopping list and return to the parking lot or their final destination. This final objective varies with each new edition of the game. The original shopping list objective was increased to ten items with the release of the 1989 and 1996 editions.

== Gameplay ==
The setting for the board is a two-story shopping mall. The game is designed for two to four players. Each player receives $150 from a player who is designated as the banker. The banker dispenses cash in the following manner: one $50 bill, three $20 bills, three $10 bills, and two $5 bills. In the 1989 and 1996 versions, each player receives $200 in the following manner: two $50 bills, three $20 bills, three $10 bills, and two $5 bills. The first player presses the computer's gameplay button, which directs the player to move a random number of spaces. Players can navigate horizontally or vertically, but not diagonally. Players do not have to move the full count to enter a store and can only move into a store through its doors and not its walls. When arriving at a store, players can make purchases with their credit card by inserting it into the computer's "buy" slot. With each turn, an electronic voice announces a clearance at one store and sales at two others. Players can use these sales to their advantage to avoid using the game's ATM. After the player purchases items with a credit card (signified by a cash register sound), the player will pay the banker the appropriate amount of cash. Players can then mark that item off on their shopping list. Once a player buys an item from a particular store, they cannot return to that store. Once a player collects six of the items on their list, they must be the first to reach their respective parking lot (1989, 1996, and 2020 editions) or final destination (which may change at any time; 2004 and "Littlest Pet Shop" editions). The first person to accomplish this wins the game.

The 2020 version features a three-dimensional board representing a mall and featuring two stories, a bank, and a speaker located in the center of the board. The stores located on the second floor are only accessible by stairs or elevator.

The original game featured two types of currency to accomplish the game's objective: paper cash and credit cards. Four credit cards were included, one for each player. The names of the credit cards are Fast Cash (from Good Cents Bank), Quick Draw (from Dollar Daze Bank), MEGAmoney (from Big Bucks Bank), and Easy Money (from Cash n' Carry Bank). In the 2004 edition, these cards were referred to as "cash cards".

== Marketing ==
The game has been designed for players ages 9+. Milton Bradley produced several commercials for the game that appear to target a younger female demographic.

Two special-edition Hannah Montana and Littlest Pet Shop versions of the board game were released in 2008.

== Game contents ==
Mall Madness included the following pieces:

- a box
- a game board
- an electronic computer
- an instruction manual
- six plastic wall pieces
- four rubber pads to prevent wall pieces from slipping
- four cardboard shopping lists
- two sale signs
- one clearance sign
- eight plastic pawns (two for each color; red, blue, yellow and green, one was female the other male)
- forty plastic pegs (used to mark shopping lists)
- paper money (that resembles U.S. currency, except each bill denomination is color-coded for the game)
- four cardboard credit cards
- 29 pieces of cardboard which held the game board together

== Electronic computer ==
Original versions of the game featured an electronic computer to dictate gameplay. All computers in the early version of the game were manufactured in the United States. Milton Bradley copyrighted the computer in 1989. The top of the computer featured three buttons; one to start or reset gameplay, one to begin and end turns, and one to repeat the last announcement. Two slots on the computer's top were designed for the credit cards that accompanied the game. One slot was to buy items, the other was to use the banking feature.

== Stores ==
Mall Madness featured eighteen stores:

- I.M. Coughin Drug Store
- Suits Me Fine Men's Shop
- 2 Left Feet Shoes
- Short Circuit Electronics
- Yuppy Puppies Pets
- Scratchy's Records
- Novel Idea Books
- Frump's Fashion Boutique
- The Write Stuff Card Shop
- Fork It Over Kitchen Store
- Hokus Focus Cameras
- Sweaty's Sports
- Made in the Shade Sunglasses
- Chip's Computers
- Ruby's Jewelry
- DingaLing Phones
- M.T Wallet's Department Store
- Tinker's Toys

Additional areas:

- Conehead's Ice Cream
- Restrooms
- Vidiots Arcade
- Aunt Chovie's Pizza

== Legacy ==
Milton Bradley released a line of digital electronic voice board games following Mall Madness. In 1990, Milton Bradley, under its Parker Brothers brand, released an updated version of the 1984 Mystery Mansion board game, adding an electronic voice device. In 1992, they released Omega Virus, a board game on a space station infected by an extraterrestrial computer virus. Unlike previous electronic voice games by Milton Bradley, Omega Virus was unique in that it was the only one that had a countdown timer that would end the game if not completed before time ran out. Michael Gray, the creator of Mall Madness, also designed Omega Virus and Dream Phone.

With the release of the 2020 edition, Julien McCluney, vice president of global brand strategy and marketing at Hasbro, told Bustle, “In the original Mall Madness – as well as the new edition – the game is centered around the exciting experience of going on a shopping spree with friends, the fact that so many adults reminisce about the original [game] more than 30 years after its initial release speaks volumes to its place in pop culture!”
