= Ants in the Pants =

Ants in the Pants may refer to:

- Ants in the Pants (game), a game designed by insect-theme game designer William H. Schaper
- Ants in the Pants (film), a 2000 German comedy film
