= Park and Shop =

Park and Shop may mean:

- Andronico's, once known as Park and Shop, a supermarket chain in the San Francisco Bay Area
- Park & Shop (Cleveland Park, Washington, D.C.), built in 1930, of the first two neighborhood shopping centers in the United States
- ParknShop, a supermarket chain in Hong Kong
- Park and Shop (game), a board game
