= 1970 in games =

This page lists board and card games, wargames, and miniatures games published in 1970.

== Games released or invented in 1970 ==
- Buckaroo!
- Game of the Generals
- Masterpiece
- Matchwitz
- PanzerBlitz
- Ploy
- Posse: Thirteen Against One

== Deaths ==
Date	Name	Age	Notability
June 2	Albert Lamorisse	48	Filmmaker who invented Risk
