= The Game of Cootie =

Children's dice rolling and collection game

- Original box cover and game components, 1949
- Designers: William H. Schaper
- Publishers: Hasbro
- Publication: 1949; 77 years ago
- Players: 2 to 4
- Setup time: 2–4 minutes
- Playing time: 10–20 minutes
- Chance: Entirely
- Age range: 3 and up
- Skills: Matching

The Game of Cootie is a children's game for two to four players. The object is to be the first to build a three-dimensional bug-like object called a cootie. The game was invented by William H. Schaper in 1948. In 2003, the Toy Industry Association included Cootie on its "Century of Toys List" of the 100 most memorable and most creative toys of the 20th century.

== History ==
The game was invented in 1948 by William H. Schaper, a manufacturer of small commercial popcorn machines in Robbinsdale, Minnesota. It was likely inspired by an earlier pencil-and-paper game where players drew cootie parts according to a dice roll and/or a 1939 game version of that using cardboard parts with a cootie board. Schaper's cootie, which was originally wooden and sold at the Schaper family's Robbinsdale Bakery, was commercialised in 1949 and moved to a plastic construction for wide distribution. Over 1.2 million game units were sold by 1952, and over 25 million by 1971.

In 1986, Hasbro acquired the game from Tyco Toys.

A "Cootie" statue was exhibited in Robbinsdale in 2018.

== Game play ==
The game is played with a die ("Cootie cube"), game board, and Cootie bug parts. The purpose of the game is to be the first to build a complete Cootie. To collect parts, players roll the Cootie Cube (die). Each number on the die has a corresponding Cootie bug part. Players must first collect the body with a 1 roll, then the head with a 2, and then the remaining parts in any order. Players reroll when collecting a part; their turn ends if they already have the rolled part.
