= Dark Tower (game) =

Board game

- Designers: Roger Burten; Alan Coleman; Vincent Erato
- Illustrators: Bob Pepper
- Publishers: Milton Bradley
- Publication: 1981; 45 years ago
- Players: 1–4
- Playing time: 90'
- Age range: 10+

Related games
- Dragonmaster; Return to Dark Tower

Dark Tower is a 1981 electronic board game, by Milton Bradley Company, for one to four players. The object of the game is to amass an army, collect the three keys to the Tower, and defeat the evil within. Advertising for the game included a television commercial featuring Orson Welles.

A sequel, Return to Dark Tower, was developed by Restoration Games and released in 2022.

== Components ==
The game includes:

- 1 electronic center unit (the eponymous Dark Tower, powered by two "D"-size (LR20) batteries)
- 1 circular cardboard game board, divided into four "kingdom" quadrants
  - 16 plastic buildings for the game board (bazaar, ruin, sanctuary, tomb)
  - Plastic structural pieces to hold the game board together
- 4 plastic warrior pawns
- 1 plastic dragon pawn
- 4 cardboard Pegasus tokens
- Additional game items, including
  - 12 plastic key pieces (gold, silver, brass)
  - 5 plastic flags (Arisilon, Brynthia, Durnin, Zenon, and the Dark Tower)
- 4 cardboard peg boards used to keep track of a player's number of troops, gold and food
  - 42 red plastic Battleship-type score pegs

=== Dark Tower ===
The Tower itself consists of a small membrane keyboard beneath a "display" (a piece of tinted plastic). Behind the display cover is a carousel containing a number of film cels, which, when backlit by one of three lights mounted underneath, display the appropriate picture on the display cover. The display cover also conceals a digital LED display for representing numbers up to 99. As the Tower rotates and illuminates the appropriate cels during gameplay, it also emits sounds for the events represented by each cel.

=== Game board and pieces ===
Dark Tower kingdoms
Name	Heraldry
Arisilon	Yellow lion on red field
Brynthia	Pale yellow griffin on blue field
Durnin	Double-headed falcon on yellow field
Zenon	White unicorn on green field
Dark Tower	Black dragon on deep red field

The artwork for the game, including the cels in the Tower, was drawn by Bob Pepper.

The circular game board is divided into four quadrants, each corresponding to one of the four kingdoms, with the Dark Tower in the center. Each kingdom quadrant is divided into spaces, four of which are labeled for a building; the innermost (closest to the center) space is labeled as the Dark Tower, and the outermost ring of spaces includes a space for the citadel for that kingdom, which is where the kingdom's flag is placed and where the player pawn starts.

The sixteen buildings are divided into four sets (distinguished by color) of four buildings each: ruin, bazaar, tomb, and sanctuary. The twelve keys are divided by color into four gold keys, four silver keys, and four brass keys. Each flag corresponds to one of the four kingdoms (Arisilon, Brynthia, Durnin, and Zenon) and the Dark Tower itself. During the initial assembly of the game, the buildings are placed into the labeled spaces on the board, and stickers are peeled off a sheet and placed on the keys and flags.

== Gameplay ==
Dark Tower keypad
Yes Buy	Repeat	No End
Haggle	Bazaar	Clear
Tomb Ruin	Move	Sanctuary Citadel
Dark; Tower	Frontier	Inventory

=== Starting items ===
To start, each player receives a cardboard score chart and ten pegs; six pegs are used to track the player's party, starting with 10 warriors, 30 gold, and 25 food rations. The remaining four pegs keep track of the extra items (scout, beast, healer, or sword) once acquired; keys are placed directly in the appropriate score chart slots as they are acquired. Each player selects a pawn and places it in the citadel of their "home" kingdom. There are four different levels selectable on the Tower, which changes the number of Brigands defending it. With L1 the computer selects 17 to 32 Brigands to defend the Tower, L2 selects 33 to 64, and L3 selects 17 to 64. L4 is a special single-player tutorial mode which has 16 Brigands in the Tower and skips directly to the end game, granting the player all three keys immediately.

=== Turns ===
The basic structure of each turn is:

1. The digital display shows a flashing number, indicating that player's turn. For example, a blinking "2" indicates it is Player 2's turn.
2. The player moves their token one space, or leaves it in the space from which they started.
3. Press the appropriate blue button on the Tower panel to indicate the type of space they currently occupy.
4. The Tower presents an event by audible signal, accompanied in many instances by rotating the internal carousel and illuminating the appropriate cel for a visual signal, along with a number on the digital display, if appropriate. The Tower then resolves the event.
5. The digital display shows a flashing negative number (e.g., "-2"), indicating that player should press the No / End button to end their turn.

Each player takes turns rotating the Tower to face them and then moving their chosen hero about the board anticlockwise, moving up to one space per turn, as a player may choose to remain in the same space during their turn. More than one player may occupy the same space simultaneously. The quarter of the board in front of a player is their kingdom. Each kingdom quadrant is separated by a "frontier" space; when moving into a new kingdom from the frontier, players may choose to move into any space adjacent to the frontier.

=== Events ===
After the player moves their token one space, they press a button on the Tower corresponding to the type of space (e.g., Sanctuary, Tomb, Bazaar, Frontier, free/unoccupied space and ultimately onto the Dark Tower space). Depending on the space the player entered (or remained upon), there are several possible events. The Tower resolves what happens to the player by showing the appropriate cel and reporting whatever occurs. For instance, if the Tower decides the player encountered Brigands, it will illuminate the Brigands cel and display the number of brigands encountered. The Tower resolves the battle by alternately counting off the remaining numbers of friendly troops and Brigands down to a win or loss. Once all events have resolved, the Tower is rotated to the next player and their turn begins.

Potential events and signals according to the type of space
Event Space button		Safe	Battle (Note: If the player runs from the battle, they automatically lose one warrior in addition to any warriors already lost during the battle.)	Harms	Treasure
Move (Note: These are the standard (blank) spaces without buildings. These also exclude Citadel and Frontier spaces.)	Possible	Yes	Yes	Yes	Maybe (when player wins battle)
Move	Sound	short beep	battle horn	Refer to harmful events table	beeping
Move	Cel	—N/a	Brigands Warriors (Note: In this event, the cel display will alternate illumination between Brigands and Warriors, with the digital display showing the appropriate number of each until one counter reaches zero.)	Refer to harmful events table	Refer to treasure table
Tomb Ruin	Possible	Yes (when empty)	Yes	No	Yes
Tomb Ruin	Sound	creaking door shuts	battle horn	—N/a	beeping
Tomb Ruin	Cel	—N/a	Brigands Warriors	—N/a	Instant award, refer to treasure table
Sanctuary Citadel	Possible	Yes	No	No	No
Sanctuary Citadel	Sound	high-pitched trill when need identified (Note: The sanctuary will award the following items: Bonus warriors, when the player has less than 5 warriors; Bonus gold, when the player has less than 8 gold; Bonus food, when the player has less than 6 food; When the player re-enters their home citadel, the number of warriors will be doubled if the player has between 5 and 24 warriors. Otherwise, the standard sanctuary logic and bonuses will be applied.)	—N/a	—N/a	—N/a
Sanctuary Citadel	Cel	—N/a	—N/a	—N/a	—N/a
Bazaar	Possible	Yes	No	No	No
Bazaar	Sound	snake-charmer's music	—N/a	—N/a	—N/a
Bazaar	Cel	Refer to Bazaar table	—N/a	—N/a	—N/a
Frontier	Possible	Yes	No	No	No
Frontier	Sound	triumphant (or sad) music	—N/a	—N/a	—N/a
Frontier	Cel	Key missing (Note: If the player attempts to leave a foreign kingdom by entering the frontier without having acquired the key in that kingdom, the Dark Tower will play a sad musical tune, the "Key missing" cell will be lit, and the player must return to the last space. Attempting to use the Pegasus to leave the kingdom without finding the key will result in a "key missing" and loss of the Pegasus token.)	—N/a	—N/a	—N/a

In addition to the common safe entry and battle events, there are several potential harmful events that could occur to a player entering one of the standard spaces (i.e., when pressing the "Move" button):

Potential harmful events
Harm	Sound	Cel	Description
Lost	sad music	Lost	The player has become lost; they lose a turn and move their token back to the space they last occupied.
Lost	sad music	Scout	However, when the player has a scout, the scout cel is illuminated instead and the player remains in the space.
Plague	death march	Plague	The player loses two warriors to the plague, unless they have a healer.
Plague	death march	Healer	If the player has a healer, the healer cel is illuminated and the player gains two warriors instead.
Dragon	high-pitched screech	Dragon	The player loses 1/4 of their gold and warriors to the attacking dragon, unless they possess the dragonsword. In that case, the player slays a dragon and is awarded the gold and warriors which that dragon has taken since the last dragon was slain. The dragonslayer then moves the dragon token to any standard space, which prevents all players from entering that space until the next dragon attack.
Cursed	negative music	Cursed	The player loses a turn, moving back to the last occupied space, and loses 1/4 of their gold and warriors to the player who used a wizard to curse them.

=== Battle rewards ===
When the player wins a battle, they may be awarded one or more treasures. Treasure(s) also can be awarded without battle when entering a ruin or tomb.

Potential treasures
Treasure	Sound	Cel	Description
Gold	beeping	Gold	The number displayed is the total number of bags of gold the player now has. However, the player may not carry more gold than 6× the number of warriors, unless the player owns a beast, which can carry 50 bags of gold by itself.
Key	beep	Brass Key Silver Key Gold Key	Keys are always awarded in the order brass, silver, and gold. Only one key can be found in each foreign kingdom, so each player must journey through all four quadrants of the board before attempting the Dark Tower.
Pegasus	lilting music	Pegasus	The Pegasus token can be used to fly to any space within the current kingdom, or from one kingdom to the next, and is surrendered upon use. When flying to another kingdom, the player must already have the key from the originating kingdom.
Dragonsword	beep	Sword	When the player possesses the dragonsword, they will slay the dragon if it attacks.
Wizard	beep	Wizard	The player chooses another player and applies a curse, taking 1/4 of the targeted player's gold and warriors.

=== Supplies from the Bazaar ===
In the Bazaar, players may purchase items, including warriors, consumable food, and durable bonuses. Warriors are needed for battle and to carry the player's gold, up to six gold per warrior. One food ration will feed up to 15 warriors per turn regardless of movement, so when the player has 16–30 warriors, for instance, they will consume two food rations per turn. If the player runs out of food, one warrior will die per turn from starvation.

Bazaar items and signals
Name / Cel	Description
Warrior	Digital display indicates the number of warrior(s) being purchased.
Food	Digital display indicates the number of food ration(s) being purchased. Food prices cannot be haggled.
Beast	One beast may be purchased per player per game. The beast carries 50 bags of gold.
Scout	One scout may be purchased per player per game. The scout prevents the player from being lost and is not surrendered if the player becomes lost.
Healer	One healer may be purchased per player per game. The healer prevents the player from losing warriors to plague and is not surrendered if the player's party becomes stricken with plague.
Bazaar Closed	Each press of the Haggle button gives approximately even chance (50/50) of lowering the price by one bag of gold. However, pressing the Haggle button repeatedly may result in the merchant becoming angry and refusing to sell any goods, indicated by a Bazaar Closed cel. The Bazaar will also close if the player attempts to buy more food (or more of anything else) than they can afford, even by accident.

=== Objective ===
Each kingdom besides a player's own contains one of three keys—bronze, silver and gold, acquired in that order—needed to unlock the Tower. The location of the key within a kingdom is randomly determined by the Tower. Each player therefore must travel around the board through each other kingdom until the player has all three keys; players are free to move through spaces in other kingdoms except for the foreign citadel. At this point, the player returns to their kingdom, buys reinforcements for a maximum complement of warriors, and then attempts to unlock the Tower by entering a code which requires them to confirm a sequence of keys (bronze, silver, and gold) displayed in the correct order, randomized for each game. Once cracked, this brings them to the final battle to defeat the Tower, which contains a predetermined number of defenders inside, depending on the level selected at the start of the game. The first player to beat the Tower wins the game; losing the battle requires building up another army.

== Development and litigation ==
Milton Bradley launched the game in September 1981 at the Magic Castle in Los Angeles. As part of the publicity campaign, Milton Bradley stated the development of Dark Tower started in January 1979 and cost the company more than US$750,000 (equivalent to $2,660,000 in 2025); the name was finalized in November 1980 after preliminary names including Venture and Hostage were discarded. Vince Erato, who previously created the Big Trak toy (1979), was credited with designing the game, inspired by the computer game Wilderness Campaign (1979). According to InfoWorld, the game uses a TMS-1400 microcontroller with 2 K of memory.

George Ditomassi, the M-B vice president of sales, said it was aimed at "people who had heard about D and D but who didn't want to be Dungeons and Dragons freaks." Shortly after launch, although the game's retail price was between US$55 and US$65 (equivalent to $230 in 2025), Ditomassi noted "it shouldn't be selling yet because it's too high-priced and there hasn't been any advertising", but added that nevertheless, each Toys "R" Us store was selling an average of one and a half units per week.

Marketing for the game included a television commercial featuring Orson Welles. Despite favorable reviews and reportedly strong sales, production of the game stopped after a single holiday season, and it was targeted by a lawsuit.

Independent inventors Robert Burten and Allen Coleman had previously met with M-B in February 1980 to demonstrate their prototype game developed in late 1979 named Triumph, a space adventure game with a round board and a central microprocessor-controlled game unit. Before they were allowed to show the game to M-B, Burten and Coleman were required to sign a waiver of non-disclosure. Erato was present for the demonstration. Afterward, M-B retained the game for a few weeks for further evaluation, then returned it to the inventors, stating it was not interested in licensing their design. Internally, M-B used a three-tiered review structure, with only 5% of game ideas receiving the scrutiny of top-level executives during a "Presidential Review"; according to internal records, Triumph received a Presidential Review on March 20, 1980. At Toy Fair New York in January 1981, Burten and Coleman saw M-B exhibiting Dark Tower and noted the similarities between the commercial game and their prototype, despite the changed theme: both games used a round board with raised elements and a rotating, computerized tower that provided visual and sound signals.

Burten and Coleman filed a lawsuit for misappropriation of trade secrets. Following a trial, a jury awarded them US$737,058.10 (equivalent to $2,206,000 in 2025) in April 1984, their estimated share of the royalties they lost based on $22 million in sales. Erato, called as a witness, was said to have cost M-B the case, as he was reported to be "kind of cranky and [...] annoyed that they alleged that he stole the idea." According to Erato, he independently conceived the central tower around Christmas 1979, two months before Burten and Coleman met with M-B, but his combative attitude at trial hindered the believability of his testimony and because he did not keep good records, he could not prove this assertion. Michael Gray, a M-B designer who contributed to the Dark Tower manual, disputed the commercial game had copied Triumph, noting the motorized cel carousel was unique to Dark Tower.

Trial judge Bruce M. Selya, however, vacated the jury's verdict in August 1984. Despite finding that Milton Bradley had likely "plagiarized the plaintiffs' idea without so much as a by-your-leave", Judge Selya proceeded to issue a directed verdict for the defendant because Burton and Coleman had signed a contract waiving any contractual relationship (which arguably included any duty of confidentiality). The First Circuit Court of Appeals reversed in May 1985, finding evidence that Milton Bradley entered an implied agreement to keep the game confidential and reinstated the damage award.

== Reception ==
Games magazine included Dark Tower in their "Top 100 Games of 1981", noting especially how the "tower itself swivels so that each player alone views what happens to his own band of warriors".

In a retrospective review of Dark Tower in Black Gate, Scott Taylor said "as I remembered Dark Tower, and its card game predecessor Dragonmaster, I couldn't help but get incredibly nostalgic. There was something truly unique about those games, something almost spiritual, and I can credit this most certainly with the artist who brought them to us, Bob Pepper."

=== Reviews ===
- Family Games: The 100 Best

=== Legacy ===
Several web-based versions of the game have been developed over the years; an app called Droid Tower developed by Muse of Water was available for Android; and a similar app by MacCrafters is available for iOS.

=== Sequel ===
Return to Dark Tower was launched on Kickstarter on January 14, 2020, by Restoration Games as a cooperative game for 1–4 players. Designed by Isaac Childres and Rob Daviau, the creators of Gloomhaven and Pandemic Legacy respectively, the game features a motorized rotating tower guided by an app.

== See also ==
- Enchanted Palace (1994–1995)
