= Pirate and Traveler =

Board game

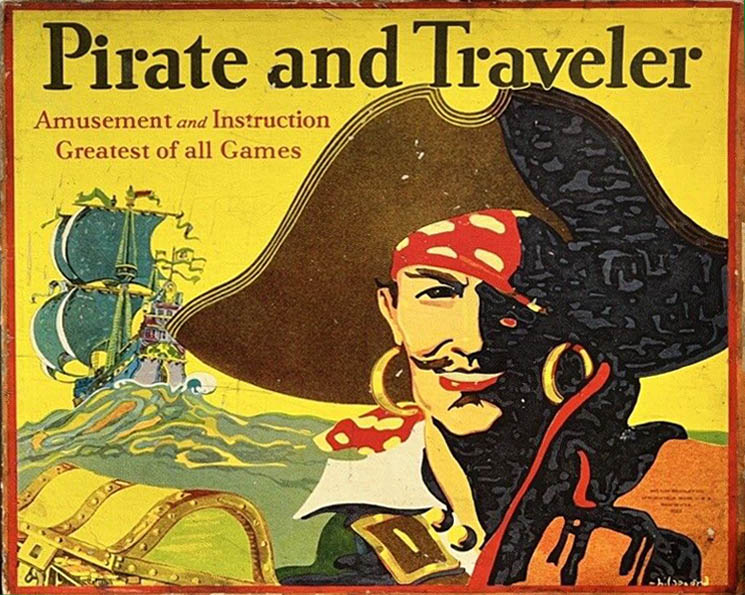
- 1911 edition cover
- Publishers: Milton Bradley
- Publication: 1911; 115 years ago
- Players: 2-4
- Age range: 7+

Pirate and Traveler is a board game published by Milton Bradley in 1911. Revised editions were published in 1936, 1953, 1956, 1960, and 1970. Details of the game board, travel cards, spinner, pawns and box art varied between edition years. The game is no longer in production and is now considered a vintage collectible board game.

== Overview ==
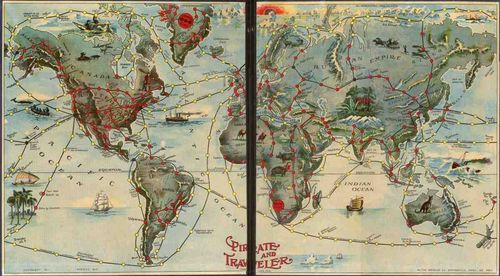
1911 board game

The manufacturer's suggested number of players is 2 to 4, and is suggested for ages 7 and up. Playing time average is 60 minutes. Within a general descriptive category of board games, Pirate and Traveler is a "geography, pirate, adventure" game. Besides being a good way for young people to learn basic world geography, the game also includes a more cutthroat head-to-head piracy strategy phase to add to the excitement.

Game play involves drawing a secret travel card which dictates the journeys that are to be made by the travelers. The distance to be traveled in each move is determined by spinning a numbered wheel. This spinner is a uniquely patented Milton Bradley device and rewards players with numbers ranging from 2 to 30. Players moves their colored game pieces, termed "travelers", the corresponding number of spaces on the game board until reaching their destination. The routes of travel were based on well-known railroad and steamship lines, and major cities and ports throughout the world. The travel cards not only list the destination continent, country, and city, but also include goods to be collected in that city. Goods range from cotton to uranium, and a point value ranging from 10 to 100 points is listed on each card. The game map includes dangers such as "Shipwrecked" or "Eaten by Wolves" that can delay the travelers along their way.

After one of the travelers has successfully reached 10 destinations, that player declares or shouts, "Pirates All"! At this point all players take on the role of pirates and try to deposit the goods they have collected as travelers safely in the Pirates Goal (in Greenland). The players can also try to waylay other travelers in this phase of the game, and rob them of their own collected goods. When one player has safely made it to the Pirates Goal two times, the game is ended, and the player with the highest point total of goods safely deposited in Greenland is declared the winner.
