= Torpedo Run! =

1986 board game

- The Torpedo Run! game box
- Publishers: Milton Bradley
- Players: 1-4
- Setup time: 10 minutes
- Playing time: 60 minutes
- Age range: 8 and up

Torpedo Run! is a 1986 board game published by Milton Bradley. It was released as a part of the "Floor Wars" series of games.

== Gameplay ==
Torpedo Run! plays on a 34½ × 46½ inch game board, intended for use on the floor. Game pieces include 2 battleships, 6 cruisers, and 2 submarine shooters. A total of 36 plastic ammunition chips can be loaded into ship pieces to be fired during the game.

=== Objective ===
Torpedo Run! has three main styles of play. The first is "All-Out-War," in which players fire a supply of 18 ammo chips at their opponent's battleships, aiming to hit the targets on each one. Ships may be reloaded with ammo as the game progresses. The player who successfully knocks out the other's ships first wins the game. In the "Out-Of-Range" game, each player is equipped with 14 ammo chips. Similarly to the All-Out-War Game, players fire at each other's ships in succession, however, rather than reloading when ammo depletes, after both players run out of chips, a ceasefire begins. In the ceasefire, ships are assessed for "damage," which decides whether or not pieces may be moved. The game continues until all ships have been eliminated. The third variety of gameplay is the solo "Target Practice" game. The object of this game is simply to knock as many targets as possible using all 36 chips.

== See also ==
- List of Milton Bradley Company Products
