= Stuff Yer Face =

Board game

Stuff Yer Face is a discontinued tabletop game created in 1982 by Milton Bradley. The game consists of a blue circular playing field with two clown puppets (one with yellow sleeves, one with green sleeves). The playing field has 25 marbles; ten yellow, ten green, five red. The object of the game is to first "eat" (by using the handles at the back of the clown puppet's arms to grab the marble using the clown's hands and putting it in its mouth) all ten of the marbles that match the color of that player's clown sleeves (thus the clown with green sleeves eats the green marbles and the yellow marbles are eaten by the yellow-sleeved clown). If a player eats an opposing player's marble (for example if the green sleeved clown eats a yellow marble), it counts the same as if the opposing player ate it.

Once the player has "eaten" all ten of their color marbles, they may now go for the red marbles. The first player to eat three (out of five) wins the game. If a player eats a red marble without first eating their ten yellow/green marbles, the opposing player automatically wins.
