= Hotel (board game) =

Board game

- Other names: Hotels
- Designers: Denys Fisher
- Publishers: Milton Bradley
- Publication: 1986; 39 years ago
- Years active: 1986–?
- Genres: Board game
- Languages: English
- Players: 2–4
- Playing time: 120'
- Age range: 8+

Related games
- Square Mile; Prize Property

Hotel (known as Hotels in North America) is a dimensional real estate game created by Milton Bradley in 1986. It is similar to Square Mile and Prize Property. In Hotel the players build resort hotels and attempt to drive their competitors into bankruptcy. It was re-released by Asmodee in 2014 as Hotel Tycoon (or Hotel Deluxe in some countries). In 2024 it was re-released by Ooba in a retro version called Hotel for the 50th anniversary.

== Gameplay ==
Players take turns moving around the board. Each square on the board is adjacent to one or two hotel properties. Most of the squares are either purchase squares or building squares.

Whenever a player lands on a purchase square which is adjacent to an unowned property they may buy that property by paying the purchase price. Once they own a property they may attempt to build on it whenever they land on a building square. A special die is rolled to determine if permission to build is granted or denied. If it is denied the player must wait for a later turn.

When permission is granted to build the player may add new buildings or facilities to their property. Each hotel has from one to five buildings and a set of recreational facilities. The main building must be built first, followed by the other buildings then the facilities. The cost of each addition is listed on the deed card for the property.

Once a player has at least one building on a property they may add entrances to their hotels. One entrance can be placed on each square of the board. If a player lands on an entrance for a hotel belonging to another player they must pay the owner to stay at that hotel. The cost of staying depends on the number of buildings and facilities in the property.

If the player cannot afford to stay at the hotel they must put their own properties up for auction to raise money. A player who loses all of their money and properties is out of the game. The last player remaining is the winner.

Hotel shares many gameplay concepts with Monopoly, including the buying of property with a deed, improvement of the property and collecting a fee for landing on that property. Players also collect $2000/£2000 each time they round the board, akin to Monopoly's $200 for passing Go.

== Reception ==
On BoardGameGeek, it has an average rating of 5.5/10 based on roughly 5000 reviews.

In the February 1988 issue of The Games Machine (Issue 3), the reviewer said that "Hotel, although aimed at eight-years-old and up, can become involved and time consuming. It proves immense fun to play, and the board and accessories are such an attractive sight it is quite a disappointment when the whole thing gets packed up in its box again. Concentration is a must although actual brainpower is not over-used. A worthwhile game to play with friends and a good supply of food 'n 'drink."

== Reviews ==
- Jeux & Stratégie #48
