= Bob Pepper (illustrator) =

American illustrator (1938–2019)

Bob Pepper (October 23, 1938—January 16, 2019) was an American illustrator whose work included record and paperback covers, greeting cards, magazine illustrations and game artwork, between the 1960s and 1980s.

== Life and work ==
Pepper was born in 1938 in Portsmouth, NH to Peggy and Rueben Pepper. He attended the Art Center College of Design in Pasadena, California, studying illustration and advertising. It was here he met his future wife, Brenda Soderquist. The couple moved to New York in the early 1960s, where Pepper established himself as a commercial artist.

From the mid-1960s to the early 1970s Pepper created sleeve art for fifty-odd RCA and Elektra Records releases, including the latter's Nonesuch and Checkmate labels. Perhaps his most enduring work is the cover of Love's 1967 Forever Changes album (though this was altered by the designer, Bill Harvey, who added the foremost face's smile).

Pepper also produced paperback cover artwork, including for the Ballantine Adult Fantasy series (his covers including A Voyage to Arcturus by David Lindsay, and books by Lord Dunsany, James Branch Cabell, Joy Chant, Evangeline Walton and Mervyn Peake's Gormenghast trilogy), and a series of Philip K. Dick covers for DAW Books in the 1980s.

In 1981, he created the artwork for the Milton Bradley card game Dragonmaster, and their electronic board game, Dark Tower.

== Style ==
Pepper's cited influences include Renaissance art, Art Nouveau, Art Deco, and psychedelic art, as well as the work of specific illustrators such as James Hill (for his Pocket Books covers) and Roger Dean (for his Yes album covers).

When working, he would normally produce artwork at twice the intended reproduction size, using gouache and dyes on charcoal paper, sometimes drawing on acetate.
