= Power Barons =

Board game

Power Barons is a board game for 3 to 4 players released in 1986 by Milton Bradley.

== Gameplay ==
The object of the game is for a player to build power bases in opponents' territories.

== Reception ==
Marc Gascoigne reviewed Power Barons for White Dwarf #90, and stated that "All in all I found the game initially attractive – because of the out-and-out grossness of the components, and in play rather disappointing. Expecting something like Dallas didn't prepare me for what was an abstract and rather simplistic game which didn't deserve quite such a lavish production job. I guess they just make everything bigger in the USA."

== Reviews ==
- 1986 Games 100
