= Ea$y Money =

Board game

Ea$y Money is a board game published in 1988 by Milton Bradley.

== Contents ==
Ea$y Money is a game in which the winner is the richest player when all the money in the bank is gone.

== Reception ==
Alan Kennedy reviewed Easy Money for Games International magazine, and gave it 1 star out of 5 (a turkey), and stated that "The verdict on Easy Money? If you like a game with a bit of challenge, forget it. Money was never this easy."
