= Matchwitz =

- Publishers: Milton Bradley
- Publication: 1974; 52 years ago
- Players: 2
- Playing time: 2 minutes
- Age range: 12+

Matchwitz is a 1970 Milton Bradley Company version of the classic nim game, presented in a green tray. The game is for players age eight to adult.

== Gameplay ==
First ensure that all pins are exposed on one side of the board. Pins are in 3 rows. Top row has 7 pins, middle row has 5 pins, and the bottom row has 3 pins. Players alternate taking turns. In each turn a player may push down any number of pegs in a single row (they can't play in more than one row at a time). The player forced to push down the last remaining peg loses the game.
