= Enchanted Palace =

Children's Board Game

- Manufacturers: Milton Bradley Company
- Publication: 1994; 31 years ago
- Years active: 1994-1995
- Languages: English
- Players: 1-4
- Playing time: 20 minutes
- Age range: 6+

Enchanted Palace is a children's board game released in 1994 by the Milton Bradley Company. The goal is for players to make their way through the castle to rescue the queen from an evil witch.

== Basic rules ==
Enchanted Palace comes with the following pieces:

- The Board
- The Castle (the castle must be built)
- A Witch & Queen Pawn (Cardboard Standie of the Witch, an image of the queen placed in the tower)
- 4 Transparent Glitterized Player Pawns: Pink, Blue, Purple, and Yellow/Orange
- 4 Frog Standies Player Pawns (cardboard standies of frogs with bows matching the colors of the Player Pawns - for enchanted players)
- 4 Transparent Glitterized Crowns (The Colors Of The Player Pawns)
- 4 of each: Lantern, Mirror, Key (Cardboard pieces with images of these items, which the players must collect)
- 1 Magic Wand (batteries not included)

Once the castle has been "built", the queen will ask, "Who will help me?" and call out the names of each of the Princesses (the player pieces). As each name is called, the player presses the magic wand on a button on the speaker to 'sign in'.

=== Multiplayer ===
The witch then addresses the player characters, stating, "I have your queen, you will never save her!" The queen then instructs the first player to enter a room. The player's Princess pawn is then moved into a room, and the wand is inserted into one of the holes on the board to select the room, then into the crown on the game console to search the room. The princess will then be told she found one of the three items, or that "There is nothing for you here!"

If all four pawns are in play, the Pink is first to move, followed by the Blue, then Purple, and finally the Yellow/Orange.

The witch will randomly select a room to cast a spell upon, if a Princess is in the enchanted room, she will be changed into a frog, and the player must replace the glittery Princess pawn with a frog pawn and pass the wand to the next player. The next player is given the choice to enter the next room or to cast a spell. If the player casts a spell, they will be told the enchanted player has been saved, the enchanted player can then resume with the original Princess pawn, but must repay the rescuing player with one of the items they previously recovered.

Once a player has all three items, the queen calls that player to the tower, the pawn is moved to the tower and the player passes the wand on to the next player, until the next turn. Once all players have had a final turn, the queen will call out to the Princess standing on the tower to "Help me!" The player presses the button on top of the tower, and the doors swing open, freeing the queen, and knocking the witch off the tower. The queen then addresses the winning player and states, "You saved me. You are the princess of the kingdom!" Then you take the bow off your pawn's head, and replace it with her corresponding crown.

=== Single player ===
If playing Solo, the player signs in as Rose, the Pink Princess and plays as far as possible. If Rose is "cursed" and turned into a frog, then the Blue Princess will come in, this can continue until the player has won, or until all four Princesses have been turned into a Frog.

=== Game over ===
In multi-player mode, it is game over if all four Princess pawns are in the same room and turned into Frogs when the witch casts her spell. In Single Player mode, if all four princesses are turned into Frogs, then it is game over, and the witch has won.

== Characters ==
Including the NPCs, there are a total of six characters. These are:

- The Witch (NPC-A Standie placed at the top of the tower) - The Antagonist
- The Queen (NPC-An image hidden behind closed doors at the top of the tower) - The Character the Players are trying to rescue
- Princess Rose (Player Character) - The Pink Princess Pawn, and first player character called to move
- Princess Sky (Player Character) - The Blue Princess Pawn, and second player character called to move
- Princess Violet (Player Character) - The Purple Princess Pawn, and third player character called to move
- Princess Amber (Player Character) - The "Yellow" Princess Pawn, and fourth and final player character called to move.

Note: While Princess Amber is referred to as the Yellow Princess, she is more orange in color.

== Story ==
Once upon a time in a land far away, an Evil Witch captured a magical palace and locked its Good Queen in the tower! Can you and your friends help her escape? If you do, you can become Princess of the Kingdom!

Use the enchanted wand to search each palace room for a magic lantern, mirror, and key. When the wand lights up, you will hear different sounds from each of the 7 rooms - birds singing in the garden, music from the music room, and even moans from the dungeon! Then listen closely and the Good Queen will tell you what to do.

Beware the Evil Witch - she will turn anyone into a frog! Use the wand to undo her spells and save your friends! To win: collect all 3 magic objects, free the Good Queen, banish the Evil Witch, and become the Princess of the Kingdom!

Features a 3D board and mechanical as well as electronic parts.

== Categories and info ==
=== Categories ===
- Children's Game
- Electronic
- Fantasy
- Memory

=== Players ===
- 1-4 Players
- Ages: 6+

=== Publishers and play time ===
- Published by Milton Bradley Company in 1994
- Expected Game Play: 20 minutes

== See also ==
- Dark Tower (1981)
