= Voice of the Mummy =

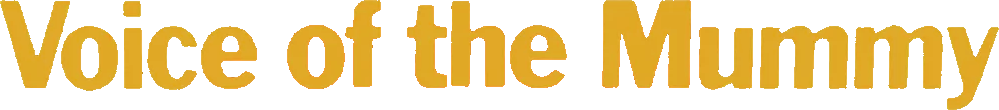
- Publishers: Milton Bradley
- Publication: 1971; 54 years ago
- Years active: 1971–?
- Genres: Board game
- Languages: English
- Players: 2–4
- Playing time: 30'
- Age range: 7+

Voice of the Mummy is a three-dimensional board game produced by Milton Bradley in 1971. It used an actual record player to instruct the players during the game.

== Method of play ==
According to the description inside the game's boxtop, the game takes place in an ancient pharaoh's tomb, which has a three-level pathway scattered with jewels. Using a single die, and directed by a voice - presumably that of the pharaoh's mummy - the players (called "Explorers" in the instructions) travel up and around the steps surrounding a sarcophagus collecting jewels, in an attempt to be the first to arrive at the mummy that lies inside the sarcophagus to receive the "great jewel," that also comes with the evil cobra "spell."

The game uses sound to direct players and control the strategy of play. The sound is produced by a record player concealed inside the mummy's sarcophagus on the playing board. When an Explorer lands on certain areas of the board, they must move a lever which starts the record. The ominous voice speaks out one of 40 recorded messages, telling the Explorer what they must do, e.g., "Avoid the paralyzing touch of the slimy snails of Arro. Return at once to your temple," or "Listen to the lost souls whispering in eternal darkness. Take one jewel," etc. In the television commercial which promoted the game, the message was, "Look out--the unholy snakes of Amon reach from below! Move up one level." Some messages may help the player, whereas others may be harmful to the progress of the Explorer. Players have no way of knowing which message they will hear.

Once an Explorer acquires the "great jewel" and the "cobra's spell," the record is then turned over. Still controlled by the mummy's voice, Explorers, in a scramble to avoid the Explorer that is attempting to get rid of the spell, try to get out of the pharaoh's tomb with the highest value of jewels to win the game.
