= Century: Spice Road =

Tabletop strategy game

- Century: Spice Road box cover
- Players: 2-5
- Playing time: 30-45 minutes
- Skills: Strategy

Century: Spice Road is a 2017 table-top strategy game designed by Emerson Matsuuchi and distributed by Plan B Games. The game is a simulation of fifteenth-century spice trading, and each player competes for points as they buy and sell spices represented by colored cubes.

== Gameplay ==
Each turn, a player will play a card, buy a card, or take back into their hand cards they had previously discarded. By doing so, the player builds a hand of cards that enable the player to collect or upgrade spices to fill orders that score points for the player.

== Reception ==
The game has received positive reviews. The Guardian calls Century: Spice Road "slick and fast-paced," noting also that the game's "speed and simplicity mask some real depth." Owen Duffy of Ars Technica calls it a "tight, brain-teasing card game." The New Indian Express describes the game as "clever," also praising the game's pace, a facet encouraged by the focus on series of small, quick decisions as opposed to offering many options to consider simultaneously. The game currently holds a rating of 7.4 on the website BoardGameGeek.

Another review at Ars Technica states that it is "slightly more complex" than Splendor, and that it is "an absolute joy to play".

== Expansions ==
Two official Century: Spice Road mini-expansions have been published as Bonus Cards Sets with unique mechanisms to introduce new strategies. In addition, Plan B Games released a re-themed version of the game titled Century: Golem Edition. In this new version, players trade crystals and compete to build golems, and it features new art and a new setting, in a fantasy world called Caravania.
