= Don't Break the Ice =

Board game

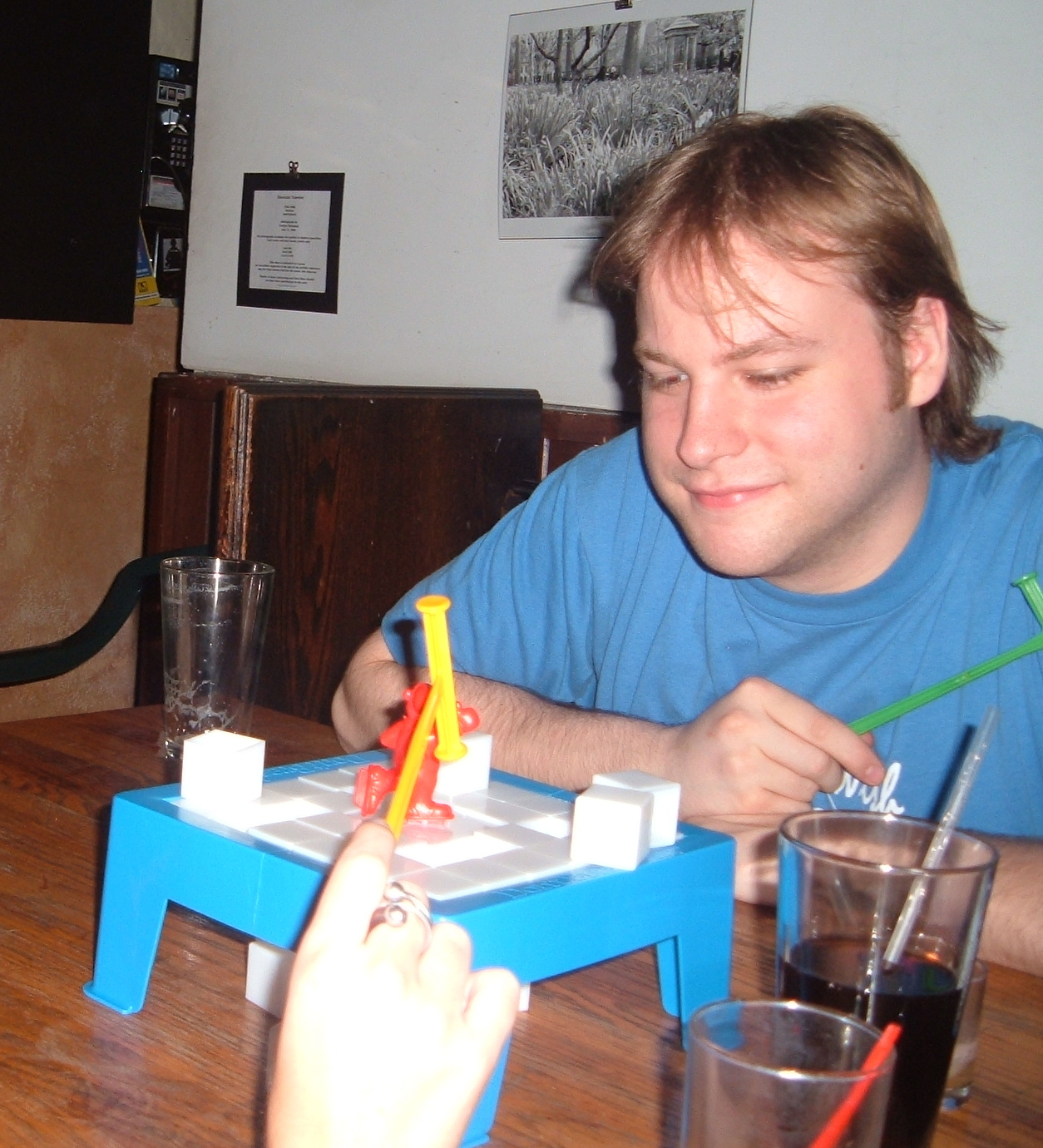
- Publishers: Hasbro
- Years active: 1968-present
- Setup time: < 5 minutes
- Playing time: 3-8 minutes
- Chance: None
- Skills: Strategy, Manual dexterity

Don't Break the Ice is a children's tabletop game for two to four players ages 3 and up. First marketed by Schaper Toys in 1968, the game was sold to Hasbro subsidiary Milton Bradley in 1986. It is still in production, and special editions were released in conjunction with the films Frozen (2013) and Frozen II (2019).

== Game play ==
The game is played with a set of plastic "ice blocks", a stand, and one miniature plastic hammer for each player. One ice block is larger than the rest, and has a plastic character standing on it - this varies from edition to edition, being either Phillip the Penguin, a man referred to as "Ice Man", or a polar bear.

To set up the game, the stand is turned upside down and the ice blocks placed into the frame, so that the shared uniform compression of the blocks pressed against each other will cause them to stay in place when the stand is turned upright. The players then take turns removing ice blocks by tapping with the hammers. The game ends when one player causes the block with the character figure to fall through. The player who took the turn before that one wins the game.
