= Go to the Head of the Class =

Board game

- Other names: Go to the Head of the Class; El primero de la clase
- Publishers: Chad Valley; Milton Bradley
- Publication: 1936; 90 years ago
- Years active: 1936–2013
- Genres: Board game
- Languages: English
- Players: 2–6
- Playing time: 45'
- Age range: 6+

Go to the Head of the Class is a roll-and-move board game published originally by the Chad Valley Co Ltd. in 1936. It was then published by Milton Bradley (now owned by Hasbro). Go to the Head of the Class was last produced by Winning Moves USA in 2013.

The game board is designed to look like a top view of a school classroom with the teacher's blackboard at one end. Original tokens were cardboard images of adult and children affixed to wooden or plastic bases. Players can advance to the "head of the class" by moving tokens from desk to desk as a result of answering questions correctly. The game also includes random "chance cards" that add or subtract positions without involving a question, such as "Put away that peashooter and go back 3 desks" or "For good penmanship, advance two desks".
