= Schaper Toys =

Manufacturer of toys and games

- Industry: Toy manufacturer
- Founded: 1949
- Founder: William Herbert Schaper
- Fate: Sold to Kusan, Inc. in 1971. Schaper Division acquired by Tyco Toys in 1986.
- Headquarters: Robbinsdale, Minnesota, United States
- Products: Cootie; Ants in the Pants; Don't Break the Ice; Don't Spill the Beans

Original Cootie box cover, 1949

Schaper Toys, or W.H. Schaper Mfg. Co., Inc. as it was originally known, was a game and toy company founded in 1949 by William Herbert Schaper in Robbinsdale, Minnesota. "Herb" Schaper published a variety of games but was best known for having created the children's game, Cootie. In 1971, the company was sold to Kusan, Inc., and began operating as Schaper Toys, a subsidiary of Kusan, Inc. In 1986, Schaper Toys was acquired by Tyco Toys, which sold the rights to Cootie and three other of the company's best-known games to the Milton Bradley Company. These games are still being sold.

== History ==
William Herbert "Herb" Schaper (1914—1980) was a Minnesota postman who created, developed, and manufactured a children's game known as Cootie. After whittling a fishing lure in 1948, he molded the object in plastic, fashioned a game around it, and formed the H. W. Schaper Mfg. Co., Inc. to manufacture and publish the game. In the fall of 1949, the game was launched on the market, and sold through Dayton's department stores. Schaper sold 5,000 Cootie games by 1950, and over 1.2 million games by 1952. In 2003 'Cootie' was named one of the top 100 most memorable and creative toys in the last century by the Toy Industry Association.

Schaper Toys manufactured a host of other games including the well-known Ants in the Pants and Don't Break the Ice. While most children's games of the period were made of paper and cardboard, Schaper Toys was one of the first toy and game manufacturers to extensively use plastic in its products. Schaper games were constructed almost completely of plastic.

The company introduced Stompers, a battery-powered line of toy trucks and other vehicles in the 1980s. Along with Cootie, the toys were included in the Toy Industry Association's "Century of Toys List".

In the early 1980s, Schaper became one of the licensed producers of Playmobil in the United States. A large deal with McDonald's to promote Playmobil by distributing figures in Happy Meals ended badly when the toys were found to violate American child safety regulations. According to the Consumer Product Safety Commission (CPSC) the Playmobil toys had removable parts which were choking hazards to children under three years old.

Schaper Manufacturing operated as the Schaper Toy division of Kusan Inc. in the 1970s and 1980s. In 1986, Schaper Toys was acquired by Tyco Toys, which is now a division of Mattel Inc. In the deal, Tyco sold the rights to four Schaper games including Cootie to Hasbro's Milton Bradley division. In 1987 the Schaper plant closed in Plymouth, MN. Cootie, Ants in the Pants, Don't Spill the Beans, and Don't Break the Ice are still manufactured and sold by the Milton Bradley company.

== Games ==
Schaper Christmas ad, ca. 1952

=== Super Jock line ===
In the mid-1970s Schaper introduced the Super Jock line. This line of toys included baseball, hockey, basketball, and soccer. The concept was similar to the football kicker - smash down on the head of the sports star and this would activate in sports motion.

=== Super Toe ===
Super Toe Super Jock Football (1970s) was a hard plastic field goal kicker. The game included Super Toe, field goal posts, and a plastic football. The object was simple, in a downward motion, smash the kicker on the helmet, this would activate the kicking leg and try to get a field goal from varying distances.

=== Big Mouth ===
Big Mouth (1968) is a game for 2 to 4 players. Each player is given a giant fork, a green insect, and several plastic food items. The players take turns using a spinner. The goal is to be the first player to feed all the food on their plate to the cardboard clown.

=== Clean Sweep ===
Clean Sweep (1967) is a game for 2, 3, or 4 players. The object is to "collect as much 'good' litter (scattered trash) as possible and at the same time avoid collecting any of the 'bad' litter."

=== Don't Blow Your Top ===
Don't Blow your Top (1972).

=== King of the Hill ===
"King of the Hill" (1963) is a game for two to four players who attempt to be the first to climb a mountain.

=== Puzzling Pyramid ===
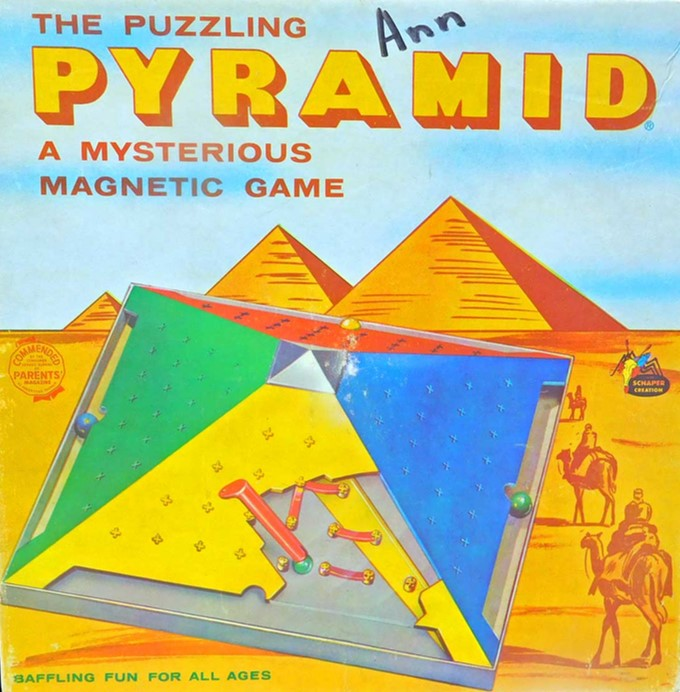
Box cover art for the game Puzzling Pyramid

Puzzling Pyramid (1960) is a game for 2, 3 or 4 players of all ages. The object of the game is for each player to use a magnetic exploring wand to guide a steel ball up one of the four colored (yellow, red, green, blue) sides of a pyramid into a common treasure vault at the top. On the inside of each side of the pyramid, plastic tunnel blocks are placed by an opposing player before the start of the game, which are designed to impede the wand user's progress to the top, however at least one open path must be provided.

=== Animax ===
Schaper released a line of action figures and vehicles in 1986 called Animax, versus their main enemy X-Tinctor.

=== Black Hole In Space ===
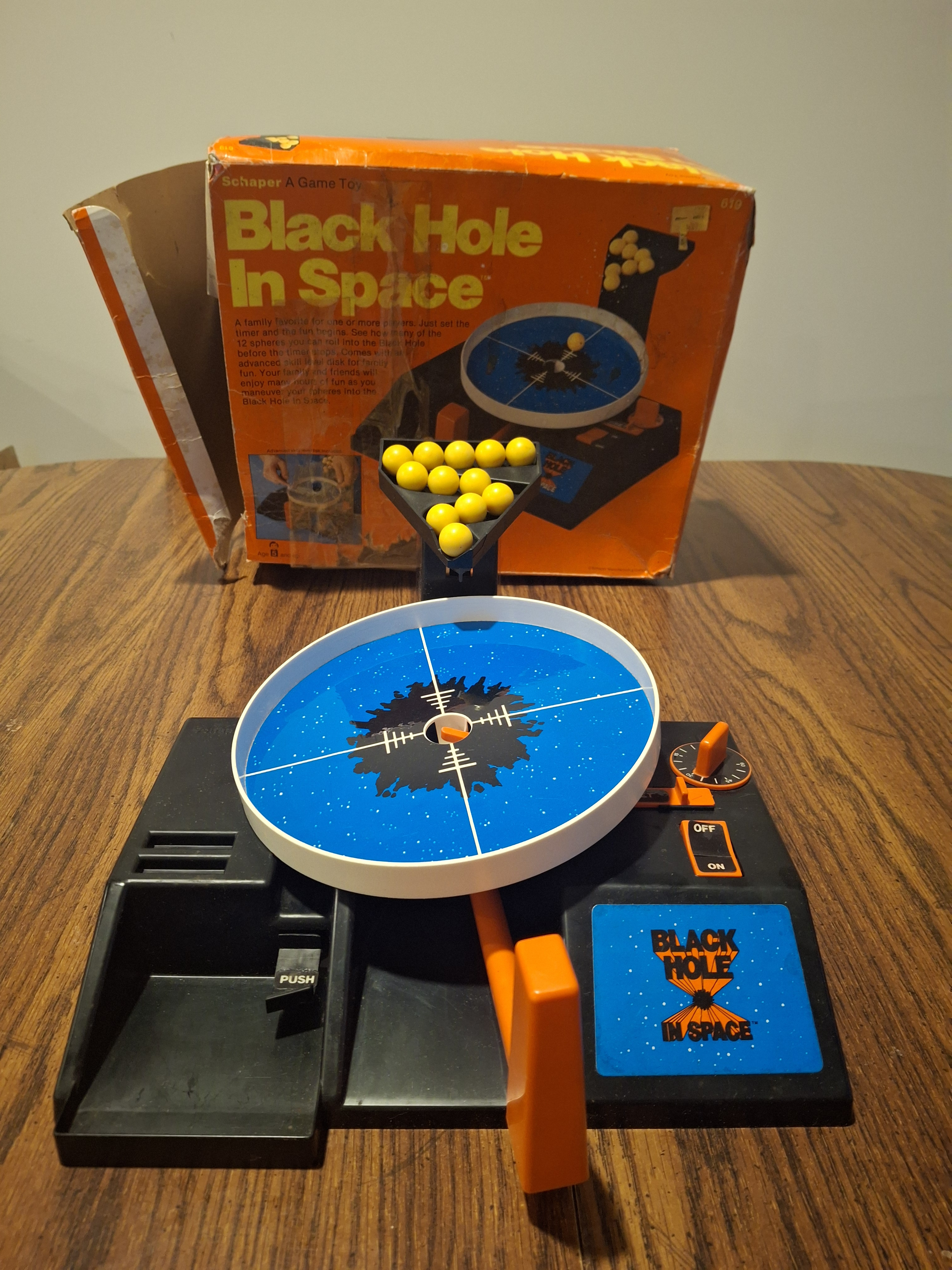
Box cover art for the game Black Hole In Space

"Black Hole In Space" (1979) is a Table Top game for one player who must attempt to see how many spheres (marbles) they can roll into the Black Hole before the timer stops. "Black Hole In Space" was originally designed to be a tie-in to the Walt Disney movie The Black Hole (1979 film).

=== Oh Chute! ===
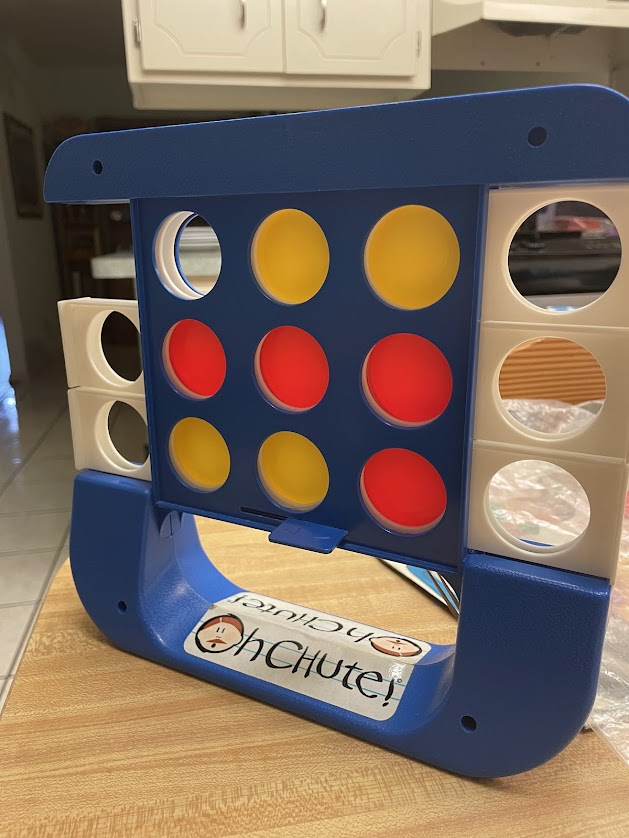
Oh Chute! (1984 game)

Oh Chute! is a two player game. It was advertised as "a family game full of surprises." The object is to line up 3 discs of the same color in a row horizontally, vertically or diagonally. A play consists of either playing a disc or moving a slide one hole to either side. Moving a slide may cause a disc to fall out of the frame changing the entire pattern of play.
