= Why (board game) =

- Other names: Alfred Hitchcock Presents Why; Whay, a Mystery Game
- Publishers: Milton Bradley
- Publication: 1958; 68 years ago
- Years active: xxxx–?
- Genres: board game
- Languages: English
- Players: 2–4
- Playing time: 45'
- Age range: 12+

Why is a board game created by the Milton Bradley Company and released in 1958. Based on the television show Alfred Hitchcock Presents, the game is no longer produced. There are two different releases of the game: the original version and the 1967 version, differing only in the box art.

== Overview ==
Why can be played by two to four players, aged 12 to adult. The four gamepiece characters are each humorous allusions to detectives of popular media fiction: Sergeant Monday (Sergeant Friday), Dick Crazy (Dick Tracy), Charlie Clam (Charlie Chan), and Shylock Bones (Sherlock Holmes). The six "ghosts" in the game are each based on actual historical figures: Daniel Boone, Pocahontas, Napoleon, Nero, Cleopatra and Henry the Eighth. The weapons in the game are a rope, a gun, poison, and an ax. The motive cards include the "Jealousy," "Lover's Quarrel," "Self Defense."

The object of the game is to capture one ghost, one weapon, and one motive card. There are four cards for each ghost and weapon. An alternative way to win is capturing the six Alfred Hitchcock cards and the "It's A Mystery To Me" card. Each player is dealt seven cards and start out in the Living Room. The remaining cards are dealt evenly into the six rooms. A player can only have up to seven cards in his or her hand at one time. A player is able to obtain more cards from the lawn, from another player, or from another room.

To acquire cards from the lawn, a player must first make it to the Living Room by rolling a 7, 11, doubles, or the player's normal roll. Then they have to prove they have that type of card by showing it and then flipping over the card they want. If they are correct, they take the card. If they are incorrect, they must put down the card they thought it was and take the wrong card. For one player to take from another, they must be on the same space as each other or in the same room. A player challenges another player's card by first proving that they have one of its set. If they do have the card, they must give it to the player or they can give them a "No Clue" card and this card is removed from the game. If they do not have the card, they are then able to challenge that player for a card with the same rules applying. The player's turn ends after this. To get a card from a room, they must first make it to the room by rolling a 7, 11, doubles, or through the regular roll. Then they pick up the top card and discard the same card or another card if applicable into the lawn.

== Game-play ==
To begin the game, each player rolls the dice to see who goes first. The player with the highest roll begins and play proceeds to the left. If a player rolls 7, 11, or doubles they are able to advance to any room of their choosing. Otherwise, they advance through the hallway spaces. They can travel in either direction, but cannot backtrack.

If all cards have been taken from the rooms then the required cards for winning must be in either a players hand or in the lawn. All players advance through the Living Room by rolling a 7, 11, doubles, or through a standard dice roll. Once all the players are in the Living Room a new set of rules is followed.

A player can challenge another player if they roll a 7, 11, or doubles with standard challenge rules applying. A player can pick from the lawn if they roll an odd number. Standard discard rules apply except when a player discards one of their cards back into the lawn, they place it face-up. If a player rolls an even number, they lose their turn.

== Special rules ==
For two players, only 34 of 60 cards are used. Three complete ghosts, two complete weapons, three motive, and three "No Clue" cards are removed from the pack. Additionally only rooms 1-4 are used and 5 and 6 are left empty. For three players, only 48 of 60 cards are used. Two complete ghosts and one complete weapon is removed from the pack. All six rooms are still used.

If a player wants a card from the Lawn and they don't have one of that kind in their hand, they may falsely identify the card wanted, in order to pick it up. For example: If a player was collecting Cleopatra cards and another player wished to hinder him, they may pick up a Cleopatra card from the lawn in this way: Show any card from their hand such as an Ax, point to the Cleopatra card on the lawn and say, "This is an Ax card." Since they pointed to the wrong card (on purpose), now they must pick up the Cleopatra card and lay down the Ax card.

For a more difficult game, cards are kept on the lawn face down until the end of the game. Also players may complete and lay down more than one Ghost to increase their Rewards. However, to end the game, the Mystery must be solved as before. Now players add up their Rewards, counting their cards on the table and in their hands. One complete ghost or weapon is worth $500.00. One complete Alfred Hitchcock is worth $1000.00. The player that ends the game earns $1000.00 as well. Motive and "No Clue" cards have no value. $200.00 is deducting for each part of Alfred a player has at the end of the game or the "It's A Mystery to Me" card. With these additional rules, each player receiving the largest reward wins the game.

== See also ==
- Alfred Hitchcock's Mystery Magazine
