= Square Mile (board game) =

- Publishers: Milton Bradley
- Players: 2–4
- Setup time: 2–10 minutes
- Playing time: not specified
- Chance: Low
- Age range: 12 +
- Skills: Strategic thought

Square Mile was the land development board game released by Milton Bradley in 1962. It is for 2–4 players.

== Gameplay ==
The square mile is divided into sixteen tracts, most of which are zoned (at the beginning of the game) for certain types of development. Each player has the role of a real estate developer starting the game with $100,000 and one free tract (decided randomly). Then there is a round where players bid on additional tracts that may be had at very cheap prices; the number of tracts that each player bids on is determined by how many players are in the game. Then a number of road segments are built: One plus one per player.

The rest of the game, players take turns, each of which consists of the following phases:

1. Sell: Sell any property, in any stage of development, at market value.
2. Develop: Pay the cost to increase the value of any number of tracts that you own, only one type of which may be used per turn:
  - Build roads: $10,000 for a road or $15,000 for a road with a bridge.
  - Subdivide: A tract must have roads on all four sides before it can be subdivided (for $25,000)
  - Construct buildings: If a tract is zoned for a particular type of buildings, that type of buildings must be built there; otherwise, any type of buildings may be built. (But the banker must reserve enough of the available buildings for those tracts that are zoned for them.) The cost of buildings vary depending on type.
3. Buy: Buy, at market value, any tracts not fully developed or already owned. Each player may own at most five tracts.

Market value of a tract depends on how it is zoned and the state of development. The market value and development costs are shown on a chart that is visible to all players.

The game ends when the last tract of land is bought that is not fully developed. Then players total the amount of cash that they have plus the market value of tracts owned. The player with the greatest total is the winner.

== Reception ==
In the March 1989 edition of Games International (Issue #3), Phil Orbanes mourned the loss of this game, saying, "At the risk of exaggerating, I think the game was nothing less than a sheer delight to behold — and play." After reviewing its strong points and the mistakes in marketing that he believed had led to its demise, Orbanes concluded, "If brought back today, Square Mile might need some modernisation, but its essential play qualities would be very attractive to all game players who enjoy financial manipulation."
