= Educational Toy Money =

Children's game with play money

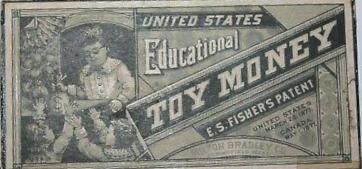
Educational Toy Money c.1890

Educational Toy Money (also titled Bradley's Toy Money, Toy Money, and Bradley's Toy Money Complete with Game of Banking), is a set of play money that was first produced by the Milton Bradley Company in 1877. It was valued as an educational tool in the United States for several decades, and Milton Bradley continued to publish it until the middle of the twentieth century.

== Description ==
In the years following the American Civil War, Milton Bradley became very interested in the education of young children, and he made educational toys and games the focus of his company for many years. One of these was Toy Money, which was distributed to schools across the country to teach children the value of money.

The box originally included a set of two-sided imitation coins printed on cardboard, with designs that exactly duplicated American coins in circulation, including a mint year. The coins included 1¢, 2¢, 5¢, 10¢, 25¢, 50¢, $1, $3, $10 and $20. Paper bills were likewise the same size and design as actual bills in circulation. A note on the box assured buyers "This is an exact Fac-simile, on cardboard, of the common current coins in use, making not only an exceedingly amusing but at the same time a very instructive toy, the playing with which must of necessity impress upon the youthful mind the value of the different coins and the art of making change with ease and accuracy, thereby laying the foundation for Elementary Arithmetic, even in the nursery."

The coins were so similar to American currency that at the turn of the 20th century, they ran afoul of federal legislation regarding counterfeit money, and the company was ordered to redesign the currency to include the word "educational". From that point on, the date was removed from the currency, and the coins only displayed the denomination on one side, and the words "Educational Toy Money / Milton Bradley Co." on the other side. Likewise the paper bills had to be enlarged and "Educational" added.

For several decades afterwards, the company printed a long disclaimer on the inside of the box lid that read "Our Educational Toy Money has for years been a leading article in the school and toy trade of the country. The legislation relating to printed money recently aimed at some of the bills used by commercial schools, and for advertising purposes, has been interpreted to also cover our Toy Money, as originally published. In order to strictly comply with the laws and in order to protect dealers and users of our money we have prepared new designs of the exact size of the actual coin. These designs have been accepted by the proper authority at Washington and we can offer the present form to the public with the assurance that it is no moral or actual encroachment upon the most stringent interpretation of the recent laws."

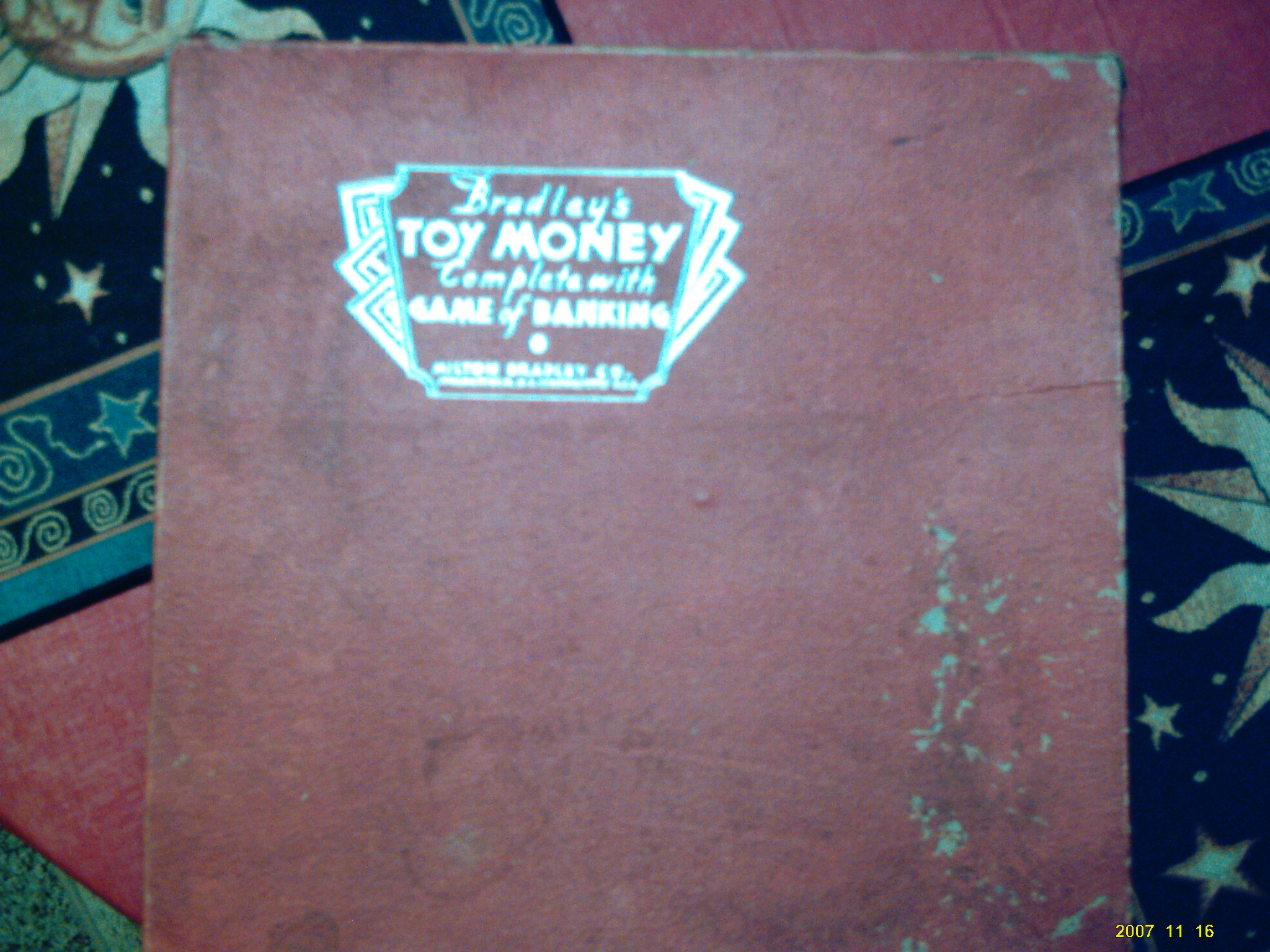
20th-century edition that includes banking game

In later editions in the 20th century, rules for a banking game were added to the box, and the title was expanded to Bradley's Toy Money Complete with Game of Banking. This edition also included two black billfolds.

=== Gameplay ===
The Game of Banking is an educational game for 2-6 players that teaches children how to make change and count money. A set of cards with banking instructions is placed face down on the table, and every player is given $10. The first player turns over a card and follows the instructions, which may be to either

- deposit money in the bank to pay poll tax, rent, income tax, repairs to car, interest on car, payment on car, excise tax, repairs to house, interest on mortgage, or service charges; or
- take money from the bank because of income from profits on bonds, interest, a legacy, a bonus, trust fund, profit on stocks, withdrawals, profit on property, wages, dividends, Christmas fund, vacation club or insurance income.

As each player draws a card and follows the instruction, they must make the correct change themselves. The first player to accumulate $25 is the winner.

Educational Toy Money c. 1950

== Publication history ==
Although toy money first appeared in Germany in the middle of the 19th century, Milton Bradley pioneered the use of toy money in the United States. Educational Toy Money was first printed in 1877, and various editions also appeared using the titles Bradley's Toy Money, and Toy Money. It rapidly became an educational tool valued by schools. In an 1889 issue of The School Journal, W.R. Prentice, a school superintendent in Hornellsville, New York (now Hornell, NY), mentioned Bradley's Toy Money as an essential tool in teaching children to count. An 1891 editorial in the Journal of Education warned against using educational toys that were "fads", and added, "Not all new and fashionable devices are fads. Bradley's Toy Money is new and fashionable, but it is not a fad. It should be classed with the classics because it partakes of the elements that have made some devices classic."

In the 20th century, a banking game was added to the box and the title lengthened to Bradley's Toy Money and Banking Game. After World War II, the title returned to Educational Toy Money and Toy Money, and continued to be published by Milton Bradley until 1950.

== Other recognition ==
Three copies of Toy Money are held in the Smithsonian National Museum of American History:

- Authorized Edition of Toy Money for the Home-School and Kindergarten, c. 1910 (ID Number 2018.0180.01)
- Authorized Edition of Toy Money for the Home-School and Kindergarten, c. 1925 (ID Number 2018.0180.02)
- Toy Money: Bright Coins and Bills, c.1935 (ID Number 2018.0180.03)
