= Don't Spill the Beans =

Children's game

- Designers: Schaper Toys
- Publishers: Milton Bradley Company (formerly), Hasbro (currently)
- Publication: 1957
- Genres: Board game
- Players: 2-4
- Playing time: 10 minutes
- Age range: 3+
- Skills: Chance

Don't Spill the Beans is a children's game for 2 or more players, designed for ages 3–6, published by the Milton Bradley Company, a subsidiary of Hasbro. The game was originally manufactured by Schaper Toys, but acquired by Milton Bradley in 1986 through its then owner, Tyco Toys. The game is described by Hasbro as a "Classic Preschool Game. A Favorite For More Than 30 Years!".

== Game play ==
The object of the game is to toss all one's plastic beans into a cauldron (pretending that it is very hot and cooking) without touching it or tipping it over, which "spills the beans". In the 1960s version, the beans were real kidney beans. Players are given a pile of beans, and take turns placing them inside a plastic tipping pot. If a player's bean causes the pot to spill over, all the spilled beans are added to their pile. Play continues until one player has put all of their beans into the pot making them the winner.
