= OMNI Entertainment System =

1980s video game console

- Also known as: OMNI
- Developer: Milton Bradley
- Manufacturer: MB Electronics
- Released: 1980
- Introductory price: $119.99 (1980) = ($376.88) in 2021
- Discontinued: Unknown - certainly before 1990
- Storage: 8-track tape cartridges
- Display: 4 x 2-character seven segment display
- Sound: Mono
- Controller input: 4 built-in keyboards/number pads, one on each side.

The OMNI Entertainment System was an electronic stand-alone game system produced by the MB Electronics division of the Milton Bradley Company, released in 1980.

== Function ==
The system played primarily trivia question games from 8-track tape cartridges. The game system was entirely self-contained with its own Monaural speaker and four 2-character seven segment displays to show points as well as when the game required input.

Up to four players each interacted with the game with a row of 11 electronic buttons. Buttons were primarily labelled 0-9 with the final button showing an asterisk-like symbol as an Enter key. Each button was also labelled with colors in rainbow order from yellow, to red, to blue, to green, as well as with clusters of letters. Button zero on the left doubled as a "Go" button.

The system heavily leveraged the audio format of the 8-track tape cartridge for gameplay, but additionally included binary encoded data containing information on scoring and the correct answers on non-audible channels, making the OMNI a programmable system. The system could freely change between playing audio (or reading data) from either the left or right audio channel. The system could also play regular music 8-track cartridges, although not in stereo.

== Gameplay ==
Each 8-track tape contained four game programs, and the system featured a channel selector dial on the top to choose which program to play. After inserting a tape and adjusting volume via a slider on top next to the channel selector, each player participating would need to press enter. Subsequently, players would be asked questions played back from the tape. Players would then be asked to answer as quickly as possible (indicated by dashes on the display), by selecting the correct colour, number, or spelling out a word and pressing Enter; this would cause the tape to advance forward and reveal the correct answer. Players were then awarded typically between 1 and 4 points, with the first player usually receiving an additional point or points for answering first. The Jeopardy cartridge varied from this scoring system, following along the lines of the Jeopardy scoring system from the first rounds of a game. After all players answered, the correct answer would be revealed and the points on the displays updated. At the end of the game the winning player would be indicated. Occasional music interludes (such as in the Password Plus game) would occur while the tape played to the correct location to continue game play. Occasionally the display of the player with the leading score would also flash.

== Released game cartridges ==
Title	Notes
For The Fun Of It!	
Games hosted by Big Bird and other Sesame Street friends	Licensed from the Children's Television Workshop
Jeopardy	Licensed from the producers of the TV game show
Music Quiz	
Password Plus+	Licensed from the producers of the TV game show
Pat Summerall's Baseball Quiz	
Pat Summerall's Football Quiz	
Pat Summerall's Sports Quiz	
Re·Action Quiz	
The Variety Programmed Game Cartridge	Four different sample quizzes; included with the system
Vincent Price's Movie Trivia	
Vincent Price's TV Trivia	
Words - Words - Words	
