= Milton (game) =

Electronic talking game

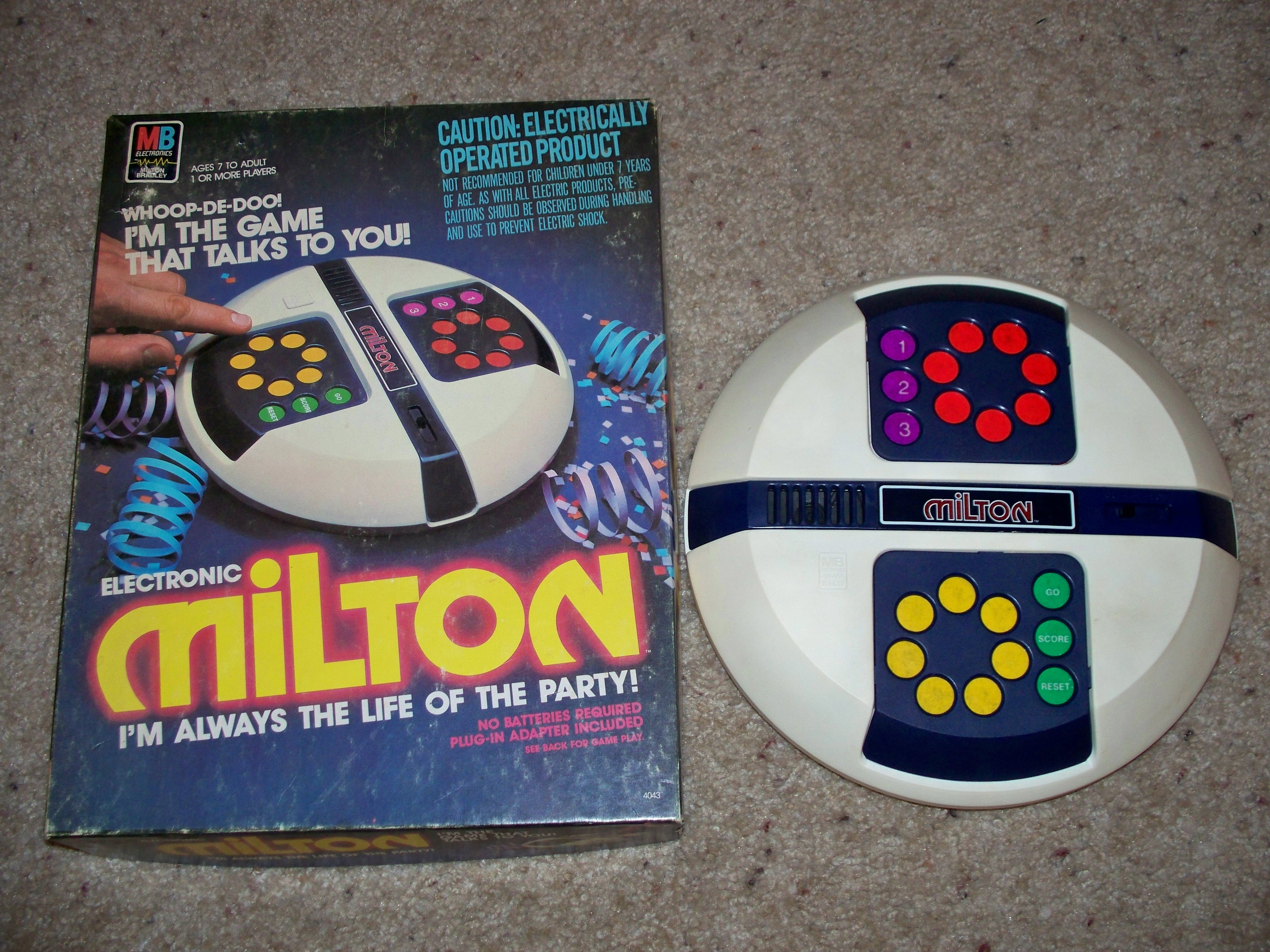
- Manufacturers: Milton Bradley Company
- Publishers: Milton Bradley Company
- Players: 1 or more
- Age range: 4 to adult

Milton is an electronic talking game. According to the patent, Milton was the first electronic talking game that allowed two people to play against each other. Previously released devices of this type, such as Speak & Spell by Texas Instruments, were known primarily as teaching devices rather than competitive games.

It was manufactured and distributed by Milton Bradley Company in 1980 and invented by Jeffrey D. Breslow and Erick E. Erickson. The game is a single electronic unit with colored buttons, powered by an AC adapter.

== Gameplay ==
Milton is essentially a game of memory skill. It has some similarities to Simon, which is a popular electronic game that was introduced in 1978, also by Milton Bradley. The object of Milton is to correctly recall and match up spoken phrases, as opposed to Simon's patterns of light and sound. Although the release of Milton may have been an attempt to cash in on Simon's popularity, the game did not meet with the same level of success.

There are 7 red and 7 yellow buttons on Milton. When the game begins, Milton recites 7 correctly completed three-word phrases. Player 1 then presses any one of the top red phrase buttons and listens to the beginning half of a phrase. The same player then presses one of the bottom yellow buttons and listens to the end of a phrase. If the match is correct, Player 1 scores a point and Player 2 takes a turn. If the match is incorrect, Milton will respond negatively with a sarcastic laugh, a razz sound, or by saying the attempt was "Garbage", "Ridiculous", "Absurd", or "No Way". A successful strategy is to remember the locations of incorrect matches, since on the next turn one may be able to use either the beginning or end of that phrase to complete another match successfully.

== Development ==
Milton's electronic voice was designed to sound more human by featuring an accent and casual dialect.

At the time, electronics capable of speech were a novelty. Due to limited memory, the speech synthesizer had to reuse various wave samples in multiple contexts, producing what is called "ersatz speech." Programming and editing words through such a process was lengthy and involved for the designers.

While the game's chip only required 15 bytes of input, not all 15 bytes could be used to full precision since that would have required 700K of read-only memory and a bit rate of 12,000 to produce a frame rate of 100 Hz—which was impractical at the time.

== Reception ==
Milton was one of the seven games featured on the April 1980 cover of Playthings magazine for the Special Toy Fair issue.

The September 1980 Popular Mechanics wrote, "We would have played more with Milton from Milton-Bradley, but the long line of people waiting to be insulted by this talking wonder discouraged us."
