= Star Bird =

Electronic toy

Star Bird is a plastic-bodied, electronic handheld toy that was produced by MB Electronics from 1978 until ca. 1981. It was developed by Bing McCoy, who designed a number of successful toys in the late 1970s including Electronic Battleship and ROM the Spaceknight.

== Specifications ==
The Star Bird manual describes it as "THE AMAZING SPACESHIP with realistic engine sounds and flashing laser blasts". The toy was constructed in three main pieces: the front inner hull which held the electronics and front lasers, the front outer hull (a thin plastic shell over the inner hull), the main body consisting of the center stalk like section and wings. A molded plastic engine piece fit into the rear of the main body and was removable. The toy is only used in three configurations: the Star Bird which consists of all available pieces, the Star Bird Fighter which is mostly only the front hull attached to the bare engine piece, and the Star Bird Orbiter which is the main body without the front outer hull. When turned on the Star Bird mimics an engine sound. If the toy is pointed upwards the sound is altered by a ball bearing switch to suggest a Doppler effect from acceleration or taking-off, while a nose-down orientation gives the sound of decelerating engines. A button at the rear of the cockpit activates the LEDs at the front of the toy, along with a blast noise, to simulate the firing of its lasers. The button was designed to be pressed by the thumb while the ship was held by the main body or engine piece (in "dragster" configuration). Two simple, detachable drone-like "Interceptors" are provided at the end of each wing. Star Bird also had a rotating laser turret which doubled as an escape-pod/orbiter-type ship. Very much to the dismay of current-day collectors the twin lasers from the turret are often missing in today's offerings of the play set.

=== Configuration ===
The dragster configuration is notably out of scale with the others as, for the craft to be the small, fast, maneuverable fighter its design implies it would have to be much smaller than the scale of the escape pod and interceptor pieces (and of the simple plastic astronaut figures supplied with the play set).

== Variants ==
Along with the original Star Bird, a Japanese exclusive was also released. Unlike the other models, this version came in one piece, was available in two paint schemes (Red and White, and Silvery-Gray and Black), and sported foldout wheels and plastic missile projectiles. This version is unofficially known as "the Bandai Star Bird." This version is hard to obtain.

The Star Bird Space Avenger had red flame decals on a white chassis.

In accordance to local markets' demands the packaging for the Star Bird was manufactured in English, French, Spanish, German (Supervogel) and Dutch. The Command Base came in German packaging as well.

== Related products ==
A Star Bird Command Base, arrived on the market in 1979.

The Star Bird Intruder had a black hull and consisted of the cockpit and Interceptor section only. It featured a pistol grip and feature that, when used along with the original toy could be used to simulate space dogfighting. The Intruder hit the market in 1980, mainly in the USA and UK.
