= Dragonmaster (card game) =

Card game

- Designers: G. D'Arcey
- Illustrators: Bob Pepper
- Publishers: Milton Bradley
- Publication: 1981; 45 years ago
- Years active: 1981–?
- Genres: Card game
- Languages: English
- Players: 1
- Playing time: 30'
- Age range: 12+

Dragonmaster is a card game for 3–4 players that was published by Milton Bradley in 1981.

== Components ==
Dragonmaster is a trick-taking card game. The game comes with

- a deck of 33 character cards:
  - four suits of eight cards each (king, queen, prince or princess, wizard, duke, count, baron, and fool)
  - one dragon card
- five special "hand" cards, each with a different trick-taking rule listed on the front:
  - Don't take the first or last trick.
  - Don't take the Prince of the suit called Warriors
  - Don't take any Dragonlords
  - Don't take any Wizards
  - Don't take any of the above.
- a rank-order card
- 60 plastic jewels
- a drawstring pouch for the jewels

The artwork was by Bob Pepper.

== Object of the game ==
Each player tries to accumulate the greatest number of gems by the end of either fifteen hands for a three-player game, or twenty hands for a four-player game.

== Gameplay ==
=== Basic game ===
The Dragon card is removed from the deck for the basic game.

A "round" consists of five hands; each hand consists of five tricks. The dealer during the round is the "Dragonmaster". For the first hand of the round, the Dragonmaster deals five cards to each player. The Dragonmaster then selects one of the five special "hand" cards; its trick-taking rule must be followed by all players for the entire hand.

The Dragonmaster leads the first card of the hand. All players must follow suit if possible; the highest card of the proper suit wins the trick. The lead passes to the player who won the trick.

If a player is unable to follow the rule stipulated on the special "hand" card, that player must pay a fine in jewels to the Dragonmaster.

At the end of the hand (five tricks), the Dragonmaster deals another hand of five cards, and play continues as before.

At the end of a round (five hands), the role of Dragonmaster passes to the player to the left of the current dealer.

=== Advanced game ===
In the Advanced game, the Dragon card is shuffled into the deck. If a player is dealt the Dragon card, that player must either discard it, or sometime during that round, declare that they will attempt a "power play".

- If the player discards the Dragon card, then the game continues as normal.
- If the player declares a power play, then at the start of a hand sometime during the round, the player selects one of the "hand" cards and attempts to fulfill the conditions for a successful power play listed on the reverse of the card. (For example, the player might have to capture all the wizards during that hand.)

If the power play is successful, the other players must pay that player a number of jewels, and the player becomes the Dragonmaster for the rest of the round. If the player's power player fails, then the player must pay the Dragonmaster a fine in jewels.

=== Expert advanced game ===
The expert game allows for a secret powerplay. If the player with the Dragon card does not want to attempt a powerplay, all players except the current Dragonmaster can secretly attempt to meet the powerplay conditions listed on the back of one of the hand cards, with the same rewards or penalties as the Advanced game.

== Victory conditions ==
The game ends when each player has been Dragonmaster for one round (five hands). The player who accumulated the most jewels during their time as Dragonmaster is the winner.

== Reception ==
In the May 1983 edition of Dragon (Issue #73), Glenn Rahman admired the high production values, saying that "Its components are of the highest quality [...] The cards are printed on thick paper stock and are exceptionally handsome [...] The colors are rich; the detail and poses are imaginative, powerful, and evocative. This artwork is the best selling feature of the game." But despite the high quality of the cards, Rahman found the actual game to be "a bland and simplistic cardgame." He thought that the game components would be useful as props for a fantasy role-playing game, but concluded "Unfortunately, as a game in itself, Dragonmaster cannot be recommended."
