= Ants in the Pants (game) =

Board game

- Other names: Ants in the Can (Sesame Street edition); Ants in the SquarePants (SpongeBob SquarePants edition)
- Designers: Marvin Glass & Assoc.
- Publishers: Schaper Toys; Milton Bradley
- Publication: 1969; 57 years ago
- Years active: 1969–?
- Genres: Game
- Languages: English
- Players: 2–4
- Playing time: 10'
- Age range: 4+

Ants in the Pants is a game designed by Marvin Glass and Associates, who sold the rights to William H. Schaper, and was originally produced in 1969 by Schaper's company Schaper Toys. In 1986 it was purchased by Hasbro, which still manufactures and markets the game.

The name refers to an idiomatic expression in English which asserts that nervous, fidgety people must have "ants in their pants." The English word "antsy" (meaning nervous) also derives from this metaphor.

== Game play ==
The fundamental pieces involved in Ants in the Pants are a free-standing pair of miniature, usually plastic, pants; and several plastic ants. The ants are color coded - each player uses one color of ants - and designed so that pressing the tail stores elastic potential energy. When the tail is pressed and released, the ants spring into the air.

The object of Ants in the Pants is for the players to spring as many of their ants as possible into the pants.

Some versions of Ants in the Pants include characters who "wear" the pants. These (usually cardboard) cutouts depict the character, and also serve as backboards to deflect the ants into the pants. Plastic suspenders (or braces) are another common element, which serve as obstacles.

== Pop culture ==
This game appeared in the South Park episode "Damien", in which Cartman receives the game as a gift instead of the toy he wanted, and throws a tantrum.
