= Park and Shop (game) =

Park and Shop board game

- Other names: Park & Shop
- Designers: Donald Miller
- Publishers: Milton Bradley
- Publication: 1950; 76 years ago
- Years active: 1950–?
- Genres: Board game
- Languages: English
- Players: 2–6
- Playing time: 30'
- Age range: 5+

Park and Shop was a board game sold by the Milton-Bradley Company of Springfield, MA. Developed shortly after World War II, it has similarities to Monopoly in that the game’s genesis is based on a city in the United States, in this case, Allentown, PA. The game was designed “For ages 5 to adult” and was advertised as “The Nation’s Traffic Game Sensation.”

== Origins ==
Park and Shop has its roots in the “Park & Shop” concept, developed in Allentown as a way to bring people into the Central Business and Shopping District. In 1947, Donald Miller, Allentown businessman and former owner of The Morning Call newspaper worked with other businessmen to create a way to bring crowds back to downtown Allentown after the war. Park & Shop (the concept) was based on the then-novel idea that shoppers who got their parking ticket validated at a store could park free at nearby parking lots. Initially, four lots were created; eventually, there were 25 parking lots. Older buildings and homes in the area that were no longer in use were torn down to create the lots. During the 1950s, the concept was known as the "Allentown Plan" and was copied across the nation in other cities looking to boost downtown activity.

== The Original Game ==
Campe Euwer was an artist with the local Allentown paper The Morning Call. He was approached by the Chamber of Commerce of Allentown and the Municipal Parking Authority to commission a public awareness campaign for the new “Park & Shop” concept. The result was Park and Shop – the game – designed with downtown Allentown in mind. The board does not feature any named streets, but the shape of the route of the initial game is similar to the area in Allentown where the Park & Shop concept was located. Typical stores and services line the streets, like a 5&10 store, bank, bakery, oil & gas, furs, haberdasher, supermarket, barbershop, paint store, and many more.

The game was first introduced in 1952 by Traffic Games Inc., a small firm in Allentown owned by Euwer as a publicity stunt for the Park & Shop concept. The object of the game was to drive from “home” to a parking lot, then complete several “shopping” actions and return home. Dice control movement is by both car (“motorist” mode – one die) and walking (“pedestrian” mode – both dice). In addition, movement can be affected by several cards that may be drawn when landing on specific squares. Players can lose a turn, get a free turn, alter movement, add additional shopping requirements – even go to jail! The winner was the first person to complete all of their shopping and drive home. It was a hit and gained both popularity and the attention of games company Milton-Bradley.

== Milton-Bradley and Modifications ==
Milton-Bradley bought the rights to the game in 1954 and made a few changes. Most noticeable is the more-symmetrical board layout. In the Traffic Games version, the ‘Free space” is not centered (perhaps because that's just the way the streets of Allentown were laid out?), but it is centrally located in the Milton-Bradley version. Also, the rules now included a “money version” where players had to pay for their shopping purchases, plus library fines, parking tickets, etc. The first person to complete their shopping was awarded bonus points, then all players were credited for money remaining and shopping cards completed, with penalties for any uncompleted shopping cards. The winner was the player with the most points – it was possible to be the first person to complete shopping and yet not win the game due to paying more for purchases, fines, etc. One other change was that playing pieces were plastic, not metal as in the original game. There was also an Australian version of the game distributed by John Sands Ltd, in 1955.

In 1960 the game board and graphics were updated and old-style shops (like the "Smoke Shop") were replaced, and then in 1970, the game was completely modernized. Gone were the plastic game pieces, replaced by cardboard punch-outs, and the board was radically transformed from a downtown grid to a more “shopping mall” overlay. Gone were many of the old stores, and all the irregularities of the old design were changed into a more homogenized layout. At some point in the 1970s, the game was discontinued.

Pictures of all four game versions that show the dramatic changes of the board layout over the years as well as the playing pieces, from metal to plastic to cardboard can be found at the website BoardGameGeek.com (see external links below).

== Notes ==
- Some credit has been given to Donald Miller for the creation of Park and Shop (the game). While he was the originator of the Park & Shop concept for the city of Allentown, it was Euwer who drew up the map and created the cards used in the game, and was President of Traffic Game, Inc., the original distributor of the game.
- Also, note the distinction between the parking concept (Park & Shop, with an ampersand), and the game (Park AND Shop).
- Like many board games, there are plenty of optional rules created by players. One rule often mentioned in forums is if two players land on the same square, then both lose a turn, unless one is a pedestrian and one is a car, in which case the car does not lose a turn but the player as pedestrian must go to the Medical Center and lose two turns. Another variation is "Park and Shop Race" where all players have their own set of dice and play is continuous without turns (chaotic, but just like real shopping). See forums at BoardGameGeek.com (see external links below) for other playing variations.
