= Toy Association =

American trade association

The Toy Association
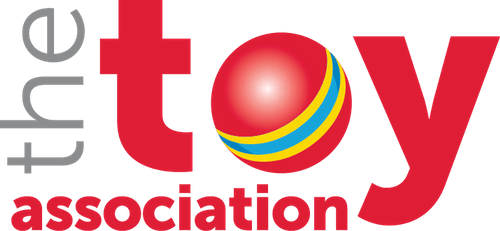
- Type: Trade association
- Industry: Toy industry
- Founded: June 9, 1916; 110 years ago
- Headquarters: New York City, US
- Key people: Sharon Price John, Chairman; Greg Ahearn, President/CEO
- Website: toyassociation.org

The Toy Association is an American trade association for the US toy industry.

== Description ==
The Toy Association leads the health and growth of the U.S. toy industry, which has an annual U.S. economic impact of $102.8 billion, and represents hundreds of companies including manufacturers, retailers, licensors, and others who are involved in the youth entertainment industry. Its manufacturing members drive the annual $41 billion U.S. domestic toy market. It was founded in 1915 by A. C. Gilbert, as the Toy Manufacturers of America, and he became its first president.

The average price of a toy is around $10, but the estimated 3 billion units sold across the United States each year generates approximately $41 billion in direct toy sales. From toy inventors to store clerks, the toy industry supports an estimated 573,379 jobs (FTE) generating more than $33.8 billion in wages for U.S. workers. The toy industry generates $11.1 billion in tax revenue each year.

The Toy Association produces Toy Fair New York, the largest toy show in the Western Hemisphere. Other initiatives include educating consumers on safe play via PlaySafe.org, advocating for strong legislation that will ban the sale of unsafe, counterfeit toys (among other issues of priority to toy companies), promoting the value of play through The Genius of Play initiative, and delivering the gift of play to children in underprivileged communities through its philanthropic arm, The Toy Foundation.

== Toy of the Year Awards ==
The trade association administers the TOTY (Toy of the Year) Awards program, recognizing the best of the best in toys, games and properties each year. All proceeds from the awards program benefit The Toy Foundation's programs to bring toys & play to children in need globally.
