= Milton Bradley =

American publisher and game designer

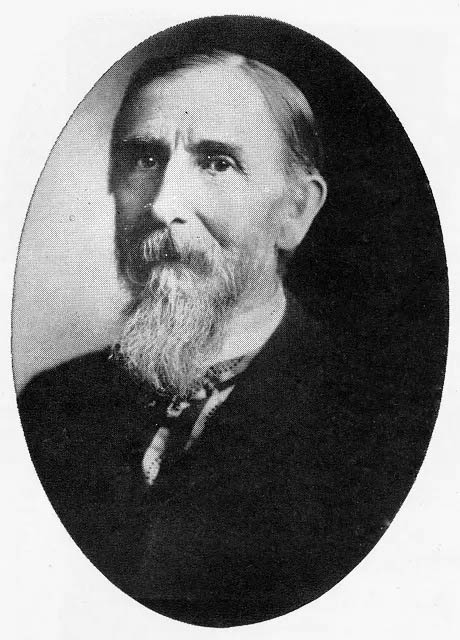
- Born: November 8, 1836; Vienna, Maine, U.S.
- Died: May 30, 1911 (aged 74); Springfield, Massachusetts, U.S.
- Occupations: Entrepreneur; Board game manufacturer
- Known for: Founder of the Milton Bradley Company

Milton Bradley (November 8, 1836 – May 30, 1911) was an American business magnate, game pioneer and publisher, credited by many with launching the board game industry, with his eponymous enterprise, which was purchased by Hasbro in 1984, and folded in 1998.

== Biography ==
Born in Vienna, Maine, in 1836, to Lewis and Fannie (née Lyford) Bradley, Milton Bradley grew up in a working-class and Christian household. The family moved to Lowell, Massachusetts, in 1847. After completing high school in 1854, he found work as a draftsman and patent agent before enrolling at the Lawrence Scientific School in Cambridge, Massachusetts. He was unable to finish his studies after moving with his family to Hartford, Connecticut, where he could not find gainful employment. In 1856, Bradley moved to Springfield, Massachusetts, where he worked as a mechanical draftsman.

In 1859, Bradley went to Providence, Rhode Island, to learn lithography; and, in 1860, he set up the first color lithography shop in Springfield. He moved forward with an idea he had for a board game which he called The Checkered Game of Life, an early version of what later became The Game of Life.

== The Milton Bradley Company ==
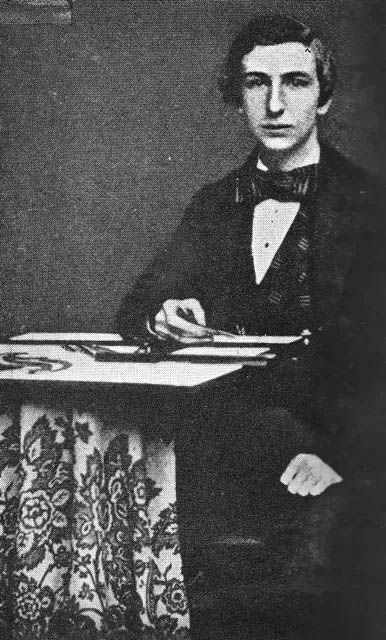
A young Bradley in the 1860s

Bradley's ventures into the production of board games began with a large failure in his lithograph business. When he printed and sold an image of the little-known Republican presidential nominee Abraham Lincoln, Bradley's work was initially met with great success. However, Lincoln decided to grow his distinctive beard after Bradley's print was published, leading customers to demand their money back because the image was no longer accurate. The prints suddenly became worthless, and Bradley burned his remaining inventory. Looking for a lucrative alternate project, he found inspiration from an imported board game a friend gave him, concluding that he could produce and market a similar game to American consumers. In the winter of 1860, Bradley released The Checkered Game of Life.

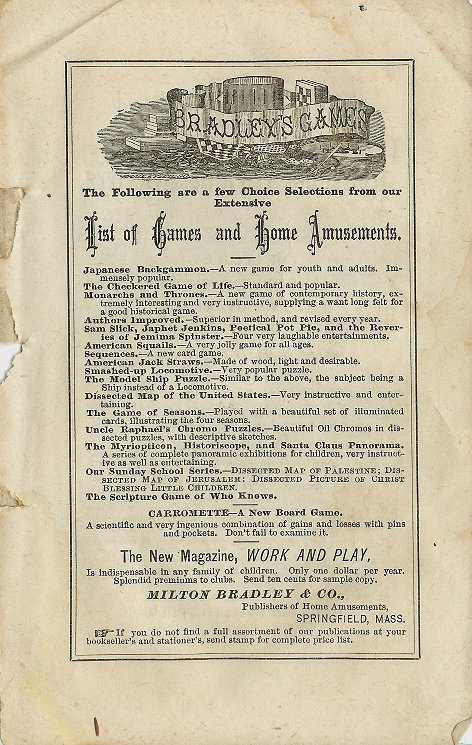
1872 advertisement for the Milton Bradley Company

The game proved an instant success. Bradley personally sold his first run of several hundred copies in a two-day visit to New York; by 1861, consumers had bought more than 45,000 copies. The Checkered Game of Life followed a structure similar to its American and British predecessors, with players spinning a teetotum to advance to squares representing social virtues and vices, such as "influence" or "poverty", with the former earning a player points and the latter slowing their progress. But even the most seemingly secure positions, like "Fat Office", held dangers – "Prison", "Ruin", and "Suicide". The first player to accumulate 100 points won the game.

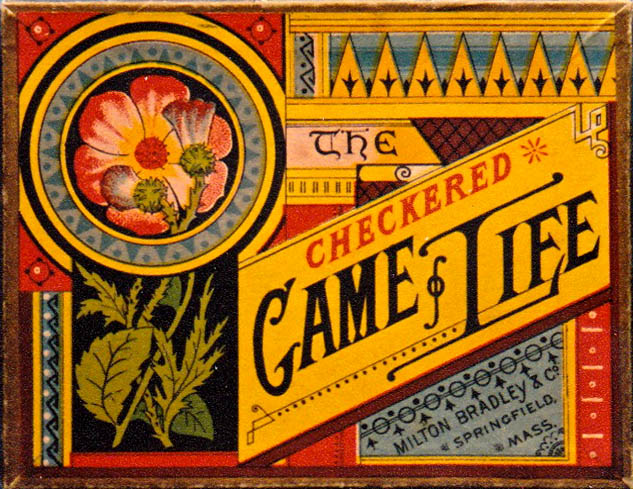
The original cover of The Checkered Game of Life, the first board game released by MB

While the structure of play in The Checkered Game of Life differed little from previous board games, Bradley's game embraced a radically different concept of success. Earlier games, such as the popular Mansion of Happiness created in Puritan Massachusetts, focused entirely on promoting moral virtue. Bradley defined success in secular business terms, depicting life as a quest for accomplishment with personal virtues as a means to that end. This complemented America's burgeoning fascination with obtaining wealth, and with "the causal relationship between character and wealth," in the years following the Civil War. The game—and later board games produced by the Milton Bradley Company—also fit the nation's increasing amount of leisure time, leading to great financial success for the company.

From 1860 through the 20th century, the company he founded, Milton Bradley Company, dominated the production of American games, including The Game of Life, Easy Money, Candy Land, Operation, and Battleship. The company was a subsidiary of Pawtucket, Rhode Island–based firm Hasbro from acquisition in 1984 to shutdown in 1998. MB merged with Parker Brothers in 1998 to form Hasbro Games. The two became brands of Hasbro until 2009 when they were retired in favor of the parent company's name; the Milton Bradley name had been in use for 149 years.

== Late career ==
Bradley published tracts and pamphlets on Friedrich Fröbel's kindergarten system. His company produced two magazines, Kindergarten News (later Kindergarten Review), and Work and Play. Neither was profitable, and Bradley's business partners withdrew their support, but Bradley persevered, publishing both magazines until the end of his life. His friend George Tapley bought out the partner's shares so that Bradley could continue manufacturing educational materials.

By the 1890s, the Milton Bradley Company had introduced the first standardized watercolor sets. Bradley based these materials on a six-spectrum color system. This color system included eighteen pure spectrum colors along with two systematic tints and shades, allowing colors to be reproduced with greater accuracy. As well as the watercolor sets, Bradley also established educational games such as Bradley's Word Builder and Bradley's Sentence Builder. Bradley was also the first to release crayon packages with standardized colors, a forerunner of the Binney & Smith company's Crayola crayons and Artista art supplies. Bradley's interest in art education also led him to produce a new color wheel and publish four books about teaching colors.

== Personal life ==
In 1860, Bradley married Vilona Eaton. They had no children. She died in 1867. In 1869, he married his second wife, Ellen "Nellie" Thayer. Bradley and Nellie had two daughters.

Milton Bradley died on May 30, 1911, in Springfield, Massachusetts, at age 74. He was buried in Springfield Cemetery in a family plot alongside his father Lewis (1810–1890), his mother Fanny (1813–1872), and his first wife Vilona. His second wife Nellie was buried there after her death in 1918.

In 2004, he was posthumously inducted into the Toy Industry Hall of Fame along with George Ditomassi of Milton Bradley Company.

In 2006, Bradley was posthumously inducted into the National Inventors Hall of Fame.

== Books and patents ==
=== Books ===
- Color in the Schoolroom (1890)
- Color in the Kindergarten (1893)
- Elementary Color (1895)
- Water Colors in the Schoolroom (1900)
- Bradley published a set of rules to play croquet in 1866 written by an author using the pseudonym Prof. A Rover.

=== Patents and inventions ===
- A US patent 53561 A, Milton Bradley, "Social game", published April 3, 1866
- A US patent 416437 A, Milton Bradley, "Drawing Board", published December 3, 1889
- A US patent 537887 A, Milton Bradley, "Color-mixing top", published April 23, 1895
- A US patent 310873 A, Milton Bradley, "Toy spring-gun", published January 20, 1885
- A US patent 492604 A, Milton Bradley, "Color-disk rotating mechanism", published February 28, 1893
- A US patent 524160 A, Milton Bradley, "Compasses", published August 7, 1894
- A US patent 215205 A, Milton Bradley, "Improvement in paper-cutting machines", published May 13, 1879
- A US patent 225457 A, Milton Bradley, "Process of engraving printing-surfaces", published March 16, 1880
- A US patent 418437 A, Milton Bradley, "Kindergarten-table", published December 31, 1889
- Invented the Myriopticon panorama viewer depicting scenes in the American Civil War.

== In popular culture ==
The story of Milton Bradley and The Checkered Game of Life is featured as one of the segments in Season 3, Episode 6 of the Comedy Central show Drunk History.

== See also ==
- George Swinnerton Parker, founder of the Parker Brothers company
