= AAA =

AAA, Aaa, Triple A, or similar may refer to:

== Arts, media, and entertainment ==
=== Video games ===
- AAA (video game industry), a high-budget video game
- AAA Games Studio, a subsidiary of Japanese company Koei Tecmo
- TripleA, a 2001 open source video game

=== Film and television ===
- AAA, la película: sin límite en el tiempo, a 2010 Mexican movie
- Anbanavan Asaradhavan Adangadhavan, a 2017 Indian Tamil-language movie
- Associated Argentine Artists (Spanish: Artistas Argentinos Asociados), an Argentine movie distribution company
- Spearhead from Space, a 1970 Doctor Who serial (production code "AAA")

=== Music ===
==== Groups and labels ====
- AAA (band), Triple A, or Attack All Around, a Japanese pop band
- The AAA Girls or The American Apparel Ad Girls, a drag queen trio
- Against All Authority (-AAA-), an American ska-punk band
- Acid Angel from Asia (AAA), the first sub-unit of K-pop girl group TripleS
- American Accordionists' Association

==== Works ====
- A.A.A (EP), by Nigerian band A.A.A
- AAA (Lee Hwi-min album), 2022
- AAA (Hyukoh and Sunset Rollercoaster album), 2024
- Access All Areas (EP), by The AAA Girls, 2017
- Access All Areas (Flo album), 2024, including a song titled "AAA"
- "AAA", a song on City (Strapping Young Lad album), 1997
- "Aaa", a song by They Might Be Giants on their 2015 album Glean
- Greek: "ΑΑΑ (ΑΑΑ) και χωρίσαμε", romanized: AAA (AAA) kai korisame, lit. 'AAA (AAA) and we broke up', a song on Kravgi by Anna Vissi, 2000

==== Other uses in music ====
- Adult Alternative Airplay, Triple A, or formerly, Adult Alternative Songs, a record chart published by Billboard
- Adult album alternative, a radio format
- AAA song form (AKA strophic form, verse-repeating form, chorus form, or one-part song form)

=== Other uses in performing arts ===
- "Access all areas", a form of backstage pass
- Association of Amateur Artists, a theatre association in Peru
- Asia Artist Awards, the South Korean annual award ceremony hosted by Star News
- 98.9 FM (Brisbane), also known as Triple A Murri Country, an Australian community radio station

=== Graphic arts ===
- <A.A.A> (Aces of ANSI Art), digital art group (1989–1991)
- Associated American Artists, an art gallery
- Allied Artists Association (founded 1908), an art exhibiting society in London
- American Abstract Artists (founded 1937)
- Asia Art Archive, Hong Kong
- Archives of American Art, a research center within the Smithsonian Institution

=== Other uses in arts, media, and entertainment ===
- AAA, a Japanese manga by Haruka Fukushima
- AAA, triplet rhyme scheme

== Ethnic/cultural affinity groups ==
- Afro-American Association
- American Australian Association, a privately-funded nonprofit organization based in New York
- Amhara Association of America
- Australian American Association, a community organization based in Australia

== Government and business ==
=== Government agencies ===
- Agricultural Adjustment Administration, a 1933–1942 U.S. government agency
- Puerto Rico Aqueduct and Sewer Authority (Spanish: Autoridad de Acueductos y Alcantarillados de Puerto Rico)
- Ainmean-Àite na h-Alba, the national advisory partnership for Scottish Gaelic place names in Scotland

=== Legislation ===
- Agricultural Adjustment Act of 1933, US
- Agricultural Adjustment Act of 1938, US

=== Political organizations ===
- Alianza Americana Anticomunista ("American Anticommunist Alliance" in Spanish), a Colombian para-military organization, 1978–1979
- Alianza Apostólica Anticomunista, in Spain
- Anti-Austerity Alliance, a political party in Ireland
- Argentine Anticommunist Alliance, a mid-1970s death squad

=== Business and law ===
- AAA, the best bond credit rating
- American Academy of Actuaries
- American Accounting Association
- American Arbitration Association

== Science and technology ==
=== Biology, medicine, and chemistry ===
==== Amines ====
- AAA, a codon for the amino acid lysine
- Amino acid analysis
- Aromatic amino acids
- Arylalkanolamine

==== Medical organizations ====
- American Association for Anatomy, professional organization advancing anatomical sciences research and education
- Advanced Accelerator Applications, a radiopharmaceutical company

==== Neuroscience and immunology ====
- Triple-A syndrome, whose symptoms include achalasia, addisonianism, and alacrima
- Anti-amyloid drugs, also known as anti-amyloid antibodies
- Anti-actin antibodies

==== Other chemistry and biochemistry ====
- Amalgam (chemistry), represented in medieval alchemical texts with "aaa"
- Asymmetric allylic alkylation
- α-Aminoadipate pathway, for the synthesis of the amino acid L-lysine
- AAA proteins (ATPases Associated with various cellular Activities)

==== Other uses in biology, medicine, and chemistry ====
- Abdominal aortic aneurysm
- Acral acanthotic anomaly
- In the initialism OPQRST-AAA, aggravating/alleviating factors, associated symptoms, and attributions/adaptations
- Cavaticovelia aaa (aaa water treader), an insect from Hawaii, named after ʻaʻaʻā, the Hawaiian word for "lava tube"
- List of banana cultivars § AAA Group, triploid Musa acuminata

=== Computing ===
- AAA, a level in the Web Content Accessibility Guidelines (WCAG)
- Advanced Amiga Architecture chipset
- Authentication, authorization, and accounting, a security framework
- ASCII adjust after addition, one of the Intel BCD opcodes for working with binary-coded decimal on x86
- .aaa, the American Automobile Association's top-level Internet domain

=== Other uses in science and technology ===
- AAA battery, a standard size of dry cell battery
- Angle-angle-angle, a method for identifying similar triangles in geometry
- Area activity analysis, a quality tool for process management
- American Anthropological Association
- Australian Archaeological Association
- Airdrie Astronomical Association, an astronomy club and registered charity in North Lanarkshire, Scotland

== Sports ==
=== Groupings and organizations ===
- Lucha Libre AAA Worldwide, a Mexican wrestling promotion
- Asian Athletics Association, the continental athletics authority in Asia
- Amateur Athletic Association of England, the Athletic Association in England
- Arkansas Activities Association, for high school sports
- Montreal AAA, an amateur athletic association
- Triple-A (baseball), a North American Minor League Baseball classification level
- Senior ice hockey § Senior AAA hockey leagues

=== Other uses in sports ===
- American Airlines Arena, the 1999–2021 name of the Kaseya Center, a multi-purpose arena in Miami, Florida
- Chirk AAA F.C., a Welsh football team

== Transportation ==
=== Automotive ===
- American Automobile Association (AAA), aka Triple A
- Australian Automobile Association
- AG für Akkumulatoren- und Automobilbau, German automobile manufacturer
- Ateliers d'Automobiles et d'Aviation, a French automobile manufacturer
- American Ambulance Association
- AAA Cooper Transportation, an American less-than-truckload freight carrier

=== Aviation ===
- Anti-aircraft artillery, measures to combat enemy aerial forces
- Antique Airplane Association, an organization in the US
- ASL Airlines Australia, an airline
- Ansett Australia, a former airline (ICAO code: AAA)
- Logan County Airport (Illinois), US (FAA code: AAA)
- Anaa Airport, Tukuhora, French Polynesia (IATA code: AAA)

=== Other uses in transportation ===
- Association of Autonomous Astronauts
- All ages and abilities bikeway network — see cycling in Halifax, Nova Scotia

== Other uses ==
- Ghotuo language (ISO 639-3 code: AAA)
- Adopt-An-Alleyway Youth Empowerment Project, San Francisco, California
- AAA or 3A, the middle level of the Tourist Attraction Rating Categories of China
- Association of Air Ambulance, a UK organization supporting air medical services

== Further disambiguation ==
=== People ===
- Abu Abd-Allah (disambiguation)
- Ahmed Al Ahmed (disambiguation)
- Ahmed Al-Assiri (disambiguation)
- Andrew, Archbishop of Antivari (disambiguation)
- Aye Aye Aung (disambiguation)

=== Other uses in further disambiguation ===
- Academy of Applied Arts (disambiguation)
- Access All Areas (disambiguation)
- Addis Ababa Agreement (disambiguation)
- Again and Again (disambiguation)
- Ah Ah Ah (disambiguation)
- All About Adam (disambiguation)
- All American Airways (disambiguation)
- Ansel Adams Award (disambiguation)
- Army Appropriations Act (disambiguation)
- Axis and Allies (disambiguation)
- Ay Ay Ay (disambiguation)

== See also ==
- 3A (disambiguation)
- A3 (disambiguation)
- AA (disambiguation)
- AAAA (disambiguation)
- Aaahh!!! Real Monsters
- American Academy of Arts and Sciences (AAA&S)
- The Frank Zappa aaa•fnr•aaa Birthday Bundle, a 2008 digital download; AAAFNRAAA stands for "Anything Anytime Anywhere for No Reason At All, Again"
