= Axis & Allies (disambiguation) =

Axis & Allies is a franchise series of World War II strategy board games.

Axis & Allies or Axis and Allies may also refer to:

- Axis & Allies Miniatures
- Axis & Allies: Pacific
- Axis & Allies: Pacific 1940
- Axis & Allies: Europe
- Axis & Allies: Europe 1940
- Axis & Allies: D-Day
- Axis & Allies: Guadalcanal
- Axis & Allies: Battle of the Bulge
- Axis & Allies (1998 video game)
- Axis & Allies (2004 video game)

== See also ==
- Category:Axis & Allies
- Axis powers of World War II
- Allies of World War II
- Allies of World War I
- Central Powers of World War I
