= 2013 in games =

This page lists board and card games, wargames, miniatures games, and tabletop role-playing games published in 2013. For video games, see 2013 in video gaming.

== Games released or invented in 2013 ==
- Android: Netrunner - A Study in Static
- Android: Netrunner - Cyber Exodus
- Android: Netrunner - Trace Amount
- Axis & Allies: World War I 1914
- Card Hunter
- Caverna
- Clumsy Thief
- Concept
- The Duke
- Evolution: Random Mutations
- Forbidden Desert
- Freedom: The Underground Railroad
- Kantai Collection
- The Lord of the Rings Dice Building Game
- My Little Pony Collectible Card Game
- Russian Railroads
- Star Trek: Attack Wing
- Superfight
- Theros
- Village: Inn

== Game awards given in 2013 ==
- Spiel des Jahres: Hanabi
- Kennerspiel des Jahres: Legends of Andor
- Kinderspiel des Jahres: Der verzauberte Turm
- Deutscher Spiele Preis: Terra Mystica
- Games: Trajan

== Deaths ==
Date	Name	Age	Notability
January 18	Lynn Willis	??	co-designer of the Basic Role-Playing system
February 25	Allan B. Calhamer	81	designer of Diplomacy
March 24	Todd Breitenstein	47	designer of Zombies!!!, co-founder of Twilight Creations, Inc.
April 20	Quinton Hoover	49	illustrator, known for work on Magic: The Gathering and Dungeons & Dragons, amongst others
July 1	Charles Foley	82	Designer of Twister
September 3	Donald Featherstone	95	Wargame designer and author
December 25	Anthony J. Bryant	52	author

== See also ==
- List of game manufacturers
- 2013 in video gaming
