= Access All Areas =

Access All Areas may refer to:

- Access all areas, the highest tier of backstage pass

== Music ==
- Access All Areas (Spyro Gyra album), 1984
- Access All Areas (Eric Burdon & Brian Auger Band album), 1993
- Access All Areas (Anna Vissi album), 2012
- Access All Areas (EP), 2017 extended play by the AAA Girls
  - Access All Areas Tour
- Access All Areas (Flo album), 2024
  - Access All Areas Tour (Flo), 2025
- Access All Areas (The Stranglers album), 1997
- Access All Areas: Remixed and B-Sides, a 2005 album by Atomic Kitten
- Access All Areas: A Rock & Roll Odyssey, a 1990 documentary following rock band Bon Jovi
- Access All Areas: Live, a 2025 box set by rock band Whitesnake

== Television ==
- "The Simpsons: Access All Areas", a 2010 Simpsons special featuring behind the scenes footage
- Doctor Who Access All Areas, a playlist of behind-the-scenes YouTube videos accompanying series 11 (2018)
- Millie Inbetween: Access All Areas (S1 E13; 2014)

== Other uses ==
- Access All Areas: a user's guide to the art of urban exploration, a 2005 book by Ninjalicious

== See also ==
- Access All Arenas, 2013 album by Justice
- Excess All Areas (disambiguation)
- XS All Areas – The Greatest Hits, 2004 album by Status Quo
- All Areas – Worldwide, 1997 album by Accept
- All Access (disambiguation)
- Access (disambiguation)
- AAA (disambiguation)
