= Axis & Allies: Europe 1940 =

2010 board wargame

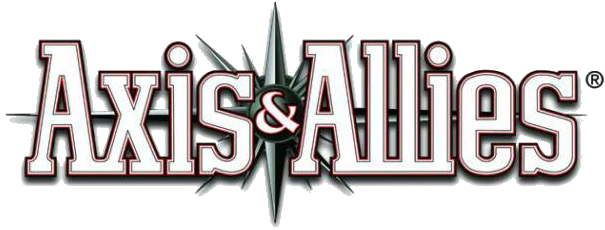
- Designers: Larry Harris
- Publishers: Avalon Hill
- Publication: August 24, 2010
- Players: 2–6
- Setup time: 15 minutes
- Playing time: 2–8 hours
- Chance: medium
- Skills: strategy, logistics
- Website: http://www.wizards.com/default.asp?x=ah/prod/europe1940

Axis & Allies: Europe 1940 is a 2010 board wargame simulating the European Theatre of World War II at the strategic level.

Axis & Allies: Europe 1940 is part of the Axis & Allies family of games and is an update of an earlier game, Axis & Allies: Europe. It was created by Larry Harris and published by Avalon Hill, a division of Wizards of the Coast, which is a subsidiary of Hasbro.

== Gameplay ==
The game board is a map of Europe. Players take turns moving pieces representing military units on the board and engaging in simulated combat. There is also a production system for creating new units.

In Axis & Allies: Europe 1940, players take the role of an Axis power (Germany or Italy) or an Allied power (the United Kingdom, the United States, or the Soviet Union). Vichy France is considered a major power. It is part of the Axis, as the game takes place just after the Battle of France. Once it's conquered by an Allied player, France is considered to be "liberated" and is controlled by the United Kingdom, who represents Free France.

The objective of the Axis players is to capture a certain number of cities from a specified list. The Allied players must capture Berlin and Rome to win the game. Each player also strives to achieve certain national objectives, which are separate for each player.

== New features introduced ==
Features in Axis & Allies: Europe 1940 not seen in earlier Axis & Allies series games include:

- France — for the first time in an Axis & Allies game, France is an independent, major power.
- Declarations of War — unlike previous Axis & Allies games, which begin at a later date when all powers are at full hostilities, two powers — the United States and the Soviet Union — are at peace at the beginning of the game. The Axis powers may declare war on them at any time. The United States may not declare war until the collect–income phase of its third turn. The Soviet Union cannot until the combat move phase of its fourth turn.
- Neutral territories — there are three different types of neutral territories:
  - Pro–Axis Neutrals are considered friendly to Axis powers. Any Axis power may move land units into these territories in its non–combat move phase, which converts the standing armies of that territory into equivalent units of the occupying power. Pro–Axis Neutrals may be attacked by any Allied power without further consequences.
  - Pro–Allied Neutrals follow the same rules as the Pro–Axis neutrals, except only Allied powers may move into and convert them.
  - True Neutrals are not considered friendly to anyone. If any power attacks a True Neutral, every other True Neutral becomes friendly to the other side. For example, if the UK attacks the True Neutral Sweden, every other True Neutral becomes a Pro–Axis Neutral.
- New Units — two new units are introduced to the Axis & Allies series: the tactical bomber, an air unit which is smaller and more maneuverable than the standard bomber and is designed to cooperate with land units, and mechanized infantry, which has the combat abilities of infantry and the movement abilities of armor.
- Facilities — the industrial complex is divided into major and minor complexes, with varying construction costs, requirements, and unit deployment capabilities. Air bases and naval bases are present in the game, enhancing the abilities of air and sea units.
- Repairs — battleships and aircraft carriers, which can now endure two hits, are not immediately repaired at the end of a battle. Instead, they must be taken to a sea zone adjacent to a naval base, where they are repaired at the start of the player's next turn.

== Global game ==
Axis & Allies: Europe 1940 may be combined with Axis & Allies: Pacific 1940, with some changes in the setup, rules, starting income, and national objectives, to form a single game with a game board roughly 180 centimetres (5.9 ft) by 80 centimetres (2.6 ft) in area.

== See also ==
- Victory! The Battle for Europe
