= Bulge =

Bulge may refer to:

== Astronomy and geography ==
- Bulge (astronomy), a tightly packed group of stars at the center of a spiral galaxy
- Equatorial bulge, a bulge around the equator of a planet due to rotation
- Tharsis bulge, vast volcanic plateau centered near the equator in Mars’ western hemisphere
- Tidal bulge, a bulge of land or water on a planet created by the pull of another object in orbit

== Military ==
- Bulge, a discontinuity in an extended military front line
  - Battle of the Bulge, a major World War II German offensive on the Western front starting in 1944
  - Bulge (game), a 1980 board wargame that simulates the Battle of the Bulge
- Anti-torpedo bulge, passive warship defence against naval torpedoes between World War I and World War II

== People ==
- Helge "Bulge" Bostrom (1894–1977), Canadian professional ice hockey player

== Other ==
- Beta bulge, a localized disruption of the regular hydrogen bonding of a beta sheet
- British and Commonwealth English term for the fleshy mass on the back of a camel containing its fat reservoir
- Bulge bracket, the world's largest and most profitable multi-national investment banks
- Earth bulge, a term used in telecommunications
- Power bulge, raised part (a bulge) of the hood (bonnet) of a car
- The Bulge, a mountain located in Coos County, New Hampshire

== See also ==
- Battle of the Bulge (disambiguation)
- Crotch, in men sometimes referred to as a bulge
- Forebulge
- Hernia, sometimes referred to as a bulge or bulge out
- South Sister Bulge the oldest and most eroded of the Three Sisters (Oregon), known as "Faith"
