= Mike Selinker =

American game designer and puzzle maker

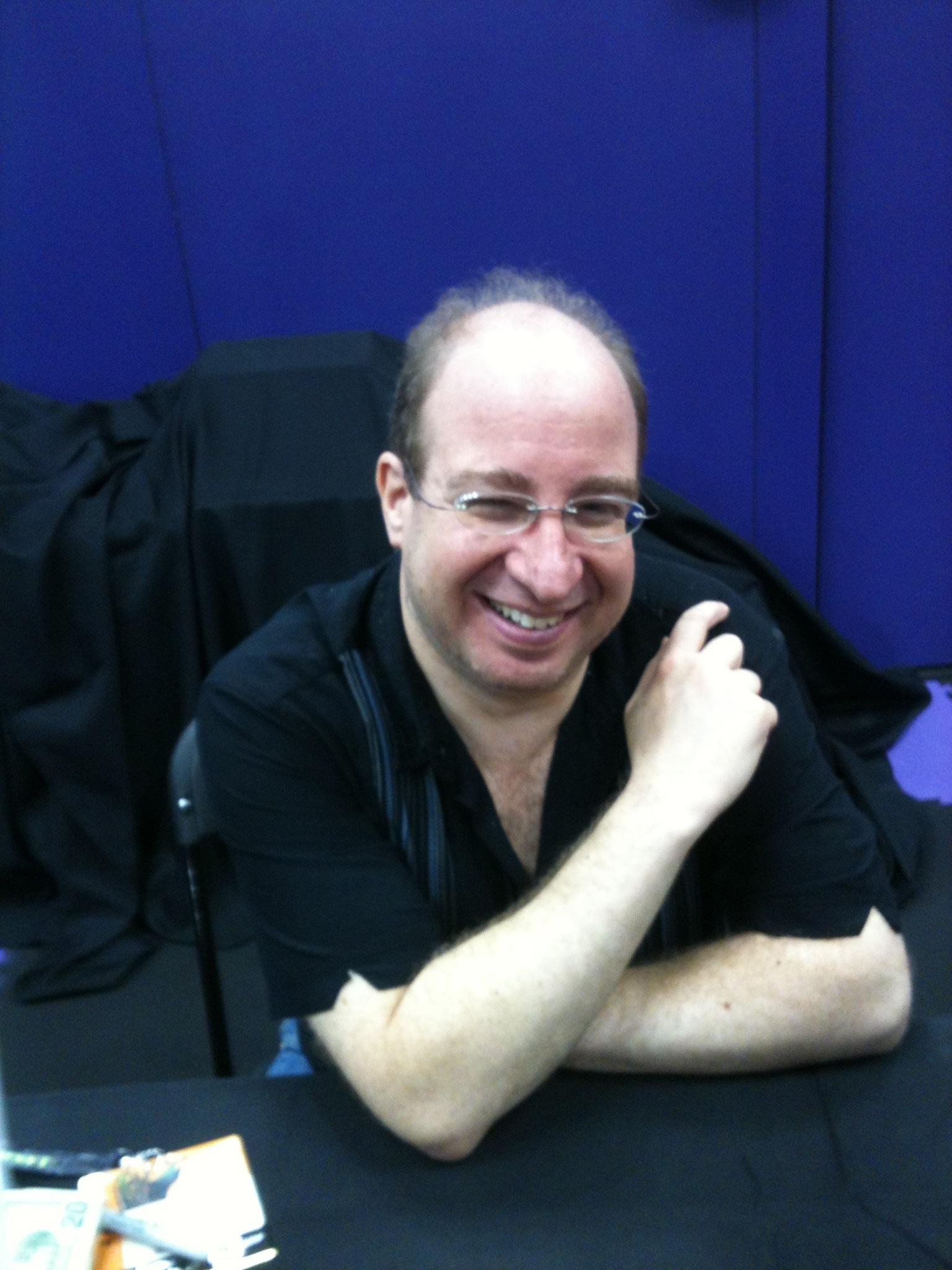
- Selinker in 2014
- Occupation: Game designer

Mike Selinker (/ˈsɛlɪŋkər/ SEL-ink-ər) is an American game designer, puzzle maker, and the founder and president of Lone Shark Games.

== Credits ==
Selinker's design credits include Pirates of the Spanish Main and Fightball with James Ernest, Axis & Allies Revised Edition with Larry Harris, the Marvel Super Heroes Adventure Game, Risk Godstorm, Gloria Mundi, Key Largo, Stonehenge, Thornwatch, and Pathfinder Adventure Card Game. He was a creative director for the 3rd edition of Dungeons & Dragons and the Harry Potter Trading Card Game. As a puzzle maker, he created the fictional police officer Lt. Nodumbo for GAMES World of Puzzles. Selinker founded LIVE/WIRE with Tim Beach and the Maze of Games with Teeuwynn Woodruff. He has written poker books such as Dealer's Choice: The Complete Handbook of Saturday Night Poker, with James Ernest and Phil Foglio. He has also written puzzles for the Chicago Tribune, the New York Times, and Games magazine. He has authored The Kobold Guide to Board Game Design and Puzzlecraft: The Ultimate Guide on How to Construct Every Kind of Puzzle.

Selinker and James Ernest created Titanic Games with Paizo Publishing in 2005 to add board game publishing to Paizo's already established role-playing game publications.

== Lone Shark Games ==
Selinker founded the Lone Shark Games design studio with James Ernest, and is the company's president. In March 2010, in conjunction with Wired magazine and Universal Pictures, the company announced plans to release a group of "Runners" to go "on the lam", as promotion for the film Repo Men. The Runners were to be hunted by anyone in the United States who desired to find them. Anyone that caught a Runner would receive a US$7,500 "bounty". Of the contest, Selinker said, "Our Runners are out there hiding among 300 million people. Of course, that's 300 million people who might turn them in ..."

After a longtime employee accused Selinker of creating an abusive and toxic work environment, he took an unpaid leave of absence from Lone Shark in November 2021.

== Awards ==
Selinker won three 2004 Origins Awards for Pirates, Axis & Allies: D-Day, and Betrayal at House on the Hill. His game Alpha Blitz was Games Magazine's 1998 Word Game of the Year.

== Personal life ==
Selinker is a member of the National Puzzlers' League under the nickname "Slik".
