= Axis & Allies: Pacific 1940 =

2010 board game

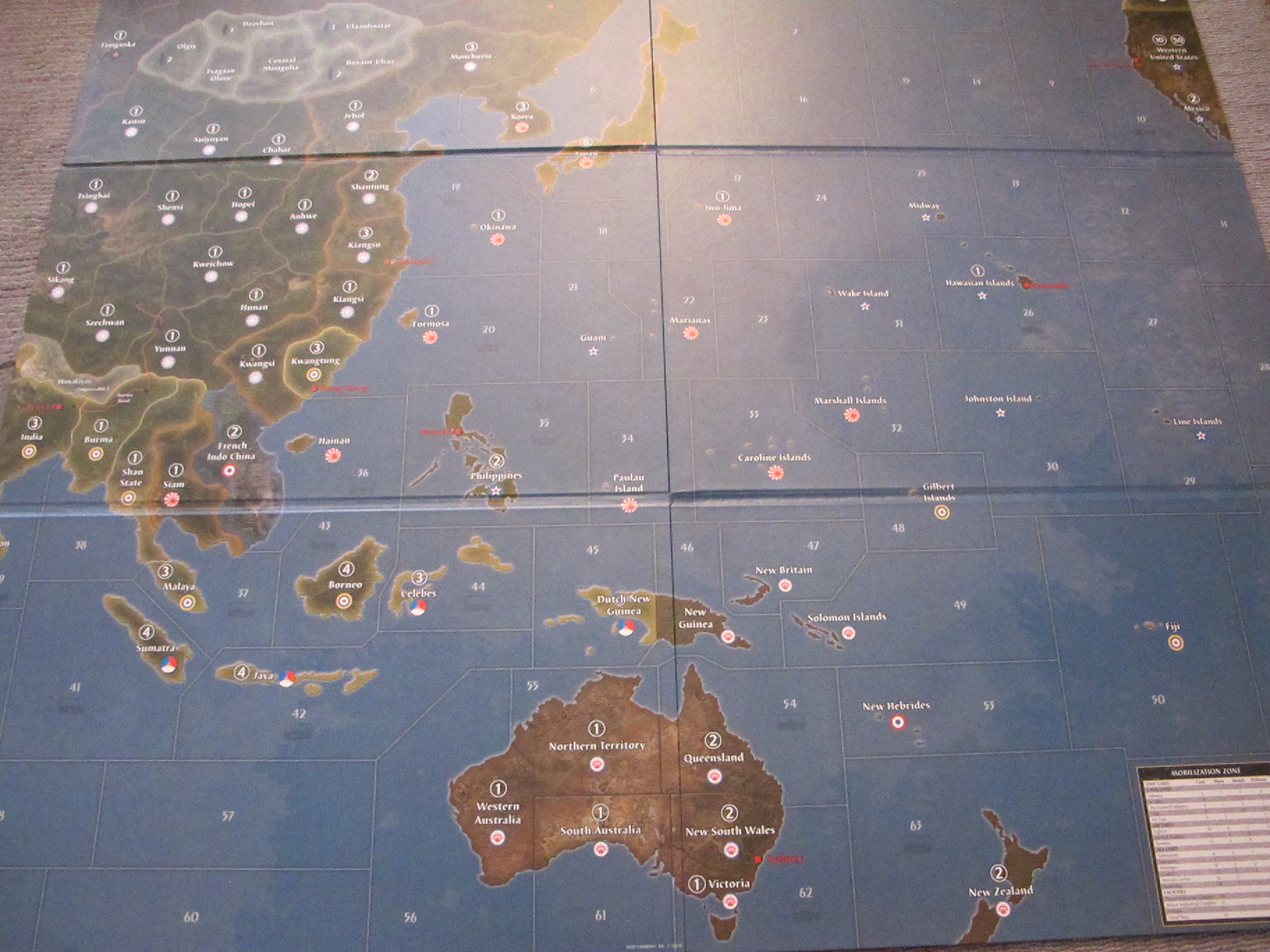
- Designers: Larry Harris
- Publishers: Avalon Hill
- Publication: 2010
- Players: 2–5
- Setup time: 15 minutes
- Playing time: 2–8 hours
- Chance: medium
- Skills: strategy

Axis & Allies: Pacific 1940 is a board game created by Larry Harris and published by Avalon Hill as part of the Axis & Allies family of games. It is considered to be a revision, or "deluxe edition", according to Avalon Hill's press releases, of Harris' earlier game, Axis & Allies: Pacific. Among the major changes from Pacific was the incorporation of newer rules from newer Axis & Allies revisions, as well as features exclusive to this game.

Unlike its predecessor, Axis & Allies: Pacific 1940 may be combined with Axis & Allies: Europe 1940 to form one game, played with the combined board of both games and using the pieces found in both games. The rules for the combined game, said to be the "largest Axis & Allies ever", are only available as part of the Europe 1940 rules.

== Gameplay ==
Gameplay of Pacific 1940 is in the style of the latest edition of Axis & Allies: players take on either Japan, or one of three Allied powers – the United Kingdom, the United States, or ANZAC (Australia and New Zealand) forces. China is considered another major power in Pacific 1940, though they are commanded by one of the other Allied powers, or by all Allied players as a committee. The objective of Japan is to capture six victory cities. The Allied nations must capture Japan to win the game. All powers may also play to achieve a smaller number of "national objectives", which grant one-time or persistent advantages.

The board is designed with combining with Europe 1940 in mind. Pacific 1940 uses only part of the board: for example, there are a number of Soviet Union territories on the board, which are only used in the combined game and considered impassible in Pacific 1940.

Other specific combined game provisions include territories that start the game as French, Dutch, or Canadian, none of which are represented in Pacific 1940 but are present in Europe 1940. The initial setup of the British, American, ANZAC, Chinese, and Japanese forces for Pacific 1940 half of the combined game is also used for Pacific 1940, to consolidate all the setup of the combined game into the Europe 1940 rulebook.

New features in Pacific 1940 to the Axis & Allies series are the following:

- ANZAC forces – In Pacific, the British player controlled separate supplies representing New Zealand and Australian forces. Both produce British units. The Australian and New Zealand forces have been spun off as a new power entirely, using gray versions of British pieces.
- Declarations of War – Unlike previous Axis & Allies games, which take place at a later point in time when full hostilities have begun, only China begins the game with full hostilities against Japan. All Allied powers are provoked into war if Japan attacks any Allied non-Chinese territory, other than the French or Dutch territories, which are considered neutral for Pacific 1940. Individual Allied powers may provoke Japan into war by attacking Japanese forces or stationing forces in China. The American wartime economy is also simulated.
- Neutral territories – Some territories are deemed neutral at the start of the game. They are impassible to units unless one intends to attack them, when the territory joins sides with the force opposing the attackers, though nominally remaining uncontrolled. Some neutral territories contain stationary defenders.
- New Units – Two new units have been introduced to the Axis & Allies series. Tactical bombers are a smaller & more manoeuvrable plane than the standard bomber, and whose attack improves in the presence of friendly tanks or fighters. Mechanized infantry are similar to infantry, but have the movement abilities of a tank.
- Facilities – The industrial complex is divided into major and minor complexes, with varying construction costs, requirements, and unit deployment capabilities. Air bases and naval bases are present in the game, enhancing the abilities of air and sea units. All facilities also act as stationary antiaircraft guns, and all are susceptible to strategic bombing attacks.
- Repairs – Battleships and carriers are not immediately repaired at the end of battle. They must be taken to a sea zone adjacent to a naval base, where they are repaired at the start of the player's next turn. Damaged carriers are unable to carry fighters or tactical bombers. Any allied aircraft on a damaged carrier is unable to defend in combat or move their fighter away.
