= Thin Ice =

Thin Ice may refer to:

== Films ==
- Jesse Stone: Thin Ice, a 2009 American TV crime drama
- Thin Ice (1919 film), an American silent drama
- Thin Ice (1937 film), an American romantic comedy
- Thin Ice (2000 film), a British television thriller
- Thin Ice (2011 film), an American comedic drama
- Thin Ice (2013 film), a climate change documentary

== Television ==
=== Episodes ===
- "Thin Ice" (The Sweeney), 1975
- "Thin Ice", a 1985 episode of MacGyver
- "Thin Ice", a 2001 episode of Even Stevens
- "Thin Ice", a 2007 episode of All Saints
- "Thin Ice" (Doctor Who episode), 2017

=== Series ===
- Thin Ice (2006 TV series), a 2006 British comedy show
- Thin Ice (2020 TV series), a Swedish-Icelandic-French drama series
- Thin Ice (2023 TV series), a Chinese tv series

== Music ==
- "The Thin Ice", a 1979 Pink Floyd song
- "Thin Ice", a song by Little River Band from the 1986 album No Reins
- "Thin Ice", a song by Lenny Kravitz from his 1995 album Circus
- Thin Ice (band), an American hardcore band

== Other uses ==
- Thin Ice, a 1997 memoir by Bruce McCall
- Thin Ice (audio drama), a 2011 Doctor Who drama
- Thin Ice (game), a 1989 board game
- Thin Ice (novel), by Compton Mackenzie, 1956

== See also ==
- ThinIce, an Australian theatre company founded and run by Matthew Lutton from 2002 until 2012
- On thin ice (disambiguation)
