= Axis & Allies =

World War II strategy board game series

World War II Strategy Board Game
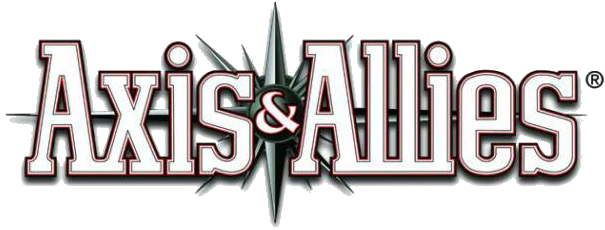

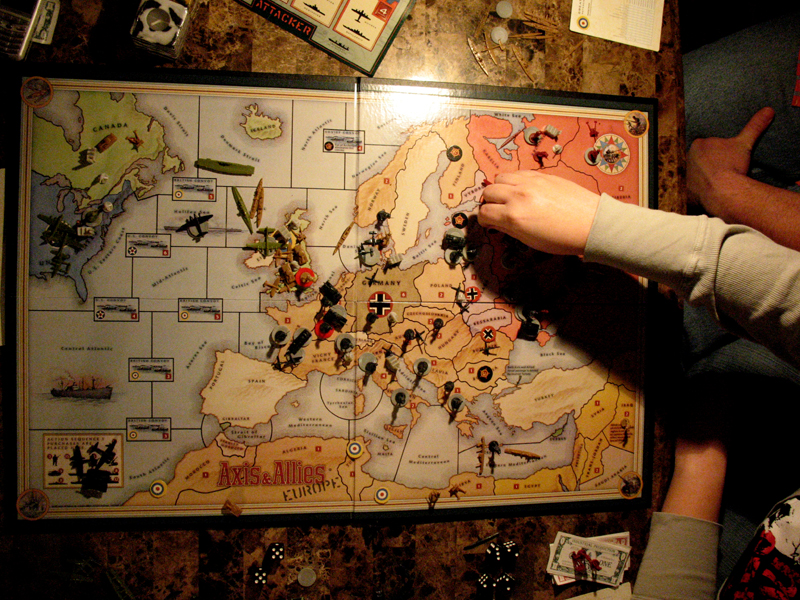
- Axis & Allies: Europe game board
- Other names: Axis and Allies
- Designers: Larry Harris
- Illustrators: Jim Butcher II
- Publishers: Milton Bradley (1984-1999); Avalon Hill (1999-2023); Renegade Game Studios (2023-present)
- Publication: 1981; 45 years ago
- Years active: 1981–present
- Genres: Board game
- Languages: English
- Players: 2–5
- Playing time: 180'
- Chance: Medium
- Age range: 12+
- Skills: Tactics, strategy, economics, teamwork, logistics

Axis & Allies is a series of World War II strategy board games. The first version was published in 1981 and a second edition known colloquially as Axis & Allies: Classic was published in 1984. Played on a board depicting a Spring 1942 political map of Earth divided by territories, players take the role of one or more of the five major belligerents of World War II: the Axis powers of Germany and Japan, and the Allied powers of the Soviet Union, the United Kingdom, and the United States. Turns rotate among these belligerents, who control armies of playing pieces with which they attempt to capture enemy territories, with results determined by dice rolls. The object of the game is to win the war by capturing enough critical territories to gain the advantage over the enemy.

More than ten spinoff games have since been produced. Some of these editions are revised versions of the classic game, while others depict a specific theater, campaign or battle of World War II.

== Game development ==
Axis & Allies was designed by Larry Harris under the prototype name 1942 in the late 1970s. In 1981, Harris partnered with a local Connecticut hobby shop, Citadel Game Store, to publish Axis & Allies under the company name of Nova Game Designs, with the name originating from Pat Flory, the owner of the shop. In 1984, the game was republished by the Milton Bradley Company as part of the Gamemaster Series of board games. This edition has been retroactively named Axis & Allies: Classic to differentiate it from later revisions.

In 1996, Axis & Allies: Classic was inducted into the Academy of Adventure Gaming Arts & Design Adventure Gaming Hall of Fame. Games magazine has inducted Axis & Allies into their buyers' guide Hall of Fame, an honor the magazine extends to "games that have met or exceeded the highest standards of quality and play value and have been continuously in production for at least 10 years; i.e., classics." Axis & Allies: Classic was the most successful of the five Gamemaster Series of board games.

After acquiring Milton Bradley (1984) and Avalon Hill (1998), Hasbro transferred the Axis & Allies: Classic (1984) board game from the Milton Bradley division to the Avalon Hill division in 1999. In 1999, Hasbro acquired Wizards of the Coast. In 2004, Hasbro made Avalon Hill a subsidiary of Wizards of the Coast (WotC). In January 2021, after corporate restructuring, Avalon Hill became a subsidiary of Hasbro Gaming instead.

In 2022, Renegade Games Studios entered a partnership with Hasbro, to publishing future versions of Axis & Allies, among other games, and organize an Axis & Allies world championship, and run an Axis & Allies website, starting in 2023. In 2023 the company released reprints of Axis & Allies: 1914, Axis & Allies 1941, Axis & Allies 1942, Axis & Allies 1940 Europe, Axis & Allies 1940 Pacific, and announced a reprint of Axis & Allies: Guadalcanal, as well as two new, upcoming games: Axis & Allies: North Africa and G.I. Joe: Battle for the Arctic Circle, a board game centered on the G. I. Joe line of action figures, that will use the Axis & Allies game engine.

The mainline Axis & Allies game has gone through several revisions, most recently in 2018, and the game has several spinoffs. The series is currently published by Renegade Game Studios through a licensing agreement with Hasbro. There are 15 board games in the Axis & Allies series, not counting second editions, 5 of which are currently supported by Renegade Game Studios. These are Axis & Allies: 1914, Axis & Allies: 1941, Axis & Allies: Europe 1940 2nd Edition, Axis & Allies: Pacific 1940 2nd Edition, and Axis & Allies: Spring 1942 2nd Edition. Many out-of-print A&A board games can be found on auction websites.

== Gameplay ==
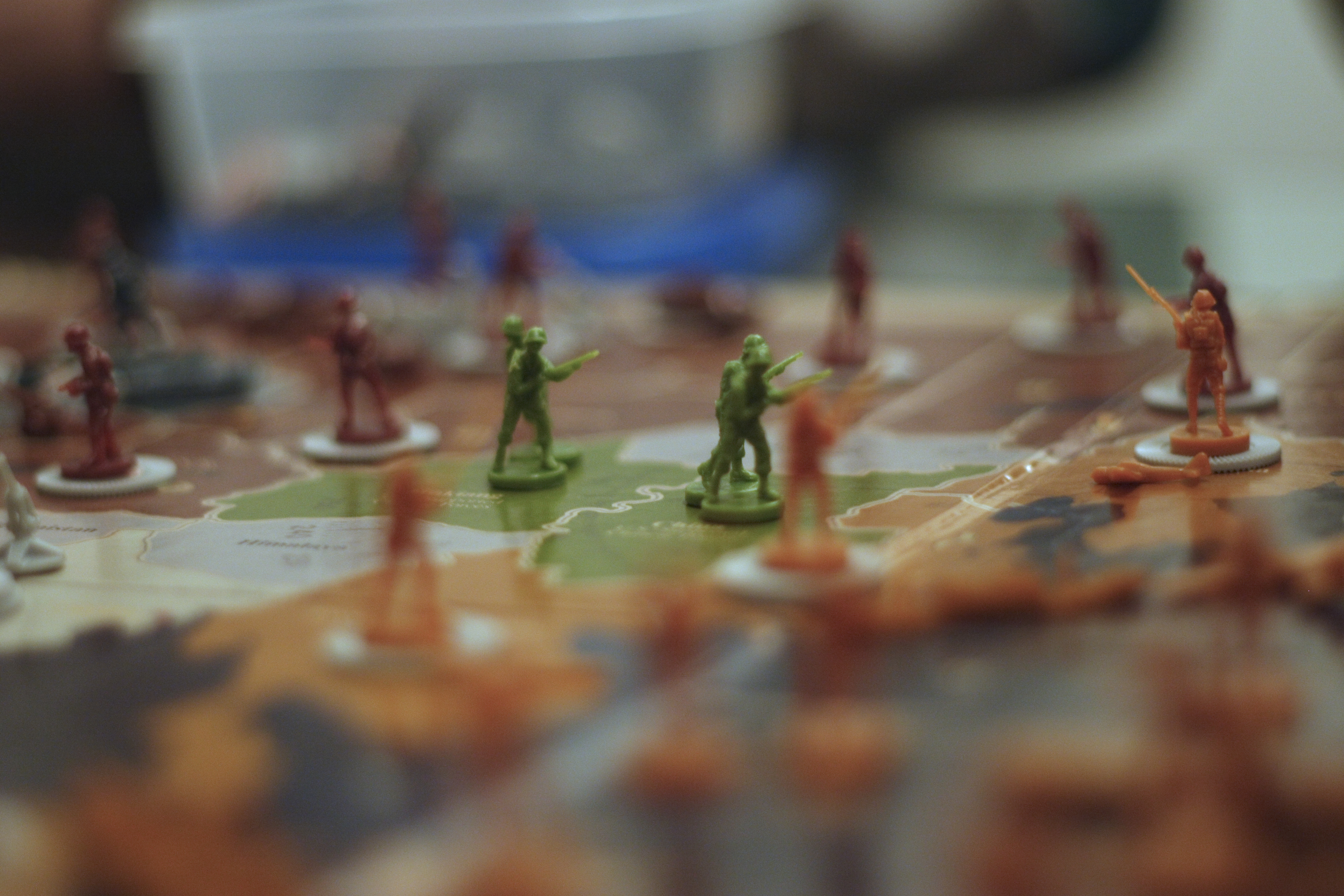
Troops in Asia, in Axis & Allies: Revised 2004

In almost every edition of Axis & Allies, players play as the major belligerents of World War II: Germany, Japan, the Soviet Union, the United Kingdom, and the United States. The A&A: 50th Anniversary Edition includes Italy as the third Axis power and China as the fourth Allied power. The A&A: Pacific 1940 edition includes China and ANZAC (Australia and New Zealand armed forces). The A&A: Europe 1940 edition includes Italy and France.

The players playing the Axis powers team up against those of the Allied powers, usually in an attempt to conquer key territories, represented by regions on the map board. In earlier editions, this was done by capturing and holding until the end of a round of play, certain territories where the opposing alliance's capital cities are located. In later editions, this included other territories on the map, where "victory cities" are located.

Certain versions of Axis & Allies have their own custom victory conditions. In the original Milton Bradley edition, A&A: Classic, the Axis powers could also win by capturing and holding until the end of a round of play enough territories to gain an economic advantage. This "economic victory" was dropped in later editions of A&A.

In Axis & Allies: Pacific, Japan gains a point for every 10 IPCs they collect and can win the game if they collect 22 points. In Axis & Allies: D-Day, the Allies need to control the three cities of Cherbourg, Caen, and Saint-Lo at the end of the 10th round. In Axis & Allies: Guadalcanal, victory is achieved by controlling airfields. In Axis & Allies: Battle of the Bulge, the Germans need to control territories totaling up to 24 points before round 8.

Each round of a game involves each of the powers moving in turn, according to a specified order. The game ends when either the Axis powers or the Allied powers complete their objectives. When each power takes its turn, they must first declare how they are to spend the IPCs (Industrial Production Certificates, an abstract currency representing one million man-hours of labor) in their possession. This may go into buying new units, improving units through research, or repairing damaged structures in later editions. Players then declare any movements made that would result in combat, moving their pieces as appropriate, and after resolving combat, declaring any non-combat movements. At the end of the turn, players place any units that were purchased at the beginning of the turn and collect IPCs based on all territories that they control at the end of their turn.

Combat is typically divided into several types. In all types, combat is divided into rounds. In each round, attackers and defenders roll dice to determine which of their units deal hits on the opposing side. If the number rolled is less than or equal to the unit's attack or defense rating, where appropriate, the unit scores a hit on an opposing unit of the opponent's choosing. During the round if an attacker defeats an enemy, the enemy can do a final retaliation before death, then be taken off the board.

Some types of combat, such as strategic bombing raids, naval bombardment, and anti-aircraft defense, last only one round. In others, the attacker has the option of continuing with another round of battle or retreating. Combat is fully resolved when either side loses all their units, or the attackers choose to retreat. Though combat in different territories may be resolved in any order of the attackers choosing, combat in one territory may affect the number of combatants in another territory for later battles, as in the case of an amphibious assault or when attacking units withdraw.

== Spinoffs ==
Due to the success of Axis & Allies: Classic, as of 2026, there are nineteen (Note: Not including Nova edition which came out before Classic) spin-off games in the A&A franchise. Most use more or less the same mechanics. Four are updated or expanded versions of the original global A&A: Classic game. An additional five games are theater games depicting combat in Europe, Africa, or the Pacific. Four games are local games of specific battles. One game takes place at the beginning of World War One. One features a global theater with the addition of a zombie apocalypse.

Additional games have been published by other game designers with similar mechanics, with some requiring components from an Axis & Allies or similar game.

In 1999, Axis & Allies: Europe was released, with slightly updated rules and a focus on the European theater of World War II. In 2001, Axis & Allies: Pacific was released, with similar rules and a focus shifted to the Pacific theater. In 2004, Axis & Allies: D-Day focused on the Allied liberation of France. In 2004, the first major revision to the core game, Axis & Allies: Revised was released, with elements taken from A&A: Europe and A&A: Pacific, celebrating the 20th anniversary of Axis & Allies.

In 2006, Axis & Allies: Battle of the Bulge focused on the Battle of the Bulge in Europe. In 2007, Axis & Allies: Guadalcanal focused on the Solomon Islands Campaign in the Pacific. In 2008, Axis & Allies: 50th Anniversary Edition was released as one of the three games celebrating the 50th anniversary of its publisher, Avalon Hill. The other two games were Acquire and Diplomacy. In 2009, Axis & Allies: 1942 was the second major revision to the core game, with mechanics taken from the anniversary edition, celebrating the 25th anniversary of Axis & Allies.

In December 2009, Axis & Allies: Pacific 1940 was released. In August 2010, Axis & Allies: Europe 1940 was released. These games can be combined to form a Global game of World War II on a 175×80 cm (70" × 32") map. All nine major powers of World War II, China, France, Germany, Italy, Japan, the Soviet Union, the United Kingdom, the United States and the ANZAC forces, are represented in the combined global game, with unique units and colors. To streamline the game and correct balance issues, Global 1940 was revised and a new rule set was released on the Axis & Allies forums in January 2011, later released as a second edition.

In 2012, Axis & Allies: 1941 was released, containing a simplified map and rules to make it easier for beginners. In 2013, Axis & Allies: 1914 was released, being the only non WWII centered Axis & Allies game. In October 2018, Axis & Allies & Zombies, was released, an ahistorical version.

In August 2024, Axis and Allies: North Africa was released. Axis and Allies: Stalingrad was released one year later in August 2025.

Axis & Allies is not a strictly historical wargame, even without the zombies, due to its streamlining for ease of play and balancing so that both sides have a chance to win. For instance, the economic model is simplistic, with each territory producing a number of Industrial Production Credits (IPCs) for the purchase of new units. For example, in the original Classic version, the game is supposed to start in the spring of 1942, but Japan is immediately in position to attack Hawaii again, while Germany is pressed well into the Soviet Union with an initially superior force. If the game were truer to history, the Axis empires would be at their climax in 1942, about to be pushed back by the Allies.

In June 2026, Operation Market Garden was revealed to be the next spin-off for Axis & Allies.

== Versions ==
| Release | Title | Start | Pieces | Board (inches) | Board (cm) | Type | New units (Note: New units when compared to the original A&A: Classic version of the game.) | Playable powers |
|---|---|---|---|---|---|---|---|---|
| 1981 | Axis & Allies (Nova Games Edition) (Note: This edition was also sold by Australian company Jedko Games with a different cover art) | 1942 | 415 | 37 × 19½ | 93 × 50 | Global | | 5: Germany, Japan, USSR, UK, USA |
| 1984 | Axis & Allies: Classic | 1942 | 299 | 33 × 19½ | 83 × 50 | Global | Infantry, armor (tank), fighter, bomber, battleship, aircraft carrier, submarine, transport, antiaircraft artillery | 5: Germany, Japan, USSR, UK, USA |
| 1999 | Axis & Allies: Europe | 1941 | 373 | 30 × 20 | 75 × 50 | Theater | Destroyer, artillery | 4: Germany, USSR, UK, USA |
| 2001 | Axis & Allies: Pacific | 1941 | 335 | 30 × 20 | 75 × 50 | Theater | Destroyer, artillery, marines | 4: China, (Note: China is a separate power with limited production capabilities that is played by the United States player with light green infantry units.) Japan, UK, (Note: Australia and India are distinct powers that are both played by the UK player.) USA |
| 2004 | Axis & Allies: D-Day | 1944 | 241 | 30 × 20 | 75 × 50 | Local | Artillery, blockhouse | 3: Germany, UK, USA |
| 2004 | Axis & Allies: Revised (A&A 20th Anniversary Edition) | 1942 | 366 | 33 × 20 | 83 × 50 | Global | Destroyer, artillery | 5: Germany, Japan, USSR, UK, USA |
| 2006 | Axis & Allies: Battle of the Bulge | 1944 | 157 | 30 × 20 | 75 × 50 | Local | Artillery, truck | 3: Germany, UK, USA |
| 2007 | Axis & Allies: Guadalcanal | 1942 | 172 | 30 × 20 | 75 × 50 | Local | Destroyer, cruiser, artillery | 2: Japan, USA |
| 2008 | Axis & Allies: 50th Anniversary Edition (Avalon Hill 50th Anniversary) | 1941/42 | 672 | 46 × 24 | 115 × 60 | Global | Destroyer, cruiser, artillery | 7: China, Germany, Italy, (Note: Italy appears for the first time in the A&A board game series as a separate power with brown units.) Japan, USSR, UK, USA |
| 2009 | Axis & Allies: Spring 1942 (A&A 25th Anniversary Edition) | 1942 | 370 | 33 × 20 | 83 × 50 | Global | Destroyer, cruiser, artillery | 5: Germany, Japan, USSR, UK, USA |
| 2009 | Axis & Allies: Pacific 1940 | 1940 | 455 | 35 × 32 | 89 × 81 | Theater | Destroyer, cruiser, artillery, mechanized infantry, tactical bomber, air base, naval base | 6: Australian and New Zealand Army Corps (Australia and New Zealand), (Note: Australia and New Zealand armed forces can be played as a separate power or are played by the UK player with dark tan units.) China, (Note: China can be played as a separate power, or are played by the United States player with light green units. China has limited production)Japan, UK, USA |
| 2010 | Axis & Allies: Europe 1940 | 1940 | 550 | 35 × 32 | 89 × 81 | Theater | Destroyer, cruiser, artillery, mechanized infantry, tactical bomber, air base, naval base | 6: France, (Note: France appears for the first time in the A&A board game series as a separate power with blue infantry units.) Germany, Italy, USSR, UK, USA |
| — | Axis & Allies: Global 1940 (Note: Playable by combining A&A: Pacific 1940 and A&A: Europe 1940.) | 1940 | 1005 | 70 × 32 | 178 × 81 | Global | Destroyer, cruiser, artillery, mechanized infantry, tactical bomber, air base, naval base | 10: Australian and New Zealand Army Corps (Australia and New Zealand), China, France, Germany, Italy, Japan,USSR, UK, USA |
| 2012 | Axis & Allies: 1941 | 1941 | 160 | 32.5 × 17.5 | 83 × 44 | Global | Destroyer | 5: Germany, Japan, USSR, UK, USA |
| 2012 | Axis & Allies: 1942 (Second Edition) | 1942 | 410 | 40 × 26 | 102 × 66 | Global | Destroyer, cruiser, artillery | 5: Germany, Japan, USSR, UK, USA |
| 2012 | Axis & Allies: Pacific 1940 (Second Edition) | 1940 | 500 | 35 × 32 | 89 × 81 | Theater | Destroyer, cruiser, artillery, mechanized infantry, tactical bomber, air base, naval base | 6: Australian and New Zealand Army Corps (Australia and New Zealand), China, Japan, UK, USA |
| 2012 | Axis & Allies: Europe 1940 (Second Edition) | 1940 | 610 | 35 × 32 | 89 × 81 | Theater | Destroyer, cruiser, artillery, mechanized infantry, tactical bomber, air base, naval base | 6: France, Germany, Italy, USSR, UK, USA |
| — | Axis & Allies: Global 1940 (Second Edition) (Note: Playable by combining A&A: Pacific 1940 (Second Edition) and A&A: Europe 1940 (Second Edition).) | 1940 | 1110 | 70 × 32 | 178 × 81 | Global | Destroyer, cruiser, artillery, mechanized infantry, tactical bomber, air base, naval base | 10: Australian and New Zealand Army Corps (Australia and New Zealand), China, France, Germany, Italy, Japan,USSR, UK, USA |
| 2013 | Axis & Allies: World War I 1914 | 1914 | 400 | 32.5 x 32.25 | 82.6 x 81.9 | Global | Cruiser, artillery, naval base | 8: Austro-Hungarian Empire, British Empire, French Third Republic, Imperial Germany, Italy, Ottoman Empire, Imperial Russia, USA |
| 2018 | Axis & Allies & Zombies | 1941 | 215 | 34 x 17.5 | 85 x 44 | Global | Artillery, Destroyer, Zombie | 5: USSR, Germany, UK, Japan, USA |
| 2024 | Axis & Allies: North Africa | 1941-1942 | 250 | 50 x 20 | 40 x 26 | Theater | Mechanized infantry, artillery, anti-aircraft artillery, anti-tank gun, scout car, truck, Matilda II tank, lend-lease Sherman tank, land mine, sea mine | 4: Germany, Italy, UK, USA |
| 2024 | Axis & Allies: Anniversary Edition (Second Edition) | 1941/42 | 672 | 46 × 24 | 115 × 60 | Global | Destroyer, cruiser, artillery | 7: China, Germany, Italy, Japan, USSR, UK, USA |
| 2025 | Axis & Allies: Stalingrad | 1942 | 150 | 26" x 20" | 66" x 50" | Local | Sniper, Assault Gun, Rocket Launcher | 2: Soviet Union, Germany |

== Units ==
Unit comparison: Five Global Editions
| Unit name | Edition | IPC cost | ATK | DEF | MOV | Notes |
|---|---|---|---|---|---|---|
| Infantry | Classic | 3 | 1/2* | 2 | 1 | |
| Infantry | Revised | 3 | 1/2* | 2 | 1 | *Infantry attack increases to 2 when paired with artillery. |
| Infantry | 50th Anniv. | 3 | 1/2* | 2 | 1 | *Infantry attack increases to 2 when paired with artillery. |
| Infantry | 1942 2nd | 3 | 1/2* | 2 | 1 | *Infantry attack increases to 2 when paired with artillery. |
| Infantry | 1940 2nd | 3 | 1/2* | 2 | 1 | *Infantry attack increases to 2 when paired with artillery. |
| Mechanized infantry | Classic | n/a | n/a | n/a | n/a | |
| Mechanized infantry | Revised | n/a | n/a | n/a | n/a | |
| Mechanized infantry | 50th Anniv. | n/a | n/a | n/a | n/a | |
| Mechanized infantry | 1942 2nd | n/a | n/a | n/a | n/a | |
| Mechanized infantry | 1940 2nd | 4 | 1/2* | 2 | 2 | *Mechanized infantry attack increases to 2 when paired with artillery. Mechanized infantry can blitz when paired with tanks. |
| Artillery | Classic | n/a | n/a | n/a | n/a | |
| Artillery | Revised | 4 | 2 | 2 | 1 | Increases matching infantry roll by one when attacking. |
| Artillery | 50th Anniv. | 4 | 2 | 2 | 1 | Increases matching infantry roll by one when attacking. |
| Artillery | 1942 2nd | 4 | 2 | 2 | 1 | Increases matching infantry roll by one when attacking. |
| Artillery | 1940 2nd | 4 | 2 | 2 | 1 | Increases matching infantry roll by one when attacking. |
| Tank | Classic | 5 | 3 | 2 | 2 | Tanks have the ability to blitz. Was known as "armor" in the original release, but was renamed "tank" for subsequent releases. |
| Tank | Revised | 5 | 3 | 3 | 2 | Tanks have the ability to blitz. Was known as "armor" in the original release, but was renamed "tank" for subsequent releases. |
| Tank | 50th Anniv. | 5 | 3 | 3 | 2 | Tanks have the ability to blitz. Was known as "armor" in the original release, but was renamed "tank" for subsequent releases. |
| Tank | 1942 2nd | 6 | 3 | 3 | 2 | Tanks have the ability to blitz. Was known as "armor" in the original release, but was renamed "tank" for subsequent releases. |
| Tank | 1940 2nd | 6 | 3 | 3 | 2 | Tanks have the ability to blitz. Was known as "armor" in the original release, but was renamed "tank" for subsequent releases. |
| Fighter | Classic | 12 | 3 | 4 | 4 | |
| Fighter | Revised | 10 | 3 | 4 | 4 | |
| Fighter | 50th Anniv. | 10 | 3 | 4 | 4 | |
| Fighter | 1942 2nd | 10 | 3 | 4 | 4 | |
| Fighter | 1940 2nd | 10 | 3 | 4 | 4 | |
| Tactical bomber | Classic | n/a | n/a | n/a | n/a | |
| Tactical bomber | Revised | n/a | n/a | n/a | n/a | |
| Tactical bomber | 50th Anniv. | n/a | n/a | n/a | n/a | |
| Tactical bomber | 1942 2nd | n/a | n/a | n/a | n/a | |
| Tactical bomber | 1940 2nd | 11 | 3/4* | 3 | 4 | *Tactical bomber attack increases to 4 when paired with fighters or tanks. |
| Bomber | Classic | 15 | 4 | 1 | 6 | May make a bombing run against opponent's IPCs. |
| Bomber | Revised | 15 | 4 | 1 | 6 | May make a bombing run against opponent's IPCs. |
| Bomber | 50th Anniv. | 12 | 4 | 1 | 6 | May make a bombing run against opponent's industrial complexes. |
| Bomber | 1942 2nd | 12 | 4 | 1 | 6 | May make a bombing run against opponent's industrial complexes. |
| Bomber | 1940 2nd | 12 | 4 | 1 | 6 | May make bombing runs against opponent's industrial complexes, air bases, and naval bases. Named Strategic Bombers in 1940 |
| Submarine | Classic | 8 | 2 | 2 | 2 | Submarines shoot before other units, which can be eliminated without returning fire. Can withdraw instead of firing after first round of combat. |
| Submarine | Revised | 8 | 2 | 2 | 2 | Same as above, plus can submerge instead of withdraw, and can also move past hostile ships. |
| Submarine | 50th Anniv. | 6 | 2 | 1 | 2 | Submarines shoot before other units, which can be eliminated without returning fire. Can submerge at any time (including before a battle begins), can move past hostile ships but does not block hostile ships. |
| Submarine | 1942 2nd | 6 | 2 | 1 | 2 | Submarines shoot before other units, which can be eliminated without returning fire. Can submerge at any time (including before a battle begins), can move past hostile ships but does not block hostile ships. |
| Submarine | 1940 2nd | 6 | 2 | 1 | 2 | Submarines shoot before other units, which can be eliminated without returning fire. Can submerge at any time (including before a battle begins), can move past hostile ships but does not block hostile ships. |
| Transport | Classic | 8 | 0 | 1 | 2 | Can carry up to 2 infantry, or one of any other land unit. |
| Transport | Revised | 8 | 0 | 1 | 2 | Can carry any one land unit, plus one infantry. |
| Transport | 50th Anniv. | 7 | 0 | 0 | 2 | Uses Revised Edition cargo rules. No longer has combat value, and chosen as a casualty only if there are no other eligible units. |
| Transport | 1942 2nd | 7 | 0 | 0 | 2 | Uses Revised Edition cargo rules. No longer has combat value, and chosen as a casualty only if there are no other eligible units. |
| Transport | 1940 2nd | 7 | 0 | 0 | 2 | Uses Revised Edition cargo rules. No longer has combat value, and chosen as a casualty only if there are no other eligible units. |
| Destroyer | Classic | n/a | n/a | n/a | n/a | |
| Destroyer | Revised | 12 | 3 | 3 | 2 | Negates all special submarine abilities. |
| Destroyer | 50th Anniv. | 8 | 2 | 2 | 2 | Negates all special submarine abilities. |
| Destroyer | 1942 2nd | 8 | 2 | 2 | 2 | Negates all special submarine abilities. |
| Destroyer | 1940 2nd | 8 | 2 | 2 | 2 | Negates all special submarine abilities. |
| Cruiser | Classic | n/a | n/a | n/a | n/a | |
| Cruiser | Revised | n/a | n/a | n/a | n/a | |
| Cruiser | 50th Anniv. | 12 | 3 | 3 | 2 | Can conduct shore bombardment in amphibious invasions |
| Cruiser | 1942 2nd | 12 | 3 | 3 | 2 | Can conduct shore bombardment in amphibious invasions |
| Cruiser | 1940 2nd | 12 | 3 | 3 | 2 | Can conduct shore bombardment in amphibious invasions |
| Aircraft carrier | Classic | 18 | 1 | 3 | 2 | Can carry two fighters. |
| Aircraft carrier | Revised | 16 | 1 | 3 | 2 | Can carry two fighters. |
| Aircraft carrier | 50th Anniv. | 14 | 1 | 2 | 2 | Can carry two fighters. |
| Aircraft carrier | 1942 2nd | 14 | 1 | 2 | 2 | Can carry two fighters. |
| Aircraft carrier | 1940 2nd | 16 | 0 | 2 | 2 | Can carry any combination of two, fighters and tactical bombers. Takes two shots to destroy. |
| Battleship | Classic | 24 | 4 | 4 | 2 | Can conduct shore bombardment during amphibious invasions. |
| Battleship | Revised | 24 | 4 | 4 | 2 | Can conduct shore bombardment during amphibious invasions. Takes two shots to destroy. |
| Battleship | 50th Anniv. | 20 | 4 | 4 | 2 | Can conduct shore bombardment during amphibious invasions. Takes two shots to destroy. |
| Battleship | 1942 2nd | 20 | 4 | 4 | 2 | Can conduct shore bombardment during amphibious invasions. Takes two shots to destroy. |
| Battleship | 1940 2nd | 20 | 4 | 4 | 2 | Can conduct shore bombardment during amphibious invasions. Takes two shots to destroy. |
| Anti-aircraft Gun Anti-aircraft Artillery (AAA) | Classic | 5 | 0 | 1 | 1 | Only one defensive shot for each attacking aircraft before the first round of combat. Fires at any aircraft moving through the territory. Can only move during noncombat, if it has not fired that turn. |
| Anti-aircraft Gun Anti-aircraft Artillery (AAA) | Revised | 5 | 0 | 1 | 1 | Only one defensive shot for each attacking aircraft before the first round of combat. Fires at any aircraft moving through the territory. Can only move during noncombat, if it has not fired that turn. |
| Anti-aircraft Gun Anti-aircraft Artillery (AAA) | 50th Anniv. | 6 | 0 | 1 | 1 | Only one defensive shot for each attacking aircraft before the first round of combat. Fires at any aircraft moving through the territory. Can only move during noncombat, if it has not fired that turn. |
| Anti-aircraft Gun Anti-aircraft Artillery (AAA) | 1942 2nd | 5 | 0 | 1 | 1 | Renamed Antiaircraft Artillery (AAA). Each AAA unit in the territory may fire up to 3 shots, but each attacking air unit may only be fired upon once. In other words, the total number of air defense dice rolled is 3 times the number of AAA units, or the number of attacking air units, whichever is the lesser. |
| Anti-aircraft Gun Anti-aircraft Artillery (AAA) | 1940 2nd | 5 | 0 | 1 | 1 | Renamed Antiaircraft Artillery (AAA). Each AAA unit in the territory may fire up to 3 shots, but each attacking air unit may only be fired upon once. In other words, the total number of air defense dice rolled is 3 times the number of AAA units, or the number of attacking air units, whichever is the lesser. |
| Naval base | Classic | n/a | n/a | n/a | n/a | |
| Naval base | Revised | n/a | n/a | n/a | n/a | |
| Naval base | 50th Anniv. | n/a | n/a | n/a | n/a | |
| Naval base | 1942 2nd | n/a | n/a | n/a | n/a | |
| Naval base | 1940 2nd | 15 | 0 | 1 | 0 | Repairs friendly capital ships in adjacent waters. Increases the movement of any naval units that start movement in adjacent waters by 1. Can be damaged by strategic bombing. Fires a defensive shot when being strategically bombed. |
| Air base | Classic | n/a | n/a | n/a | n/a | |
| Air base | Revised | n/a | n/a | n/a | n/a | |
| Air base | 50th Anniv. | n/a | n/a | n/a | n/a | |
| Air base | 1942 2nd | n/a | n/a | n/a | n/a | |
| Air base | 1940 2nd | 15 | 0 | 1 | 0 | Airbases on islands allow all fighters and tactical bombers to scramble, which defends adjacent sea zones. Increases the movement of any air units that start movement in the territory with the air base by one. Can be damaged by strategic bombing. Fires a defensive shot when being strategically bombed. |
| Industrial complex | Classic | 15 | 0 | 0 | 0 | Original complexes have unlimited production for original owner. |
| Industrial complex | Revised | 15 | 0 | 0 | 0 | All complexes' maximum production limited to the territory value. |
| Industrial complex | 50th Anniv. | 15 | 0 | 0 | 0 | Can be damaged by strategic bombing, reducing the complex's maximum production. |
| Industrial complex | 1942 2nd | 15 | 0 | 0 | 0 | Can be damaged by strategic bombing, reducing the complex's maximum production. |
| Industrial complex | 1940 2nd | n/a | n/a | n/a | n/a | |
| Minor industrial Complex | Classic | n/a | n/a | n/a | n/a | |
| Minor industrial Complex | Revised | n/a | n/a | n/a | n/a | |
| Minor industrial Complex | 50th Anniv. | n/a | n/a | n/a | n/a | |
| Minor industrial Complex | 1942 2nd | n/a | n/a | n/a | n/a | |
| Minor industrial Complex | 1940 2nd | 12 | 0 | 1 | 0 | Produces a maximum of three units per turn, and can only be built on territories that produce two or more IPCs per turn. Can be damaged by strategic bombing, reducing the complex's maximum production. Can be upgraded to a major industrial complex for 20 IPCs. Fires a defensive shot when being strategically bombed. |
| Major industrial Complex | Classic | n/a | n/a | n/a | n/a | |
| Major industrial Complex | Revised | n/a | n/a | n/a | n/a | |
| Major industrial Complex | 50th Anniv. | n/a | n/a | n/a | n/a | |
| Major industrial Complex | 1942 2nd | n/a | n/a | n/a | n/a | |
| Major industrial Complex | 1940 2nd | 30 | 0 | 1 | 0 | Produces a maximum of 10 units a turn, and can only be built on territories that produce three or more IPCs per turn. Can be damaged by strategic bombing, reducing the complex's maximum production. Fires a defensive shot when being strategically bombed. |
| Zombie | & Zombies | N/A | N/A | N/A | N/A | Are only created when an infantry unit is destroyed. Are not part of a playable nation. Have special dice and cards. It can be used in 1942 second edition as an add on with cards. |

== Revisions ==
Revisions followed shortly after the game release, as the rules didn't always produce results which made sense in the context of the historical setting. For example, the abstraction of submarines fighting airplanes, initially had a restriction that the bomber was the only kind that could attack a sub. This was later revised so that all aircraft could attack submarines.

Although not the very first edition, the Milton Bradley release was the first to establish the well known game mechanics. There were three versions of the rules for the Milton Bradley games, though only the first two were included with the game. The third edition rules were exclusive to the 1998 computer video game Axis & Allies by Hasbro, and Axis & Allies: Iron Blitz with minor additional rules released in 1999. The three editions differed by minor details. There is also a newer RTS video game released in 2004, a departure from the original A&A: Classic world map and introducing several tactical battle scenarios.

The first major revision to the rules was designed by Larry Harris and Mike Selinker, who later developed the board game Attack! based on the experiences learned working with Harris. Harris and Slinkier tried to address many of the Milton Bradley version's shortcomings, including removing the Axis economic victory condition and the requirement of capturing enemy capitals in favor of victory cities, which has been used in every revision since. With victory cities, the Axis and Allies start with an equal number of victory cities (specially labeled territories), and strive to capture enough victory cities to gain a majority of them, with the size of the majority being agreed upon by the players prior to the game. This allows players to play shorter or longer games, depending upon the number of victory cities a power must control in order to claim victory.

With each revision, there were balance changes to make gameplay more dynamic. In the Milton Bradley edition, infantry were cheap units that tended to be most useful as defensive cannon fodder, due to their token attack and slightly better defense. This led to many areas of the game board being heavily fortified, bogging game play down to a matter of who could build more infantry faster. To counteract this, the tank, whose defense ability was equal to infantry in the Milton Bradley release, had its defensive capabilities improved in the revised edition, to encourage players to use combined arms. Other balance changes included altering the costs of units, and altering the transport capacity. In the Milton Bradley edition, transports could carry two infantry, or one of any other land unit. Later revisions had transports able to carry one infantry, in addition to one of any other land unit.

The variety of land and sea units was increased by introducing artillery and destroyers from A&A: Europe and A&A: Pacific to A&A: Revised edition. Artillery increased the effectiveness of infantry in attacks. Destroyers limited the usefulness of submarines and acted as a lower-cost substitute for the expensive battleship. Cruisers were introduced in A&A: 50th Anniversary Edition to effectively split the destroyer's many abilities. While destroyers continue to limit the usefulness of submarines, the stronger cruisers now act as lower cost battleships.

The game board was reworked in each revision. The Milton Bradley classic release featured largely vibrant colors. The revised version featured mainly darker tones. The 50th anniversary edition and 1942 edition has a more realistic terrain with only subtle hints of color to denote which power has initial control over a particular territory. The composition of territories was slightly altered. For example, the number of territories between Berlin and Moscow was increased in the revised edition, including adding many Soviet territories of strategic importance.

Strategic bombing was altered over the years. Until the revised edition, strategic bombing caused opposing players to lose the IPCs they had on hand. The 50th anniversary edition changed this so that industrial complexes were damaged instead. Damaged industrial complexes had less capacity to produce units and can be repaired at the cost of IPCs.

Later revisions have also included changes in research (which was generally not a worthwhile investment in the Milton Bradley edition due to its high cost and low probability of success) to have more of an effect, with mixed results, 1942 edition eliminates research altogether. Another feature that was implemented but was later dropped was the revised edition's "National Advantages", which represented tactics and technologies used by a specific power during the war. For example, a British ability allowed the British player to delay their combat movement until the American player's turn once per game, in order to have a coordinated attack.

Later editions had minor cosmetic changes in the playing pieces. In the Milton Bradley version, only the infantry pieces were unique to each power in appearance. Unique units was later expanded to include nearly every unit in later editions. Compared to the generic fighters of the Milton Bradley release, the Supermarine Spitfire was used in later editions to represent British fighters, the Mitsubishi A6M Zero was used to represent Japanese fighters, while two different fighters (the Grumman F4F Wildcat and the Lockheed P-38 Lightning) represented American fighters. The color scheme to associate units with powers was also standardized across all Axis & Allies series games, based on the colors used in A&A: Europe and A&A: Pacific, and is different from those used in the Milton Bradley release.

In 2009, an updated version of Axis & Allies: Pacific was released, titled Axis & Allies: Pacific 1940. The 10th board game in the A&A series, A&AP 1940 introduced the ANZAC forces as a playable power, along with two new unit types, mechanized infantry and tactical bombers.

In 2010, an updated version of Axis & Allies: Europe was released, titled Axis & Allies: Europe 1940. A&AE 1940 introduced France as a playable power. Mechanized infantry and tactical bomber units continue to appear after debuting in A&A Pac40. Italy also appears as a playable power in A&AE 1940 after debuting in A&A 50. In A&AE 1940 and A&AP 1940 aircraft carriers and battleships are capital ships that are damaged with 1 hit and sunk with 2 hits. Damaged CVs & BBs can be repaired by moving the damaged CV or BB to a friendly naval base for repairs. Special rules apply for fighters and tactical bombers if a CV is damaged.

A&AE 1940 is the 11th A&A boardgame in the series. A&AE 1940 and A&AP 1940 are designed to be played as separate games or may be combined into one game to create a 2-6 player global 1940 scenario, complete with separate set up and national objectives. The combined A&AE 1940 and A&AP 1940 maps measure 175x80 cm (70" x 32"). All 9 major powers of World War II are represented with unique unit pieces and their own unique color.

== Board games ==
In addition to designing the board games, Larry Harris designed A&A: Europe and A&A: Pacific, which had the core mechanics of Axis & Allies adapted for a specific theater. This served as the catalyst for the revised edition. Although there were preliminary plans for a variant that allowed players to combine Europe and Pacific together, it had never been published. Larry Harris released two completely new editions, Axis & Allies Pacific 1940, in December 2009, and Axis & Allies Europe 1940, released in Summer 2010, which include a variant that combines both games together.

Other Harris-designed Axis & Allies games were more tactical in nature, and focused on individual battles in specified, small areas. Axis & Allies: D-Day (2004) focused on the Allied liberation of France. Axis & Allies: Battle of the Bulge (2006) focused on the Battle of the Bulge. Axis & Allies: Guadalcanal (2007) focused on the Solomon Islands Campaign. Though these games retained many of the traditional mechanics, some were specific to the particular game.

== Reception ==
In 1985, Warren Spector reviewed the 1984 Milton Bradley version of Axis & Allies in Space Gamer No. 72. Spector commented that "Overall, Axis & Allies is a winner. It's simple to learn, easy to play, requires lots of thought, and has immense replay value (since each country has unique goals, resources, and geography)."

In 1999, in a retrospective review in Issue 4 of Simulacrum, Joe Scoleri noted, "Sometimes seen as the bane of 'serious' wargamers, this design has stood the test of time and the Milton Bradley re-release served to introduce a whole new generation to wargaming. While it won't please the Advanced Third Reich crowd, it is an entertaining game nonetheless."

In August 1996, Axis & Allies was declared the best-selling physical wargame, having eclipsed the 275,000 copies sold by PanzerBlitz, the second-highest seller in the genre. It sold roughly 1 million copies by 1998.

In 2014, in a review of Axis & Allies in Black Gate, M Harold Page said "Its big advantage is that its historical setting can draw in less geeky players. There are, however, rules to learn and master."

== Video games ==
Two video games based on the official board game were released in 1998 and 2004. In 1998, Axis & Allies was released by Hasbro. It features a departure from the original A&A: Classic world map and introduces several tactical battlefield scenarios. In 1999, Axis & Allies: Iron Blitz was released as an updated version, with minor additional rules and features marines, paratroopers, destroyers, and kamikazes. In 2004, Axis & Allies: RTS by TimeGate Studios was released and is primarily based on real-time strategy gameplay. In 2006, Axis & Allies: RTS Collector's Edition was a released as an expanded version. The game became TimeGate's best-selling game.

In 2008, Wizards of the Coast created an online version of Axis & Allies as part of their Gleemax game site. When Gleemax was cancelled, the game found its way to the GameTable Online game site, who programmed the game for Wizards of the Coast. The initial version was based on the 2004 Revised edition. In September 2010, GameTable Online developed a new version based on the Axis & Allies: 1942 set. Game Table Online is no longer available, as it shut down in 2015. Axis and Allies and many different variants can currently be played via the TripleA website.

TripleA is an open source adaptation of Axis & Allies, available for Windows, Mac, and Linux operating systems. It allows users to play single player against an AI, or hot-seat against other friends in the same room. It allows multiplayer on an online lobby, and also over email (PBEM) and network connections. Originally released in 2002, TripleA is now on stable version 2.2 as of year 2020. Version 2.2 is able to play the major versions of Axis & Allies: Classic, Axis & Allies:Revised, Axis & Allies: 50th Anniversary Edition, Axis & Allies: Spring 1942. It also hosts many fan created maps, which have similar rules to Axis & Allies, but use a different setup or a different map or era altogether, for example, historical scenarios like a map based on Napoleon's conquests, Sci-Fi maps and Fantasy maps.

In 2019, Axis & Allies 1942 Online was published by Beamdog. This application is strictly limited to 1942 Second Edition.

== Miniature games ==
In 2005, Axis & Allies Miniatures was released as the series' first foray into miniature gaming. This was followed up by Axis & Allies Naval Miniatures: War at Sea, with Axis & Allies Air Force Miniatures: Angels Twenty being released in October, 2011. There have been several additional A&A Miniatures booster set releases. Currently there are 20 countries represented in A&A Miniatures.
