= All Access =

All Access may refer to:

- "All Access" (CSI: NY), an episode of CSI: NY
- All Access Mzansi, a show on the M-Net network in South Africa
- Paramount+, formerly known as CBS All Access, an over-the-top streaming service operated by the ViacomCBS
- UFC All Access, a reality TV show
- VH1: All Access, a series of TV music specials

== See also ==
- All Access Europe, a 2002 video album by Eminem
- All Access Pass, a comedy TV program
- All Access Pass (video), a music DVD by Hilary Duff
- All Access to All Things, a 2003 DVD by Mudvayne
