= Lionheart (board game) =

Board game

- Designers: Larry Harris
- Publishers: Parker Brothers; Hasbro
- Publication: 1997; 29 years ago
- Genres: Miniature wargame
- Players: 2
- Playing time: 60 minutes
- Age range: 10+

Lionheart is a medieval miniature wargame designed by Larry Harris and published by Parker Brothers in 1997. Similar to chess, players control different ranks of soldiers in battle, but with the success or failure of a move determined by dice roll.

== Gameplay ==
Lionheart is played on a 9 by 10 board, with each army starting in the first two rows on opposite sides. There are different types of soldiers– kings, knights, archers, infantry, heavy infantry, mercenaries, and peasants– which each have different movement and methods of fighting. Gold and silver miniatures of soldiers are slotted into bases to create units, which perform actions together. Players decide the compositions and starting positions of their ten units, although the king must always be included and start in the middle of the back row.

Pieces can move, turn, or attack as an action, and players are allowed two actions. The same action can be performed twice, but a single unit cannot attack twice on the same turn. Movement occurs in the direction a unit is facing, which can be changed using the turn action. Units of soldiers on foot move one square per movement action, while those on horseback can move any distance in a straight line until they are blocked by another unit. If an opponent's unit is in range and faced by a player's soldiers, that player can choose to make an attack.

Attacks are resolved by rolling special six-sided dice, which have three faces with a battle axe, two faces with crossed arrows, and one face that reads "Panic". The number of dice rolled is decided by the number and type of soldiers in the attacking unit. The unit scores a hit for each battle axe rolled, with the exception of archers who hit each time an arrow is rolled. One basic soldier is removed from a unit for every hit, but a knight or a king must be hit twice in the same attack to be removed. If all dice roll Panics, the attacking unit turns around and retreats one space, causing any ally units it runs into to do the same. If a unit retreats into a space off the edge of the board, that unit is eliminated. The king is unaffected by Panics or retreats.

The player who either kills the opposing player's king or eliminates their entire army is the winner.

== Reception ==
Tom Slizewski, writing for InQuest Gamer #33, described the game as "a fun way to spend an hour dice-chucking," praising it for its simple yet interesting rules. In Backstab #8, Croc praised Lionheart for similar reasons, but heavily criticized the look of the game.
