= Ay ay ay ay (disambiguation) =

"Ay ay ay ay" is the refrain of popular Mexican song "Cielito Lindo".

Ay ay ay ay and similar phrases may also refer to:

- "Limerick" (song), a traditional drinking song with a phonetically similar refrain
- "Ay Ay Ay Ay Moosey", a 1981 song by Modern Romance

== See also ==
- Ay Ay Ay (disambiguation)
- Ayayayayay, a 1987 album by Popong Landero and Bagong Lumad
- Aiaiaiaiaiai, a 1987 song by Vopli Vidopliassova
- "Can You Hear Me? (Ayayaya)", a 2012 song by Wiley
