= TripleA =

2001 open source video game

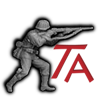

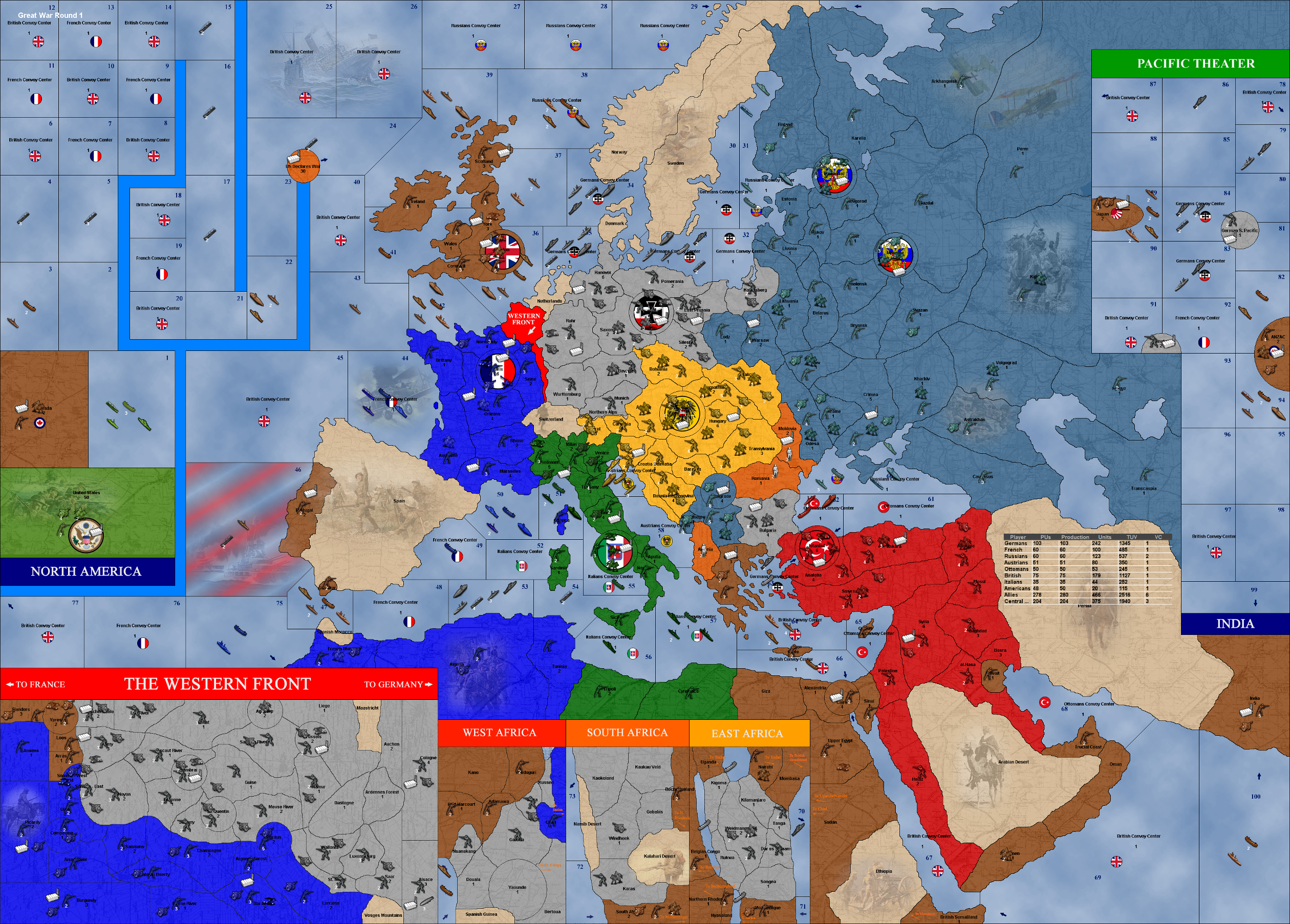
- Screenshot First World War themed TripleA map
- Original author: Sean Bridges
- Developers: Sean Bridges, Chris Duncan (Veqryn), Dan Van Atta, Steven Soloff, Kevin Comcowich (ComradeKev)
- Release: October 1, 2001; 25 years ago
- Stable release: 2.5.22285 / 1 November 2020; 5 years ago
- Written in: Java
- Operating system: Windows, macOS, Linux
- Platform: IA-32, x64; Java SE
- Size: 60 MB (basegame)
- Available in: English
- Type: Turn-based strategy
- License: GPLv3 (before 2018 GPLv2)
- Website: triplea-game.github.io
- Repository: https://github.com/triplea-game/triplea/

TripleA is a free and open-source turn based strategy game based on the Axis & Allies board game.

== Gameplay ==
TripleA features multiplayer and several AIs for single-player mode. For live multiplayer games, the community maintains two lobbies for the most current Stable and Unstable versions. There is also a Play by Email multiplayer mode.

A wide variety of map scenarios have been developed for TripleA (e.g. World War II, Punic Wars and Napoleonic Wars) with a variety of rules, units and many options, such as "low luck" which reduces the number of dice rolled making game depend more on strategy.

== History ==
TripleA is developed in Java and can run on personal computers with Java SE installed. Some TripleA designers also worked on FreeCol, and Open General. Originally set up on SourceForge repository in 2002, development was in 2016 migrated to GitHub. In February 2018 the game's GPLv2 license was re-licensed to the GPLv3.

== Reception ==
TripleA has been compared to Axis & Allies and also Risk.

A Chip.de review called TripleA a "well done copy of Axis&Allies" and ranked it 30 of 238 in their strategy game ranking list. Chip.de named TripleA also among the "Best free 30 strategy games" in 2011. A cnet.com/download.com staff review rated it 4.5 of 5 and noted that "TripleA offer a level of complexity and detail that is reminiscent of the real thing [...] TripleA is an excellent portal to a world of historical and fantasy scenarios [...]". A Games4Mac review of the macOS version rated the game 70 of 100 in 2006. giga.de rated TripleA 3 of 5. Other reviewers of TripleA include Macworld, Ghacks, and O'Reilly Media, Inc. A review in German computer print magazine LinuxUser 2007 / 12 praised the Linux version of TripleA as "among the best open source strategy games" and "ambitious and addictive game fun". Linux Format magazine in December 2011 reviewed the game and called it "graphically gorgeous" and "TripleA isn't just a great version of the game though - it's more like a game engine [...]".

TripleA was also used and mentioned in computer science related scientific publications due to its open source nature and project size and maturity.

The Polish game magazine CD-Action included TripleA on a cover disk in 2012. As TripleA is fully free and DFSG conforming in software and content, it is included in many Linux distributions, for instance Ubuntu OS, Gentoo, or Debian.

TripleA became a popular freeware title which was offered by multiple download outlets, including digital distributor Desura. Alone from SourceForge.net the TripleA client was downloaded between 2002 and 2016 over 1.2 million times. The game's maps are provided via a separate GitHub repository and are downloaded from there after a TripleA client (from whatever source) is installed and started, indicating the existence of over 7 million TripleA installations between 2010 and May 2017 (prior to the GitHub migration) from SourceForge alone.

== See also ==
- Axis & Allies (1998 video game)
- List of open source games
