= On Thin Ice =

On Thin Ice may refer to:

- On Thin Ice (comedy group), an improvisational comedy group from Harvard
- On Thin Ice (TV series), a documentary covering a race across Antarctica to reach the South Pole
- "On Thin Ice" (The Detectives), a 1995 television episode
- "On Thin Ice", the final episode of the BBC nature documentary Frozen Planet
- "On Thin Ice", a season 4 episode of The Loud House
- On Thin Ice (1925 film), a silent lost film
- On Thin Ice (1933 film), a British crime film
- On Thin Ice (1966 film), a Soviet spy film

== See also ==
- Thin ice (disambiguation)
- Treddin' on Thin Ice, a 2004 album by Wiley
