= Axis & Allies: World War I 1914 =

Board game

- Designers: Larry Harris
- Illustrators: Jim Butcher; Nick Issac; Ryan Sansaver
- Publishers: Avalon Hill
- Publication: 2013; 13 years ago
- Years active: 2013–?
- Genres: Board wargame
- Languages: English
- Players: 2–8
- Playing time: 60'–180'
- Age range: 12+

Axis & Allies: World War I 1914 is a war and strategy board wargame in the Axis and Allies series created by Larry Harris and published by Avalon Hill. Unlike the other games in the Axis and Allies series, it focuses on World War I, specifically the European, African, and Near East theaters.

Despite its basis on real-world events, it is not intended to be an accurate simulation of history. Instead, it is designed for balanced and streamlined gameplay.

== Gameplay ==
The game is designed for 2-8 players (7 when playing with the Russian Revolution rule), representing the German Empire, Austria-Hungary, the Ottoman Empire, the United Kingdom, France, the Russian Empire, the Kingdom of Italy, and the United States of America. The first three represent the Central Powers and the latter five the Allied Powers. These countries fight to gain territories producing Industrial Production Credits. The United States may not enter the war until the beginning of round 4 unless it is attacked. Each turn consists of purchasing new units, attacking, and moving units across the board.

=== A typical turn ===
A turn consists of the following phases:

1. Purchase and Repair Units. Units are purchased with IPCS, and damaged battleships are repaired
2. Movement: Any and all units may be moved during this turn. This includes moving into enemy-controlled territories
3. Conduct Combat: Any battles are resolved using 6 sided dice, that represent the unit's strength
4. Mobilize new units: Units purchased in phase 1 are placed on the board
5. Collect income: The player collects IPCS. The amount collected varies on the territories the player owns.

== Units ==
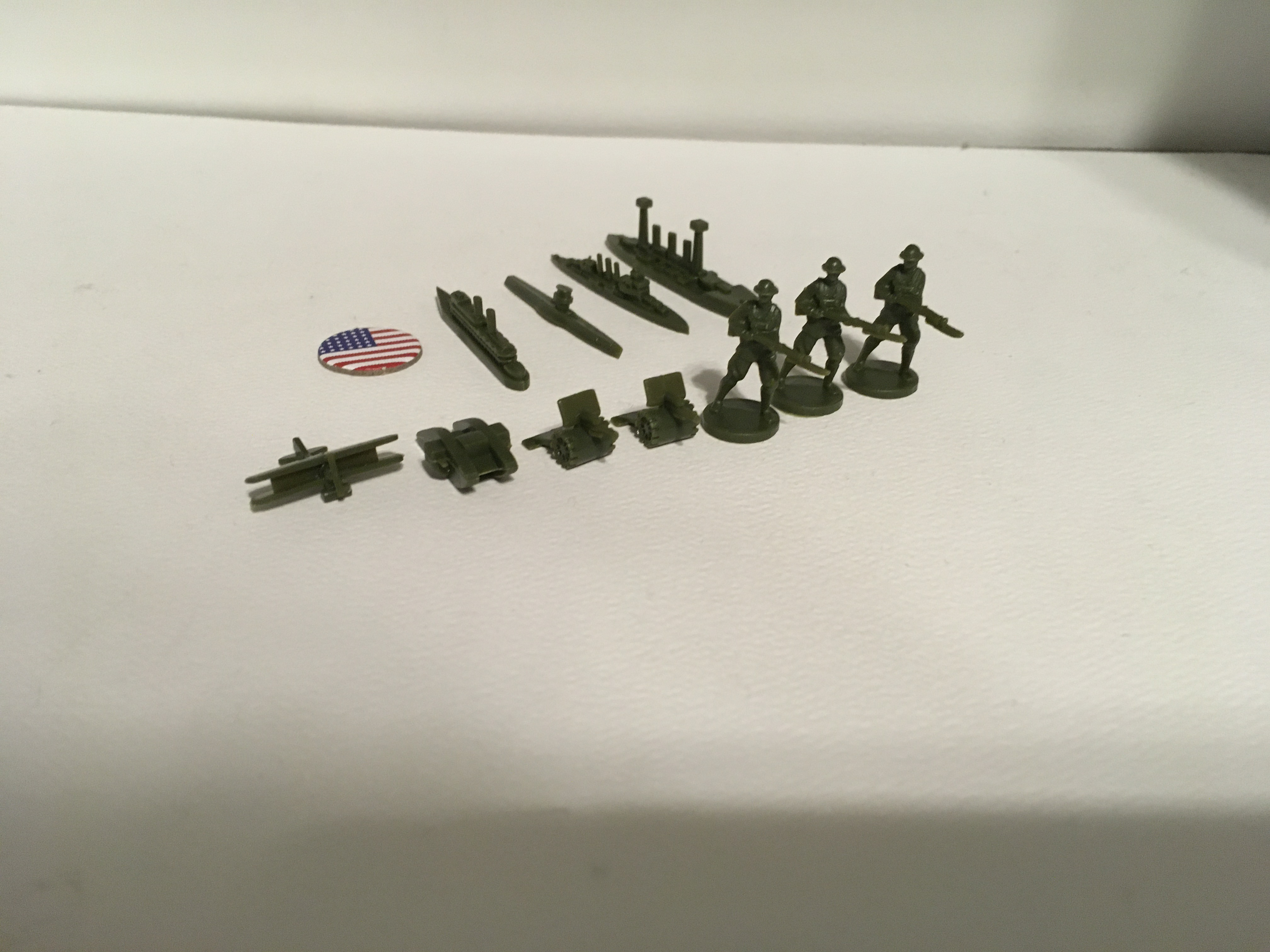
The American Pieces in Axis and Allies 1914 WW1

Unit Name	IPC Cost	ATK	DEF	MOV	Notes
Infantry	3	2/3	3	1	Infantry can be supported by artillery to an attack value of 3 or less at a 1:1 ratio
Artillery	4	3/4	3/4	1	Artillery can boost infantry to an attack value of 3 or less at a 1:1 ratio. Artillery can be boosted to 4 or less when the attacking or defending player has Air supremacy. Infantry boosted by artillery with air supremacy still attack at 3
Tank	6	2/3	1	1	Tanks may not be purchased until the 4th turn. Tanks can be boosted by artillery to an attack value of 3 or less at a 1:1 ratio. Tanks can absorb 1 hit taken when attacking, but not while defending
Fighter	6	2	N/A	2	Before land units begin rolling dice, fighters must decide air supremacy by rolling at 2 or less until 1 side has no fighters remaining. After this, fighters strafe ground units before any other attacking units. Units destroyed by strafing fighters are destroyed and may not defend or attack.
Battleship	12	4	4	2	Battleships can take 2 hits before being destroyed, but must be repaired at a naval base you own. Battleships can also bombard enemy costal territories during amphibious assaults
Cruiser	9	3	4	3	Unlike other sea units, cruisers can move 3 spaces.
Submarine	6	2	2	2	Submarines can elect to submerge, where they are removed from battle.
Transport	6	N/A	N/A	2	Transports can carry 2 land units and/or fighters

== Other rules ==
=== Minor aligned powers ===
Across the board there are territories that have 2 control symbols on them. These are minor aligned nations, and their smaller marker represents their alignment. The nation to which the territory is aligned with may enter the territory and gain infantry relative to the IPC value of the territory, with 1 unit gained being artillery. The same applies if the territory is attacked by an enemy nation.

=== Minor Neutral powers ===
Minor Neutral powers are similar to Minor aligned powers, but they have no alignment. If they are attacked, the Minor Neutral power gains infantry relative to the IPC value of the territory, with 1 unit being artillery

=== United States Neutrality ===
The United States may not enter the war until the beginning of round 4 unless it is attacked by a central powers player. The United States Navy may also not leave sea zone 1

=== Russian Revolution ===
The Russian Revolution is an optional rule. The revolution begins at the end of any Russian turn after round four if Russia is losing the war. Russia is considered to be losing the war if three or more territories adjacent to Moscow are controlled by the central powers, At least 1 other original Russian territory is controlled by the central powers or is contested, and Moscow is controlled by Russia or is contested. If the Revolution occurs, the Russian player is removed from the game, and their pieces are removed from the board. The central powers control the territories they owned at the start of the Revolution, but can no longer attack Russia or take any more territories.

=== Contested Territories ===
When a territory is attacked, it becomes contested, and loses IPC value, since two players are considered to own the territory. This is because land battles last for only 1 turn, and the units stay in the territory after the battle.

=== Winning the game ===
Victory conditions are similar for both sides. For the Allies, if they capture the German capital of Berlin and one other Central Powers capital, they win the game. For the Central Powers, if they capture two allied capitals, one of which is the British capital of London or the French capital of Paris, they are the victors.

== See also ==
- Axis & Allies
