= Axis & Allies: Guadalcanal =

Board game

Axis & Allies: Guadalcanal, released in 2007, is the fifth spinoff board game of the Axis & Allies series of games, focusing on the Solomon Islands Campaign. Like the rest of the games in the series, it was created by Larry Harris and published by Avalon Hill. This game is of a personal significance to Harris, as explained in the game's manual, since his father had been stationed at Guadalcanal, the setting of this game.
