= Axis & Allies: Battle of the Bulge =

Board game

Axis & Allies: Battle of the Bulge is a board game which depicts the Battle of the Bulge, the "last-ditch" offensive of World War II by Nazi Germany. It is similar to Axis & Allies: D-Day in that the game is played on a tactical rather than strategic level, although the gameplay is radically different from D-Day or any other previous Axis and Allies game. It is designed by Larry Harris, and published by Avalon Hill.

== Objective ==
A&A:Battle of the Bulge is played between two players: one commanding the Germans and the other the Allied forces. Unlike previous Axis & Allies games, where American and British forces are controlled by different players, the Allied player controls both American and British forces, due to the small numbers of British forces represented. American and British forces are identical in this game, and the different colors are used solely for historical accuracy.

Battle of the Bulge is played on a hexagonal grid, with the eastern parts of the board representing Germany and the large majority representing Belgium. Antwerp, the Germans' eventual objective, is not represented on the map. The objective of Battle of the Bulge is for the Germans to acquire 24 victory points, or, in the Allies' case, to prevent Germany from acquiring 24 points, at the end of eight turns of play. This objective was set at 24 points to reflect the Germans' actual progression in World War II, which would have been worth the equivalent of 23 points. Thus, Germany wins if the players' performance is better than Germans historically.

== Gameplay ==
Gameplay is divided into three phases: in the first phase, which is not performed until the fifth turn (to represent the weather conditions), aerial combat occurs. Germany deploys one bomber and three fighters, while the Allies deploy three bombers and 9 fighters into hexes on the map. After dogfighting and surviving anti-aircraft fire, the planes strike at enemy ground forces and then retreat, ending the first phase.

The second phase is used for ground combat: supplies are expended to let forces attack the enemy. After combat is resolved, the third phase begins. In the third phase, reinforcements are brought from off the board into the front line, and players may adjust their positions.

== Combat ==
The combat mechanic is radically redesigned from previous Axis & Allies games: in particular, ground units may only move and attack if they have access to supplies. Combat is done through 12-sided dice, where a system of rolling dice to determine both the number of hits and the casualties sustained, as opposed to previous games where the defender may choose to assign casualties according to their strategic needs.

Because of the size of the board and the supply mechanic, trucks have been added to Battle of the Bulge, facilitating the transport of infantry, artillery, and supplies to the front lines. Trucks may be captured and used by the enemy, and may be destroyed. They may also be sent off of the board to restock on supplies.

The major feature is the front line itself: whenever Germany enters a new hex, it captures the hex, and possibly surrounding hexes, which changes the front line in the third phase of the game. Victory points are determined based on the hexes that are on the German side of the front line at the end of the turn.

== See also ==
- Battle of the Bulge (disambiguation)
- Battle of the Bulge (1991 game)
