= Battle of the Bulge (disambiguation) =

The Battle of the Bulge was a major World War II German offensive in 1944. It was a great surprise to the allies despite the Germans using the same invasion route, and some of the same roads, to attack France in 1940.

Battle of the Bulge may also refer to:

== Literature and film ==
- Battle of the Bulge: Hitler's Alternate Scenarios, an alternate history anthology
- Battle of the Bulge (1965 film), an American widescreen epic war film
- The Battle of the Bulge... The Brave Rifles, a 1965 documentary film
- Battle of the Bulge (1991 film), a Canadian comedy short film
- The Battle of the Bulge a 1994 documentary for PBS by Thomas Lennon

== Games ==
- Battle of the Bulge (board wargame), a 1965 board wargame by Avalon Hill
- Bulge (game), a 1980 board wargame by Simulations Publications
- Axis & Allies: Battle of the Bulge, a 2007 board game by Avalon Hill
- Battle of the Bulge (video game), a 2012 iOS historical wargame

== Other uses ==
Battle of the Bulge, a nickname for weight loss
