= Ah Ah Ah =

Ah ah ah may refer to:

- Ah, Ah, Ah..., a 1990 album by Arena Hash, including the track El Rey Del Ah Ah Ah
- "Love Nwantiti (Ah Ah Ah)", a 2019 remix of the same song by CKay featuring Joeboy and Kuami Eugene
- "Ah Ah Ah" (song), released in 2020 by DreamDoll featuring Fivio Foreign
- "Ah-Ah-Ah", iconic laugh of the Sesame Street character Count von Count

== See also ==
- AAA (disambiguation)
- Ha Ha Ha (disambiguation)
