= Ahmed Al-Ahmed =

Ahmed Al-Ahmed or Ahmed Al Ahmed may refer to:

- Ahmed Al-Ahmed (born 1962), Kuwaiti fencer (1980; 1984)
- Ahmed Al Ahmed (footballer) (born 1996), Syrian football player
- Civilian who played a role during the 2025 Bondi Beach attack

== See also ==
- Ahmed Ali Ahmed, former leader of al-Qaeda in Iraq
