= Battle of the Bulge (board wargame) =

1965 wargame

- Original 1965 edition cover
- Players: 2
- Setup time: 10 minutes
- Playing time: 5–8 hours
- Chance: Medium
- Skills: Planning, Terrain control, Delay tactics

Battle of the Bulge is a board wargame published by Avalon Hill (AH) in 1965 that simulates the World War II battle of the same name. General Anthony McAuliffe (ret.), who had been commanding officer at Bastogne during the Battle of the Bulge, was a consultant during the game's development. The game proved popular and sold more than 120,000 copies, but was dogged by criticisms of historical inaccuracies, and was finally replaced by a completely new edition in 1981. A third edition in 1991 was released as part of the Smithsonian American History Series.

== Background ==
In December 1944, Allied intelligence believed that German forces were close to collapse and were incapable of mounting an attack. However, German forces surprised the Allies with a major offensive through the Ardennes that had the combined objectives of splitting the Allied forces in two, preventing the use of the port of Antwerp, and forcing the Allies to sue for peace. German forces managed to create a large salient in Allied lines (the "Bulge") before the attack was blunted and stopped, the Germans' objectives left unfulfilled. During the attack, German forces encircled the 101st Airborne Division at Bastogne and delivered an ultimatum to surrender. Brigadier General Anthony McAuliffe famously replied with a one-word refusal: "Nuts!"

== Description ==
Battle of the Bulge is a two-player game in which the German player must attack aggressively in order to attempt to change Germany's historical defeat into victory, while the American player must be able to transition from delaying tactics in the early game to assaults once force superiority is gained in the late game in order to replicate the historical Allied victory.

=== Components ===
==== 1965 edition ====
The 1965 game includes:

- 195 1/2 in (4,970 mm) single-sided die-cut counters
- 4-page Basic Game rules
- Battle Manual with Advanced rules
- 22 in × 28 in (560 mm × 710 mm) mounted hex grid map scaled at 1.5 mi (2.4 km) per hex
- two Order of Appearance cards
- Battle Results Table
- Time Record sheet
- six-sided die

==== 1981 edition ====
The 1981 game almost doubled the number of counters:

- 377 double-sided 1/2 in (13 mm) die-cut counters
- two-section mounted 22 in × 28 in (560 mm × 710 mm) hex grid map scaled at 2 mi (3.2 km) per hex
- 24-page rulebook
- two Order of Appearance cards
- Game Turn card
- six-sided die

==== 1991 edition ====
The 1991 edition's changes include replacing the venerable six-sided die with two ten-sided dice, as well as the inclusion of two sizes of counters, and a reduction in the number of counters to approximately the same number as the 1965 version. The box contains:

- 14 in × 22 in (360 mm × 560 mm) mounted hex grid map scaled at 5 mi (8 km) per hex
- 202 double-sided die-cut counters in two sizes (112 major units are 5/8 in (16 mm), 90 minor units are 1/2 in (13 mm))
- "Battle Manual" rulebook
- sheet of Basic rules
- two ten-sided dice (one blue, one red)
- two Order of Appearance cards

=== Setup ===
Gameplay begins with the historical order of battle in historical positions. Reinforcements enter the field of battle on historical dates but generally possess some flexibility regarding entry position.

=== Gameplay ===
The 1965 game uses a standard "I Go, You Go" system, where the German player moves and then attacks, and the American player moves and then attacks. In the 1965 edition, there is only a Basic game and a Tournament game. Both are 30 turns long, the difference being that the Advanced rules used in the Tournament game cover forts and fortresses, isolation and supply, American air supremacy, and one-way road traffic. There are also optional rules for Allied strategic air power, armor, and German supply. Each turn covers 12 hours of game time.

In the 1981 game, although the "I Go, You Go" system is still used, there is an intermixture of active player ("phasing player") and inactive player ("non-phasing player") turns:

1. the non-phasing player's Support Phase
2. the phasing player's Supply Phase
3. the phasing player's Reinforcement Phase
4. the phasing player's Movement Phase
5. the phasing player's Combat Phase

Once these are finished, the second player starts at #1, this time as the phasing player, and the sequence is repeated, completing one turn. Each turn represents 12 hours.

The 1991 game returns to a simpler system: the first player Moves and engages in Combat, then the second player Moves and initiates Combat. Each turn represents one full day of game time.

=== Movement ===
In all editions, each unit has a movement rate that is modified by terrain. In the 1981 and 1991 editions, Zones of control add an additional penalty for each such hex entered or exited, though the penalty does not stack. Additionally, units which avoid zones of control entirely for a turn gain movement point bonuses which are further amplified if only road movement and no combat is used. Movement is never mandatory, and any or all units may be moved each turn.

Cover of 1981 edition with artwork by Rodger B. MacGowan

=== Combat ===
After movement is completed for all units, a player may elect to enter combat with any units adjacent to enemy units. Game designer Don Turnbull asserts that the original edition of this game was the first board wargame to use a "bloodless" Combat Results Table (CRT). As Turnbull noted, this CRT "rarely dictated the complete elimination of a unit but rather attained its objectives by retreats and advances". The 1991 edition adds a "step-reduction" damage system to simulate casualties.

=== Scenarios ===
The 1965 edition has Basic and Tournament games but no additional scenarios.

The 1981 edition has a historical tournament game that lasts for 14 turns (7 days), and a full campaign game of 36 turns. The game also provides two 20-turn scenarios.

The 1991 edition includes three scenarios:

1. "Surprise": Covers the first week of the German offensive (16–21 December 1944) in six game turns.
2. "The Beginning of the End": 22–31 December 1944 (ten game turns)
3. "The Ardennes Offensive" combines Scenarios 1 & 2, covering the full battle from 16–31 December 1944 (sixteen game turns).

=== Victory conditions ===
In the 1965 game, the German player wins the Basic game by either destroying all American units, or by successfully moving 20 German units across the Meuse. In the Tournament game, the German player wins by either moving 50 units across the Meuse (40 of them mechanized), or occupying Bastogne, St. Vith and Spa while having 5 mechanized units across the Meuse.

In the 1981 game, both players accumulate Victory Points for destroying enemy units and for taking and holding significant geographic objectives. The player at the end of the game with the most Victory Points is the winner.

In the 1991 game, victory conditions vary by scenario, but in general, players accumulate Victory Points for causing step damage to enemy units, and for attaining certain geographical objectives. The winner is the player with the most Victory Points at the end of the scenario.

Cover of 1991 edition

== Publication history ==
The original game of Battle of the Bulge was designed by Lawrence Pinsky. General Anthony McAuliffe (Ret.), commander of American forces at Bastogne during the battle, served as a consultant during game development. After publication by Avalon Hill in 1965, issues were noted in some of the rules, and a revised edition was produced in 1966 with exactly the same components except an updated rule book. Battle of the Bulge enjoyed an extended period of popularity, eventually selling over 120,000 units by the time it was discontinued in 1981. However, as the official company history noted, "Always popular as a game, in later years it was roundly criticized for its lack of historical accuracy."

Bruno Sinigaglio designed a completely revised set of rules and almost doubled the number of counters. The resultant game was developed by Mick Uhl and published by Avalon Hill in 1981 with new cover art by Rodger B. MacGowan. A year after its publication, Avalon Hill provided a major revision of the rules, first included in the pages of The General and subsequently incorporated into re-printings of the 1981 game. Despite all the changes, reviewer Andy Bagley called it "very much the revising and updating of an old game rather than the invention of a completely new one".

In 1991, a third edition was designed by S. Craig Taylor that reduced the number of counters back to approximately the same number as the 1965 edition. The 1991 edition, with artwork by Charles Kibler and George Parrish Jr., was published by Avalon Hill as part of the Smithsonian American History Series.

== Battle of the Bulge and SPI ==
In 1965, Jim Dunnigan contributed an article to Avalon Hill's house magazine The General in which he criticized the historicity of the recently published Battle of the Bulge by pointing out various historical inaccuracies. In response, Thomas Shaw, at the time in charge of Avalon Hill, asked Dunnigan to design and submit his own wargame. The result was Jutland, published by Avalon Hill in 1967. Two years later, after designing other games for Avalon Hill including 1914, Dunnigan went on to found Simulations Publications Inc. (SPI), which would become the major wargame publisher of the 1970s and Avalon Hill's chief rival.

== Reception ==
In Issue 3 of the UK magazine Games & Puzzles, (July 1972), game designer Don Turnbull admitted that "Although the order of battle is not accurate, this is a most popular game, and one of my personal favourites." He noted the controversy around the order of battle, saying, "No two experts ever agree on the order of battle for this campaign; they do agree, however, that the AH version is wrong. Not that AH seems to mind." Several issues later, Turnbull also noted "There is also a 'one-way-road' rule, which players usually ignore, since it merely adds confusion without adding to the game." Turnbull concluded by giving the game a rating of 4 out of 6, saying, "All in all, this is a popular and reliable addition to any collection."

In his 1977 book The Comprehensive Guide to Board Wargaming, Nick Palmer admitted that the 1965 edition of this game was one of his favorites, but noted that in a recent poll of wargames conducted by SPI, the game had only placed 128th out of 202 games, and in a similar poll conducted by Avalon Hill of 25 of their own games, it had only placed 20th. Nonetheless, Palmer commented that "The special charm of this game is that it is usually almost impossible to tell who is winning for a long time, as the German advance always looks spectacular — but the US will turn the tide." Palmer found the game fairly balanced, and concluded "it remains frequently played and guarantees an exciting time". In his 1980 sequel, The Best of Board Wargaming, Palmer complimented the 1965 edition again, saying "The art of conveying atmosphere by terrain and a few special rules mastered in the first classics come to full bloom in this game." He noted that the Basic game was "simple, but not nearly as much fun" as the Advanced game. However, Palmer admitted that "Both versions suffer from historical problems" including a complete absence of British forces. He concluded though by giving the game an excellent "excitement" grade of 100%, saying, "Despite everything, a tremendous game."

In The Guide to Simulations/Games for Education and Training, Martin Campion questioned the entire historical setup of the 1965 edition, pointing out that "The Germans have immense power and always exceed historical results. The only way the allies can win is not by confronting them head on but by attacking the flanks of the Bulge in hopes of cutting off supply to the powerful units in front." He concluded "The balance of forces has been totally distorted in this game with the effect of making the German attack look like a sane military operation with reasonable objectives."

Andy Bagley reviewed the 1981 edition for The Wargamer by comparing it to the 1st edition, and still found some historical problems. He thought the road network was still inaccurate, noting that "the mapboard still shows clear terrain where maps and other games show dense forest". He also noted that there is no terrain penalty for advancing after a favorable combat result, resulting in the strange situation where "the attacker can cross a river in a single player-turn if it is defended but not if it is undefended". Bagley also pointed out several other historical inaccuracies such as the presence of a bridge over the Ours River on the game map that in reality had been destroyed and had delayed the German advance by a day. Despite all of these problems, Bagley concluded "I found the game very exciting to play, a facet all too often neglected in today's wargames. Despite my criticism, I shall certainly be playing it again."

In the December 1991 edition of Dragon (Issue 176), Doug Niles reviewed the 1991 edition and found much to like about this game, including an "easily accessible" game system, clear objectives for each player, and the high quality and attractiveness of the game components. He did find the game tilted in the Germans' favor in shorter scenarios, with better balance achieved in longer scenarios. Niles concluded "This is a great game for someone who wants to try a war game for a change of pace. However, the optional rules and lively game system make for a lot of replay enjoyment, even for experienced war gamers... It does a good job of covering its topic in an interesting and easily playable fashion."

== Awards ==
The 1991 edition was a finalist for a Charles S. Roberts Award in the category "Best World War II Game of 1991".

== Other recognition ==
A copy of the 1965 edition of The Battle of the Bulge is held in the collection of the Strong National Museum of Play (object 112.6285).

== Other reviews and commentary ==
=== 1965 edition ===
- Campaign #75
- Fire & Movement #65
- Panzerfaust #58 & #60
- Panzerfaust and Campaign #75
- Paper Wars #31
- Simulacrum #7
- Spartan Simulation Gaming Journal #2 & #9
- Strategy & Tactics #1, #3, & #71
- The Wargamer Vol.1 #3 & Vol.2 #17

=== 1991 edition ===
- Casus Belli #70 (July 1992)

== Further reading, strategy, and expansion ==
Avalon Hill's magazine The General, Vol.5 #27, made Battle of the Bulge the featured game with articles on both German and American strategy. Additionally, scenarios for the January 1945 portion of the battle are detailed, though several unit counters must be hand-made.

== See also ==
- Axis & Allies: Battle of the Bulge
