= Ateliers d'Automobiles et d'Aviation =

- Industry: Automotive
- Founded: 1919
- Defunct: 1920
- Headquarters: 39, rue de Berri, Paris, France
- Products: Electric cars & trucks

Ateliers d'Automobiles et d'Aviation was a Paris based automobile and commercial vehicle manufacturer between 1919 and 1920. The French manufacturer was noted for electric cars.

== History of the business ==
Production of cars and light trucks began at the company's Paris workshops in the rue de Berri, in 1919. The name Ateliers d'Automobiles et d'Aviation was generally reduced to AAA'.

With the First World War having ended only months earlier, there was at the time little contact between auto producers in France and those in Germany. There is no connection between Paris-based Ateliers d'Automobiles et d'Aviation (AAA) and the Berlin company AG für Akkumulatoren- und Automobilbau which between 1919 and 1922 was also producing cars under the name "AAA".

== The cars ==
The cars were powered by electric motors. The AAA was a large four door saloon. The cars advertised featured closed bodies with the simple square shape characteristic of 1920s car designs. At the 1919 Paris Motor Show the manufacturer offered two different chassis lengths of 3,100 mm (120 in) and 3,500 mm (140 in), the two models being designated the "AAA 6A Serie" and the "AAA 10A Luxe". The price of 55,000 francs for the larger car even in bare chassis form was considered very high. However, the price included a ten-year "Mechanical guarantee", which was at the time exceptional. The top speed quoted was 45 km/h (28 mph) and the range between charges was given as 120 km (75 miles). Power storage involved accumulator batteries with 42 cells.

== Reference, sources and notes ==
- Harald Linz, Halwart Schrader: Die Internationale Automobil-Enzyklopädie. United Soft Media Verlag, München 2008, ISBN 978-3-8032-9876-8.
- George Nick Georgano (Chefredakteur): The Beaulieu Encyclopedia of the Automobile. Volume 1: A–F. Fitzroy Dearborn Publishers, Chicago 2001, ISBN 1-57958-293-1. (englisch)
