= Ay Ay Ay =

Ay Ay Ay or Ayayay may refer to:

- Ay Ay Ay (album), an album by Los Piojos
- "Ay Ay Ay" (song), a 1913 song by Osmán Pérez Freire
- Ayayay!, a 2020 album by Christian Nodal
- "Ayayay", a 2024 song by Noga Erez from The Vandalist

== See also ==
- "Aiaiai", a 2012 song by Miliyah Kato
- "Ai Ai Ai ni Utarete Bye Bye Bye", a 2014 single by FLOW
- Ay ay ay ay (disambiguation)
