= Ahmed Al-Assiri =

Ahmed Al-Assiri, Ahmed al-Assiri or Ahmed Assiri may refer to:

- Ahmed al-Assiri (general) (born 1952), Saudi general and main suspect in the killing of Jamal Khashoggi
- Ahmed Al-Assiri (sprinter) (born 1952), Saudi sprinter
- Ahmed al-Assir (born 1968), Lebanese Islamist cleric and a participant in the Syrian Civil War
- Ahmed Assiri (footballer, born 1991), Saudi footballer
