= UFC All Access =

UFC television series

UFC All Access is a reality television show which aired on Spike TV. Hosted by Rachelle Leah, UFC All Access went behind the scenes into the lives of Mixed Martial Arts fighters in the Ultimate Fighting Championship as they trained for their upcoming bouts. It usually aired during the week of a major UFC pay-per-view event. Spike TV stopped production on the series.

== Featured fighters ==
- 2006-02-23: Rich Franklin
- 2006-04-10: Andrei Arlovski
- 2006-07-03: Tito Ortiz
- 2006-08-21: Renato Sobral
- 2006-11-13: Matt Hughes
- 2006-12-28: Chuck Liddell
- 2007-04-04: Georges St-Pierre
- 2007-05-21: Quinton Jackson
- 2007-07-02: Sean Sherk
- 2007-08-23: Randy Couture
- 2007-09-20: Forrest Griffin
- 2007-12-27: Wanderlei Silva
- 2008-01-31: Brock Lesnar
- 2008-10-24: Anderson Silva
