= Axis & Allies: D-Day =

2004 board game

- Manufacturers: Avalon Hill
- Designers: Larry Harris; Mike Selinker
- Publishers: Wizards of the Coast
- Players: 2–3
- Chance: Medium
- Skills: Dice rolling Strategic thought Team play
- Website: Official website

Axis & Allies: D-Day is the fifth version of the strategy board-game Axis & Allies, released on June 11, 2004 as a celebration of the 60th anniversary of D-Day during World War II. It lets two to three players recreate Operation Overlord or D-Day scenarios during June–July 1944. It was designed by Larry Harris and developed by Mike Selinker. The game won the Origins Award Gamers’ Choice Award 2004.

The United States, Canada, and United Kingdom land troops at Utah, Omaha, Gold, Juno and Sword beaches while Nazi Germany tries to push them back and keep control of the cities Cherbourg, Saint-Lô, and Caen. If the allies haven't captured all three cities within ten turns, Germany wins. The allies start with no victory cities in their possession.

Instead of purchasing units, players get them by placing units on "Reinforcement Charts" and then moving them to the play board. The play board also has unit silhouettes which shows how you should set up the game, instead of charts with many numbers. It makes the game much easier, less complicated, and less time-consuming. With the help of paratroopers and amphibious assaults, the allies send over troops to breach the Atlantic Wall. A new unit is the Pillbox, a little fortress with artillery inside that fires at troops about to land on the beach. Otherwise, it is all the original pieces without chips for indication of multiple units. In order to deal with the possibilities of excess numbers of units, an eight-unit limit has been enacted to prevent overcrowding of the territories.
