= All About Adam =

All About Adam may refer to:

- All About Adam (TV series), a 2010 Philippine television series titled
- "All About Adam" (Popular episode), a 1999 episode of the American television series Popular
