= Thin Ice (game) =

Board game

- Designers: Larry Harris
- Publishers: Pressman Toy Corporation
- Players: 2 to 4
- Setup time: About 5 minutes
- Playing time: 30 minutes/random
- Chance: High (luck)
- Skills: None

Thin Ice is a board game that was produced in 1989 by the Pressman Toy Corporation. The objective of the game is to place as many wet marbles as possible on a tissue, simulating thin ice, before it breaks and releases the marbles.

== History ==
It was invented by Denise Heimrich and licensed by Robert Fuhrer and Nextoy, LLC.

A 1990 TV commercial for the game used the song Wipe Out adding lyrics such as "Place a marble on the ice, but watch out! You are on thin ice, you are on thin ice!"

== Gameplay ==
The game features a lower ring with marbles and an upper ring, where a tissue is placed to emulate thin ice. Marbles sit below in a pool of water. A large plastic tweezers are included to handle the marbles; the arms were covered by a sticker showing a happy Eskimo reaching out to "grab" the marbles.

The objective of the game is to place as many wet marbles as possible on the tissue with a pair of big plastic tweezers. Eventually, the weight of the marbles will cause the tissue to break and dump the marbles into the lower ring. The player who placed the marble on the tissue that caused it to break would then have a "strike" counted against them, and the upper ring would be reset with new tissue and the players would once again place marbles atop it. The first person to break through the "ice" 3 times is the loser.

== See also ==
- Don't Break the Ice, a children's board game relying on dexterity with a similar theme
