= Clumsy Thief =

Children's mathematical card game

Clumsy Thief is a dedicated deck card game published by the company Melon Rind. The game was created by Jeanie Mehran in an effort to help her son with his addition skills. Clumsy Thief won several game awards including Academics' Choice, Major Fun Award and Parents' Choice Award in 2013.

== Gameplay ==
The game consists of 84 Money cards, 6 Thief cards and 4 Jail cards. Each player is dealt seven cards face down that they pick up and review.

The objective is to have the most money at the end of the game. Players get money by making or stealing money stacks. Players lose money if their stacks are stolen.

Players with two cards in their hand that add exactly to $100 must place them face up with one card on top of the other, creating a money stack. After all players have built their stacks and placed them on the table the stealing begins. On "Go" all players steal money stacks from other players using the cards in their hands.

Players may steal a money stack from any player if they have a card that adds up to $100 when added to the top card of that stack. After placing the card on top, players slide the whole stack to their side of the table.

A Thief card let players steal any money stack from any player. It can also steal money stacks stolen by another thief. A Jail card tops only a Thief card and takes the whole stack. Players can also top their own Thief card to prevent other players from stealing their stack.

When the stealing is over, each player takes another card and adds it to their hand. On "Go" a new round of stacking and stealing begins.

The game is over the instant any player is out of cards or there aren't enough new cards for every player. Anyone still holding cards turns them face down and discards them. Players add their cards. Money cards are worth their dollar value. Thief, Jail and discarded cards have no value. The player with the most money wins.
