= VH1: All Access =

VH1: All Access is VH1's series of original specials that offer an insider's look into the world of rock & roll, from money to fashion to feuds and more.

== History ==
All Access is a lifestyle magazine television program that embraces celebrity and current pop culture, or as they like to say: "It's not rocket science, it's only rock 'n' roll".
