= Aye Aye Aung =

Aye Aye Aung may refer to:

- Aye Aye Aung (judoka) (born 1984), Burmese judoka
- Aye Aye Aung (athlete) (born 1995), middle-distance runner from Myanmar
