= Area activity analysis =

Performance quality tool

Area activity analysis (AAA) is a performance improvement quality tool for process management of natural work teams developed in the 1990s.

== Phases ==
The analysis consists of seven phase:

1. Preparation for AAA
2. Develop area mission statement
3. Define area activities
4. Develop customer relationships
5. Analyze the activity's efficiency
6. Develop supplier partnerships
7. Performance improvement
