= Anti-actin antibodies =

Schematic representation of antibody

Anti-actin antibodies (AAA) are found at increased frequency in certain autoimmune diseases and may be of some diagnostic value.

In coeliac disease, anti-actin antibody levels correlate with the level of intestinal damage.

In autoimmune hepatitis, anti-actin antibody levels correlate with patterns of immune recognition, the pattern of recognition was specific to a small percentage of autoimmune hepatitis type 1 or cryptogenic hepatitis patients.

In gastric cancer anti-actin antibodies were elevated, along with other antibodies in severe disease with poor outcomes.

It has also been found as a paraneoplastic syndrome with myelodysplastic syndrome.
