= Arylalkanolamine =

Class of chemical compounds

Arylalkanolamines (ArROHNR_{2}) are a class of medicinal molecules that are structurally related to one another in certain respects.

They are anti-corrosive.

Detailed understanding of their structure-activity relationship is expected to aid in drug discovery.

Phen(Aryl)alkanolamine. All molecules are α-aromatic-alcohols unless stated otherwise.
Compound	Group	1/2/3° OH	Α/Β/Γ/Δ	Α/Β/Γ/Δ	N	Type of Pharmacology
PRC025	3-OH-2-BN-A	2°	γ-aminoalcohol	β	NHMe2	SN(D)RI
PRC200-SS	PP-3-A	2°	"	α,β	NHMe	NS(D)RI
Pridinol	"	3°	"		NC5H10	Anticholinergic (NMDA?)
Trihexyphenidyl (aka Benzhexol)	"	"	"		"	"
Biperiden	"	"	"		"	"
BDPC	cyclohexanol	3°	δ-aminoalcohol	γ,δ	NMe2	μ/delta-opioid agonist
Tramadol	"	"	3	α-arylalcohol	"	μ-opioid agonist(prodrug, M_{1}SNRI
Venlafaxine	"	"	2	β-arylalcohol	"	SNRI
Ciramadol	"	2°	3	γ-arylalcohol	"	μ-opioid mixed ant/agonist
Phenylpropanolamine	PP-2-A	2°	2		NH2	nor/adrenergic releaser
Cathine	"	"	"		"	nor/adrenergic releaser
Ephedrine	"	"	β-aminoalcohol		NHMe	nor/adrenergic releaser
Pseudoephedrine	"	"	"		"	nor/adrenergic releaser
Dopamine	"	"	"		"	endogenous neurotransmitter
Epinephrine	ArE-2-A	"	"		"	neurotransmitter, also a hormone
Norepinephrine	"	"	"		NH2	neurotransmitter
Synephrine	"	"	"		"	α1 agonist
Phenylephrine	"	"	"		"	α1 agonist
Levalbuterol	"	"	"		NH(t-Bu)	β-agonist
Clenbuterol	"	"	"		"	"
Haloperidol	Piperidinol	3°	δ	4,4	piper	DA antagonist
Loperamide(Imodium AD)	"	"	"	"	"	μ-opioid agonist.
