= Ansel Adams Award =

There are several awards named after American photographer and environmentalist Ansel Adams. Ansel Adams Award may refer to:

- Ansel Adams Award for Conservation Photography, offered by the Sierra Club since 1971
- Ansel Adams Award (The Wilderness Society), offered by The Wilderness Society since 1980
