= Axis & Allies: Europe =

2001 board game

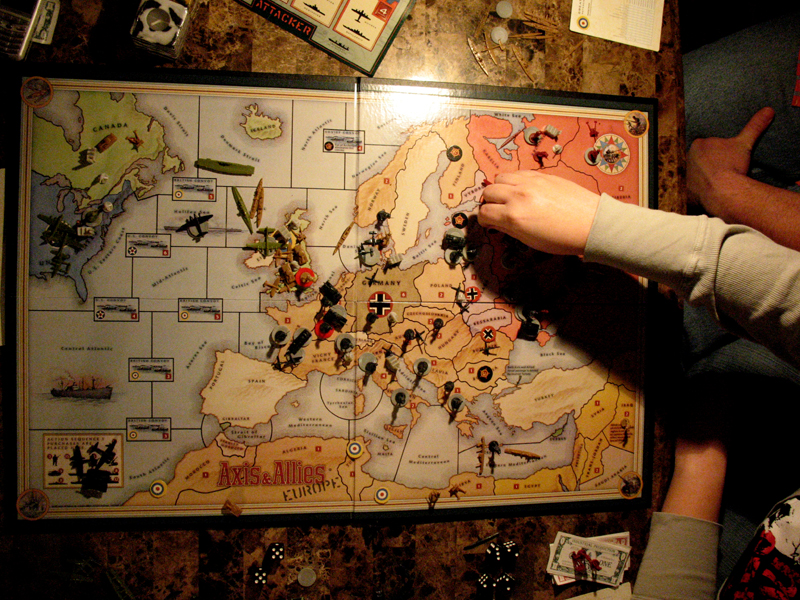
- Manufacturers: Avalon Hill
- Designers: Larry Harris
- Publishers: Wizards of the Coast
- Players: 2–4
- Chance: Medium
- Skills: Dice rolling Economic thought Strategic thought Team play
- Website: Official website

Axis & Allies: Europe is a strategic board wargame produced by Hasbro under the Avalon Hill name brand. Designed by Larry Harris, who designed the original Axis & Allies board game, Axis & Allies: Europe focuses game play on the European Theatre of World War II.

Despite its historical setting, the game was designed for a balanced competition between sides, and therefore was not intended to be an accurate historical simulation.

In 2001, Axis & Allies:Europe won the Origins Award for Best Historical Board Game of 2000.

Axis & Allies: Europe is set in the spring of 1941 and covers the conflicts between Germany and the Soviet Union, Great Britain (U.K.), and the United States (U.S.) across Europe, the Atlantic, North Africa, and the Middle East.

== Game play ==
The game is designed to be played with 2–4 players, representing the nations of Germany, the U.S., Great Britain, and the Soviet Union, with the latter three nations composing the Allied forces. Both sides compete against each other using units for control of territories, which produce IPCs (Industrial Production Certificates) used to purchase more units.

Victory is achieved in a similar manner for both sides. The Allies (the Soviet, British, and American players) must occupy Germany for one turn, while maintaining possession of their respective home territories for that duration. The German player must occupy the territory of one of the three Allied nations for one turn, while maintaining possession of Germany. In the case that the Allies win and each Allied nation is controlled by a different player, then a winner may be decided between them by determining who had the greatest increase in IPC income from the starting point.

=== A typical turn ===
A turn consists of the following phases:

1. Purchase new units using your IPCs. These units will be placed in a later phase.
2. Conduct combat movements. This involves moving units into enemy territories, deciding what combat will take place in the next phase.
3. Resolve combat. This involves a number of die rolls between opposing players, representing the combat between the involved units.
4. Conduct non-combat movement. This involves moving units that did not move in phase 2.
5. Place new units. This involves placing units purchased in step 1 in eligible territories.
6. Collect income. The amount of IPCs collected depends on the territories the player owns.

=== Units ===
Each player may control and purchase the following units.

Infantry
Infantry are the cheapest unit to purchase, but are considerably weaker than other units. They are better at defending than attacking, and move slowly at one territory in one turn.
Artillery
Artillery units are slightly stronger than infantry, but are unique in that, when combined with an infantry unit in an attack, they improve the effectiveness of the infantry unit.
Armor
Armor units are considerably stronger than infantry and artillery. They are better at attacking than defending, and are capable of moving up to two territories in one turn.
Anti-aircraft
While unable to participate directly in combat, anti-aircraft units may be used to defend against enemy aircraft.
Bombers
Bombers are an expensive offensive unit, also capable of conducting a Strategic Bombing Raid against enemies.
Fighters
Fighters are an air unit effective at both offense and defense.
Battleships
Battleships are the strongest naval unit, with strong offense and defense. They take two hits to sink.
Aircraft Carriers
Aircraft Carriers are a decent defensive unit that provide a place for allied aircraft to land.
Destroyers
Destroyers are naval units with moderate offensive and defensive capabilities. They can negate the special abilities of submarines.
Submarines
Submarines are naval units capable of attacking prior to actual combat. They may also submerge to retreat from a battle.
Transport
Transports are naval units weak in combat, but capable of carrying land units.

=== Changes from Axis & Allies ===
A number of significant game play changes were made from the original Axis & Allies.

1. Players may use two new combat units – artillery and destroyers.
2. IPCs in the possession of the Allied nations may be attacked by the German navy.
3. Players' units may not move through neutral territories.
4. There is no weapons research.
5. Players are not capable of purchasing and constructing new Industrial Complexes.
6. Friendly fighters may escort bombers during Strategic Bombing Raids and enemy fighters may attack bombers.
7. Both battleships and submarines have been given new abilities.
8. In the case where Germany captures Middle East territories, the Allied nations must pay IPCs to Germany.
9. Order of play has been changed.
10. Each country is given a sum of IPCs prior to the start of the game.
11. Allied units in Soviet Union territories are subject to special control by the Soviet Union player.

== Reception ==
The Wargamer wrote: "Axis and Allies Europe is the crowning addition to a long and glorious line of games [...]"
