= Addis Ababa Agreement =

Addis Ababa Agreement may refer to:

- Addis Ababa Agreement (1972), a peace agreement in the First Sudanese Civil War
- Addis Ababa Agreement (1993), a peace agreement in the Somali Civil War

== See also ==
- Treaty of Addis Ababa, signed in October 1896
