= Academy of Applied Arts =

Academy of Applied Arts may refer to:

- University of Applied Arts Vienna
- Academy of Applied Arts at the University of Arts in Belgrade (1948-1973)
- Academy of Applied Arts at the University of Zagreb (1950-1955)

== See also ==
- Academy of Arts, Architecture and Design in Prague
