= Andrew, Archbishop of Antivari =

Andrew, Archbishop of Antivari may refer to:

- Andrew I, Archbishop of Antivari (r. 1307–1324)
- Andrew II, Archbishop of Antivari (r. 1448–1459)
