= Army Appropriations Act =

Army Appropriations Act refers to several federal acts considered by the U.S. Congress:

- Army Appropriations Act of 1880
- Army Appropriations Act of 1901, which included the Platt Amendment
- Army Appropriations Act of 1916
- Army Appropriations Act of 1919
