= All American Airways =

All American Airways may refer to:

- All American Aviation Company, a local service carrier, later known as All American Airways, Allegheny Airlines, US Air and ultimately US Airways
- Saturn Airways, originally All American Airways, a supplemental air carrier which merged into Trans International Airlines in 1976
