= Abu Abd-Allah =

Abu Abd-Allah or Abu ‘Abdillāh is the Kunya of:

- Husayn ibn Ali
- Ja'far al-Sadiq
