= Axis & Allies (1998 video game) =

- Cover
- Developer: Meyer/Glass Interactive
- Publisher: Hasbro Interactive
- Designer: James Haldy
- Platform: Microsoft Windows
- Release: October 6, 1998
- Genre: Computer wargame
- Modes: Single player, Multiplayer

Axis & Allies is a 1998 computer wargame closely based on the Axis and Allies: Classic board game.

Players take control of one of five world powers at the start of 1942 in World War II, grouped into the opposing factions of the Allies (US, UK, and USSR) and the Axis (Germany and Japan). Victory conditions are set at the start of the game: complete world domination, the capture of enemy capitals, or reaching a set level of economic power by the Axis.

The game is turn-based, with the USSR turn first, and the USA turn last. Each power's turn of the game is broken into several phases. First is the research phase, where IPCs (a representation of industrial power) can be gambled in an attempt to develop advanced technology, such as jet engines or rockets. The remaining IPCs are then used to buy troops in the purchase phase. Troops are then moved in the combat move phase, and battles resolved in the combat phase. Non-combative moves are then performed in the non-combat move phase, new units are then placed at the powers' factories & IPCs for all territories the power now controls are collected in the place units/collect income phase and the powers' turn ends.

A second edition of the game was released in 1999 titled Axis & Allies: Iron Blitz. It added a function to allow the third edition rules of the game as well as new features such as allowing a submarine to submerge instead of withdrawal and having multiple AA guns occupy the same territory. In addition, it included many alternate scenarios, providing for events that ranged from a Western Allied-Soviet war after World War II (Allies: UK/US vs Axis: Soviet Union/(Communist) Germany), to the Molotov–Ribbentrop Pact being made into a formal alliance, which turns Japan into the Allies (Allies: UK/US/Japan vs Soviet-German Axis.) And, of course, there is the default scenario from the board game (Allies: UK/US/Soviet vs Germany/Japan.)

== Gameplay ==
Each power has a turn of 5 steps during each round of play. Each of the 5 powers will have a turn in a complete round of play. A full round of play consists of: USSR, Germany, United Kingdom, Japan, and United States. If one power's armed forces are completely destroyed, that nation is removed from play and gameplay skips that power's turn. Example: United Kingdom destroys all of Germany's armed forces. The play now follows: USSR, United Kingdom, Japan and USA. However, if Germany's ally Japan liberates Germany's capital and later Germany can produce new units, then Germany's turn is now restored as it was at the start of the game.

IPCs otherwise known as Industrial Production Certificates, is the only currency in the game. IPCs are used to buy land units, sea units or air units. Each power collect IPCs at the end of their turn. IPCs are collected for every territory under the player's control that has an IPC value at the end of each turn.

=== Victory ===
Allies: Historical victory of capturing both Axis capitals. Total victory means that both Japan and Germany are captured and none of the Allied capitals are captured by the Axis.

Axis: One of 2 conditions are met.

Total Victory: Axis capturing 2 of the 3 Allied capitals and none of the Axis capitals are captured by the Allies.

IPC Victory: When the combined IPCs controlled by both Japan and Germany reach 84 at the end of a complete round of play.

== Reception ==
Reception

Review scores
Publication	Score
Computer Gaming World	4/5
PC Gamer (UK)	63%
PC Zone	80/100
Computer Games Strategy Plus	2.5/5
PC Games	B+

The reviewer from the online second volume of Pyramid stated that "The computer version solves the problem of having to round up players, and eliminates the tedious chore of setting up the board. From the impressive opening movie to the video clips for air raids, anti-aircraft guns, and offshore bombardments, to the final clip for each alliance's victory, the game is as riveting as the tabletop equivalent."

Axis & Allies was a commercial success, with sales of roughly 300,000 copies by February 1999, after its release in September of the previous year. It reached 350,000 in sales by June. At the time, Computer Gaming World's editors wrote that "Panzer General's record as the best-selling computer wargame is in jeopardy" thanks to the success of Axis & Allies.

Axis & Allies was a runner-up for Computer Games Strategy Plus's 1998 "Wargame of the Year" award, which ultimately went to The Operational Art of War. The editors noted the game's "mass-market appeal".

In a review in the February 2000 issue of InQuest Gamer, Tom Slizewski stated that the game Axis & Allies: Iron Blitz had decent graphics and interface, but that there was "not much good to report" for all other aspects of the game. He was very critical of the artificial intelligence system that he described as "stupid" and "slow" that made poor tactical decisions and at times failed to detect defeated countries.

== See also ==
- Axis & Allies: Classic board game by Milton Bradley
- Axis & Allies: RTS video game (2004)
