= Backstage pass =

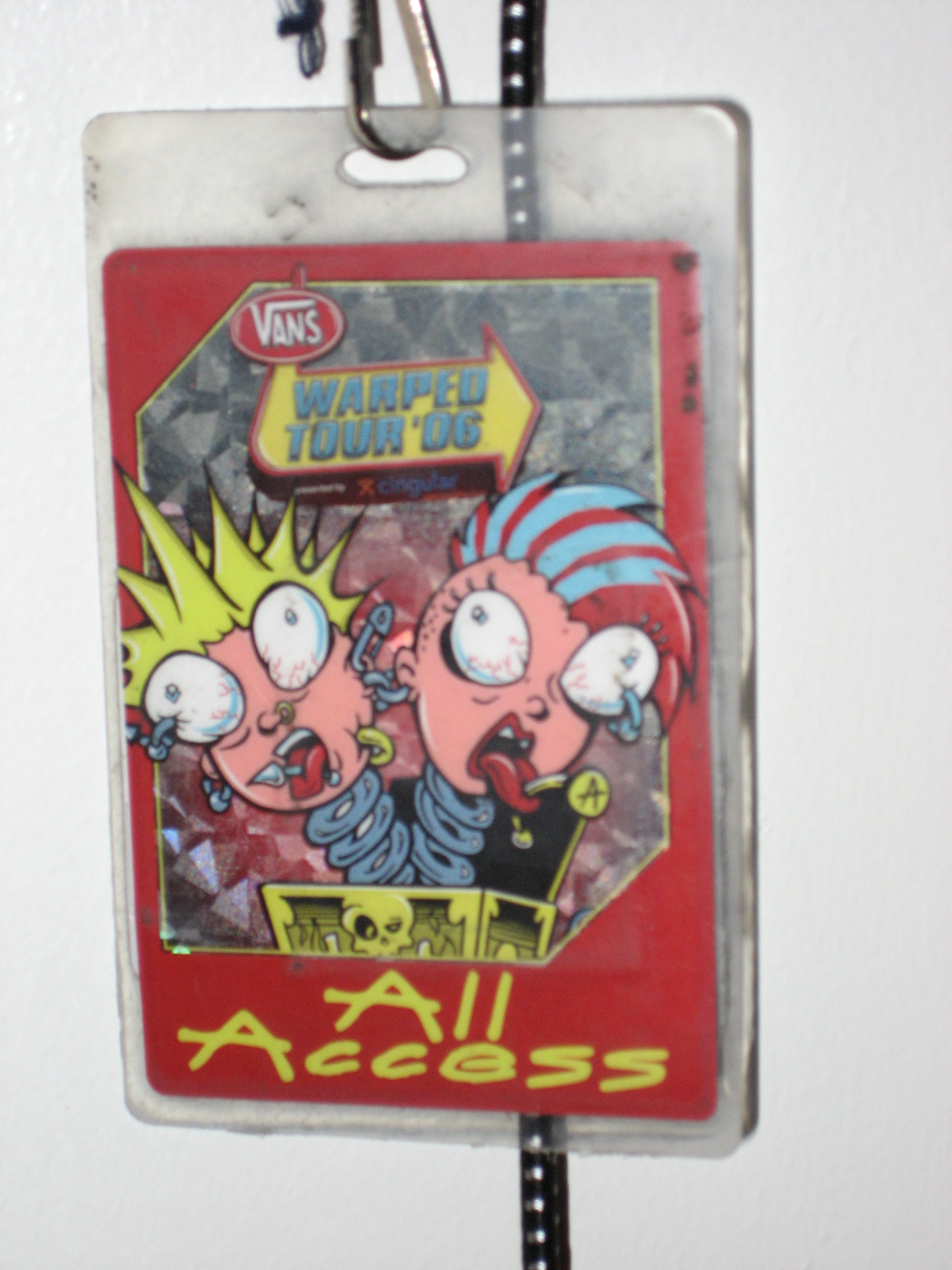
An example of a backstage pass for Vans' Warped Tour in 2006.

A backstage pass is a credential which grants its bearer access special privileges to restricted areas at an event or conference, most commonly associated with music concerts.

Backstage passes can come in the form of lanyards, stickers or wristbands. To deter counterfeiting, these passes often include holograms and unique artwork. After the performance, backstage passes often become memorabilia sold on online marketplaces, especially when the pass is signed by a performer.

== Types of passes ==
There are a number of different types of backstage passes, they can differ greatly depending on the scale of the event. These are all general guidelines:

- Access All Areas (AAA) is the highest-tier pass, and allows the bearer full access to the venue before, during and after the performance. Such passes are usually restricted to the performers, promoters and artist management.
- Very Important Person / Guest (VIP) allows the bearer limited access before, during, and after the performance to specific rooms within the venue, such as the green room. Such passes are usually allocated to close friends of the performer and promoter.
- After Show allows the bearer limited access strictly after the performance to specific rooms within the performance venue, such as the green room. Such passes are usually allocated to friends of the performer, promoter and venue.
- Working allows the bearer access to the majority of the venue, usually apart from the dressing rooms for the performer. Such passes are usually allocated to production, lighting and sound technicians.
- Local Crew passes are used by those who construct the event, such as setting up the stage. These passes are usually only valid before and after the performance, not during.
- Photo passes permit photographs with a professional camera. These cameras usually have a detachable lens, or lens bigger than 35mm and subsequently are deemed "professional cameras" by many venues, meaning they are usually banned to the general public. This pass may also entitle the bearer access to the front of the stage for a short amount of the performance; a three-song rule, meaning only photographs for the first three songs of the scheduled performance, are common procedure for many large-scale concerts.
- Meet & Greet allows the bearer limited access to a (typically) pre-show event where performers will meet with fans, pose for photographs and sign autographs. Such passes are usually allocated via performers' fan-clubs, radio-station contests, or via certain "VIP Experience" type premium-tickets.
- Other employee passes for people who work specific jobs in support of the act, such as catering, security, publicist, and merchandising personnel are sometimes also available.

== See also ==
- Road crew
- Ticket
