= Axis & Allies: Pacific =

Board game

Cover art

Axis & Allies: Pacific is a strategy board game produced by Hasbro under the Avalon Hill name brand. Released on July 31, 2001 and designed by Larry Harris, Rob Daviau, and Stephen Baker, Axis & Allies: Pacific allows its players to recreate the Pacific Theater of World War II.

While it is a strategic board game with a historical setting, it is not designed to be a historical simulation. Instead, it is designed for a stream-lined ease of play and a balancing of the two powers rather than for historical accuracy.

In 2002 Axis & Allies: Pacific won the Origins Award for Best Historical Board Game of 2001.

== Setting ==
Axis & Allies-Pacfic begins on the 7th December 1941 as Japan attacked the American Pacific Fleets at Pearl Harbor. The game is played across a large region, including the Indian Sub-continent, the resource rich East Indies, the central pacific, Hawaii and the west of America. In addition to the units and gameplay from the main Axis & Allies game, the Pacific variant contains unique features within the game such as Kamikaze attacks, convoys, island based Air Forces and Navies, destroyers and rules for the Chinese army.

== Components ==
Within the box there are 345 historical plastic pieces representing different military units of each country. In addition to these there is a board game board, national control tokens, National Production Charts, Battle Board Chart, Industrial Production Certificates (used as money), 12 dice, grey and red plastic counters, and rules. The dimensions of the box are approximately 15.5 x 10.5 x 3.5 Inches. It has part number 41388.

== Game play ==
The game is designed to be played by 2-3 players, representing the nation-economies of Japan, the U.S., China, ANZAC, and India (Great Britain) respectively, with the latter four groups composing the Allied forces. Both sides compete with units for control of territories producing IPCs (Industrial Production Certificates) good toward the purchase of most units.

The overall goal for winning the game differs for each player. The Allies (the British and America players) must either conquer and occupy the territory of Japan for a turn, or they must reduce Japan's IPC income to 9 or less by conquering other territories to win the game. The Japan player's goals are more open-ended: Japan must conquer and occupy any of the Allied capitals on the gameboard (the territories of India, New South Wales, or USA), or Japan must accumulate 22 victory points (Japan scores one point for every 10 IPCs collected at the end of its turn).

Each player starts out with a slightly different arsenal of units to deploy.

Industrial Complex
Constructs units. Can only be built by the United States. All capitals and Hawaii start with an Industrial Complex. Cannot be destroyed.
Infantry
Available to all players, these units are cheap but weak. Better at defending than attacking under normal circumstances, these units may still be used to good advantage (as more than Cannon-fodder) by a tactical player. Their movement is the most limited of any in the expansion. The U.S. can build special infantry called "Marines". Marines are better in amphibious assaults.
Marines
US specific troops. Specialized in amphibious assaults, it has 2 attack instead of 1 attack when attacking.
Artillery
Available to all players, artillery units are slightly more effective than infantry, but their greatest benefit comes when used in concert with infantry: for every matching artillery, each matching infantry's attack roll is doubled, equalling the attack roll of artillery.
Armor
Available to all players, armor units are typically rare, but are the most effective and costly land unit, with a good attack roll and a moderate defensive roll. They have the added advantage of being able to cross two land territories, by blitzing, as compared to the infantry and artillery's movement of one land territory.
Anti-aircraft
Available to all players, antiaircraft units costs as much as a tank, but are marginally useful only when defending against enemy air attacks. Each player starts with one in their capital territory.
Bombers
Available to all players, bomber units are rare but are the best in land offenses. They also have the ability to force a player to surrender IPCs to the bank by a Strategic Bombing Raid (SBR).
Fighters
Available to all players, fighters play an important role in the game. Strong in both offense and defense and with the ability to be used as cannon fodder for SBRs.
Battleships
Strongest ship available. Takes two hits to destroy.
Aircraft Carriers
Capital ship able to hold two fighters. Strong defense but weak attack.
Destroyers
Available to all players, destroyers are used for disabling submarine advantages. For the Japanese player, they can be used as transports.
Submarine
Ship with a special first strike rule that lets it sink ships without being fired back at.
Transports
Ship used to transport units. No attack and weak defense.

== Reception ==
The Wargamer wrote: "No plan survives first contact with the enemy, children or dice...and that is the beauty of Axis and Allies Pacific; every game is different, and the best or worst plan can turn on a smart move or a lucky die roll."
