= Larry Harris (game designer) =

American board game designer

- Occupation: Game designer

Larry Harris Jr. is a game designer.

== Family ==
Harris is the son of Lawrence (Larry) Harris Sr., who was a U.S. infantryman in the Pacific Theater, participating in assaults in the Solomon Islands, New Guinea and the Philippines. He is married to Katherine Harris, has four children, and three step-children.

== Career ==
Larry Harris is most famous for creating the board game Axis & Allies, as well as all of its sequels. In 1984, his first year at Milton Bradley, 13 games of his design were featured in the company's catalog. This included the three initial titles in the Gamemaster series: Conquest of the Empire, Broadsides and Boarding Parties, and, Axis & Allies.

Other companies for which he has designed games include Mattel, Coleco, Parker Brothers, Hasbro Games Group, Hasbro Interactive, and Infogrames Interactive. His other significant games include LionHeart and more. He has also assisted in the further development of Trivial Pursuit and Risk. Larry is also the inventor of Thin Ice. Harris runs his own company, Harris Game Design.

Four of his Axis & Allies games won Origins Awards, including the induction of the original game into the Academy of Adventure Gaming Arts & Design's Hall of Fame in 1996.

Harris has lived extensively in Europe and three years in Iran. He speaks fluent French, is an Army veteran with five years' service, and has been known to pilot an ultralight.
