= 1986 in games =

This page lists board and card games, wargames, miniatures games, and tabletop role-playing games published in 1986. For video games, see 1986 in video gaming.

== Games released or invented in 1986 ==
- 1830: Railroads and Robber Barons
- 2300 AD (role-playing game)
- AeroTech
- After The Bomb (role-playing game)
- Blood Bowl
- Britannia
- CityTech
- Conquest of Space
- Die Macher
- Federation and Empire
- Flux
- Fortress America
- Ghostbusters (role-playing game)
- Generic Universal RolePlaying System (GURPS)
- L'An Mil
- La compagnie des glaces (French role-playing game)
- MechWarrior (role-playing game)
- Ost
- Phantasie
- Platoon
- Polarity
- Road Hogs (role-playing game supplement)
- Shogun (Samurai Swords)
- Warhammer Fantasy Roleplay

== Game awards given in 1986 ==
- Spiel des Jahres: Top Secret Spies (German title is Heimlich and Co.)

== Significant game-related events in 1986 ==
- Coleco purchased Selchow and Righter for US$85 million.

== Deaths ==
| Date | Name | Age | Notability |
|---|---|---|---|
| February 23 | Edwin S. Lowe | 75 | Designer of Yahtzee |

== See also ==
- 1986 in video gaming
