= 1987 Origins Award winners =

Gaming award winners

The following are the winners of the 14th annual (1987) Origins Award, presented at Origins 1988:

Category	Winner	Company	Designer(s)
Best Pre-20th Century Boardgame of 1987	Shogun	Milton Bradley	Mike Gray
Best Boardgame Covering the Period 1900-1946 of 1987	Scorched Earth	GDW	John Astell
Best Boardgame Covering the Period 1947-Modern Day of 1987	Team Yankee	GDW	Marc Miller, Frank Chadwick
Best Fantasy or Science Fiction Boardgame of 1987	Arkham Horror	Chaosium	Richard Launius, Lynn Willis, Charlie Krank
Best Graphic Presentation of a Boardgame of 1987	Shogun	Milton Bradley Co	Alec Jutsum, James Brenner
Best Play-by-Mail Game of 1987	Alamaze	Pegasus Productions	
Best Fantasy or Science Fiction Computer Game of 1987	Pirates	Microprose	Sid Meier
Best Military or Strategy Computer Game of 1987	Project: Stealth Fighter	Microprose	Jim Synosid, Arnold Hendrick
Best Screen Graphics in a Home Computer Game of 1987	Pirates	Microprose	Michael Hair
Best Professional Adventure Gaming Magazine of 1987	Computer Gaming World	Golden Empire Publishing	Russell Sipe ed
Best Amateur Adventure Gaming Magazine of 1987	Polyhedron	TSR	Jean Rabe, ed
Best Historical Figure Series of 1987	The New Samurai	Ral Partha	Dennis Mize, Bob Charette
Best Fantasy or Science Fiction Figure Series of 1987	Julie Guthrie's Fantasy Line	Grenadier Models	Julie Guthrie
Best Vehicular or Accessory Series of 1987	Star Trek Miniatures	FASA	Randy Hoffa, Steve Apolloni
Best Miniatures Rules of 1987	Harpoon	GDW	Rick Priestley
Best Roleplaying Rules of 1987	Star Wars	West End Games	Greg Costikyan
Best Roleplaying Adventure of 1987	Tournament of Dreams (for Pendragon)	Chaosium	Sam Shirley, Les Brooks, Greg Stafford
Best Roleplaying Supplement of 1987	Star Wars Sourcebook (for Star Wars)	West End Games	Curtis Smith, Bill Slavicsek
Best Graphic Presentation of a Roleplaying Game, Adventure, or Supplement of 1987	Miskatonic University Kit (for Call of Cthulhu)	Chaosium	Lynn Willis
Adventure Gaming Hall of Fame	Greg Stafford		
Special Award for Outstanding Achievement of 1987	The Dragon	TSR	
Special Award for Outstanding Achievement of 1987	The Courier	Courier Publishing	Dick Bryan
