= Gamemaster (board game series) =

Board war game series

The Gamemaster Series of board games consists of five war simulation games released by the game company Milton Bradley beginning in 1984. The games were not developed "in-house" by Milton Bradley, with each game initially published in limited runs by smaller game publishers in the early 1980s before their rights were acquired by Milton Bradley. Despite this, some modern reissues of these games refer to the Milton Bradley versions as the "first edition" of each game.

The original Milton Bradley Gamemaster Series included:

- Axis & Allies (1984)
- Conquest of the Empire (1984)
- Broadsides and Boarding Parties (1984)
- Fortress America (1986)
- Shogun (1986)

The first three games were designed by Larry Harris, while the last two were designed by Mike Gray, though neither were credited for their creations until their subsequent re-releases. Of these five, Axis & Allies was the most successful, spawning several revised versions, spinoffs, computer games, and a miniature game series, though Conquest of the Empire, Fortress America, and Shogun also saw some success. Broadsides and Boarding Parties was the most significant departure from the strategic focus of the other titles in the series, instead featuring a two-player duel between naval vessels.

The rights to four of the five games in the series are currently held by Hasbro. Though all five games were released under the Milton Bradley umbrella, by the 1990s Axis & Allies was the only game being continually updated. In 1999, Milton Bradley's parent company, Hasbro, moved Axis & Allies to its Avalon Hill imprint, which specialized in board wargames. In 2004, Avalon Hill was made into a subsidiary of Wizards of the Coast, another Hasbro imprint that specialized in board games for a more dedicated "gamer" audience. Shogun is also currently published by Avalon Hill, but retitled Ikusa.

== Reissues ==
Avalon Hill began publishing Axis & Allies spin-off titles in 1999, focusing on the Europe and Pacific theaters as well as tactical recreations of specific battles. The 1984 edition of Axis & Allies remained the flagship product in the series until the 2004 release of Axis & Allies: Revised, introducing to the main game some units and rules that originated in the spin-off titles. Axis & Allies was later chosen as one of three board games re-released to celebrate the 50th anniversary of Avalon Hill in 2008, with that anniversary version of Axis & Allies featuring board set-up options to start the game in 1941 instead of 1942. From that point onward, additional revised editions of the main game as well as spin-offs focusing on theaters or battles would include a starting year in the game's title. In 2013, Avalon Hill published the first game outside of the series' World War II setting called Axis & Allies: WWI 1914. Computer game adaptations of the original Axis & Allies were released by Hasbro Interactive in 1998 and Atari in 2004. A miniature wargaming series was introduced by Avalon Hill in 2005.

Shogun was renamed twice to avoid confusion with other board games of the same name, first becoming Samurai Swords in 1995 while still carrying the branding of Milton Bradley's Gamemaster Series and then becoming Ikusa in 2011 when reissued by Avalon Hill.

Conquest of the Empire was re-released by Eagle Games in 2005 with updated rules. Fortress America was reissued with slightly revised cover art to remove Saddam Hussein while the game was still under the Gamemaster Series, and was later licensed to Fantasy Flight Games for a 2012 re-release with new and updated rules.

Following the discontinuation of the Gamemaster branding in the early 1990s, the intellectual property rights were absorbed by Hasbro during its acquisition of Milton Bradley. Hasbro subsequently reassigned the surviving properties, most notably Axis & Allies, to its Avalon Hill wargaming division in 1999.

== Games in the series ==
=== Axis & Allies (1984) ===
Designed by Larry Harris, Axis & Allies is a strategic-level board game simulating the global theater of World War II. Players control one or more of the five major belligerent powers: the Soviet Union, the United Kingdom, and the United States (the Allies), or Germany and Japan (the Axis). Gameplay utilizes a custom economic system based on Industrial Production Certificates (IPCs), which are generated by controlling territories and spent to purchase specialized military units. Combat resolution relies on a dice-based combat mechanic where different unit types possess distinct offensive and defensive statistical values. The Gamemaster edition standardized the use of plastic miniatures representing infantry, armor, fighter aircraft, bombers, and various naval vessels, establishing a visual presentation that remained consistent across subsequent editions.

=== Conquest of the Empire (1984) ===
Set during the Crisis of the Third Century, Conquest of the Empire requires players to assume the roles of rival Roman Caesars attempting to secure dominance over the fractured Roman Empire. The game board represents the Mediterranean basin divided into historical provinces. Players generate revenue (Talents) by controlling these provinces and constructing fortified cities, which subsequently allow for the recruitment of specialized military units including infantry, cavalry, catapults, and galleys. A central mechanic involves the physical movement of the Caesar unit; if a player's Caesar is captured or eliminated in combat, that player is immediately removed from the game, and their remaining assets are distributed among the surviving factions. The game also incorporates a unique inflation mechanic, where unit costs escalate as the game progresses, forcing players to continually expand their territorial control to sustain their armies.

=== Broadsides and Boarding Parties (1984) ===
Differing significantly from the strategic focus of the other titles, Broadsides and Boarding Parties is a strictly two-player tactical wargame focused on naval combat during the Age of Sail. The game utilizes a dual-layered physical component structure, featuring a traditional gridded ocean board for ship-to-ship maneuvering alongside detailed, multi-level plastic models of the galleons for close-quarters combat. The primary objective is to disable the opposing vessel using cannon fire, followed by a physical boarding action to capture or eliminate the enemy captain. The game mechanics rely heavily on positional advantage, utilizing specific wind direction rules and turning radiuses to simulate the constraints of square-rigged sailing vessels. Because it lacked the grand-strategy elements and multi-player capacity of its peers, it remained an outlier within the series and was the only Gamemaster title not subjected to subsequent reissues or revisions.

=== Fortress America (1986) ===
Designed by Michael Gray, Fortress America is an asymmetrical wargame set in a hypothetical near-future scenario where the continental United States is invaded simultaneously by three disparate geopolitical alliances. One player is assigned control of the defending United States forces, while up to three opposing players coordinate invasions from the West Coast (Asian Coalition), the South (Central American Bloc), and the East Coast (Euro-Soviet Alliance). To balance the initial numerical superiority of the invaders, the United States player receives exclusive access to a randomized deck of "Partisan" cards and the deployment of advanced defense systems, such as hovertanks and orbital laser platforms. The game features a strict turn limit and an escalating technology track for the defender, requiring the invading factions to achieve their territorial objectives rapidly before the United States military reaches critical mass.

=== Shogun (1986) ===
Set in 16th-century feudal Japan during the Sengoku period, Shogun challenges up to five players to lead rival daimyo factions in a military campaign to claim the title of Shogun. The game integrates area control with resource management, requiring players to harvest koku (rice) to construct castles and recruit armies composed of ashigaru (spearmen), samurai, and ronin mercenaries. Shogun features several distinct mechanical innovations, most notably a hidden bidding phase where players secretly allocate resources across a stylized physical tray to determine turn order, unit deployment, and the construction of fortifications. Additionally, the game utilizes a randomized action-selection mechanic via a set of physical plastic swords placed into a customized sheath component.

== See also ==
- 1984 in games
