= Michael Gray (game designer) =

American game designer

Michael Gray is an American game designer from rural Massachusetts known for his board game designs for Milton Bradley. He eventually became the senior director of global concept acquisition for Hasbro's games division. Game reviewer Tom Vasel has called him "the wisest man in all of board gaming."

Gray is credited as the designer of over 25 board games or game items including two of the most popular board games for young teenage girls, Mall Madness and Electronic Dream Phone. Games that Gray has designed or co-designed include:

- 1975 Dungeon!, credited as a co-designer as he worked on a version of this game
- 1980 Fantasy Forest, a TSR game with artwork by Larry Elmore
- 1986 Shogun, also known as Samurai Swords or Ikusa (1987 Charles S. Roberts Best Pre-World War II board game nominee)
- 1986 Fortress America (1986 Charles S. Roberts Best Twentieth Century game winner)
- 1992 Omega Virus, an electronic talking board game
- 1993 13 Dead End Drive, a MiltonBradley game
