= War in Europe (game) =

Board game

- Cover of the flat-pack version, 1976
- Publishers: Simulations Publications
- Genres: Board wargame
- Chance: Medium-low
- Skills: Strategy

War in Europe is a grand strategic "monster" board wargame published by Simulations Publications Inc. (SPI) in 1976 that attempts to simulate the entirety of the European theatre of World War II from 1939 to 1945. One of the largest wargames ever produced, War in Europe features 4000 counters, four rulebooks, and nine maps that when placed together cover an area of 38.5 ft^{2} (3.6 m^{2}). The game is nominally a three-player game (Allied, Axis, Soviet), but each side can be represented by teams of players. SPI estimated the full game would take at least 180 hours.

== Description ==
In 1974, SPI had produced War in the East, a "monster" wargame (having more than 1000 counters) that simulated the Eastern Front conflict between Germany and the Soviet Union from "Operation Barbarossa" in 1941 until Germany's surrender in 1945. Two years later, in 1976, SPI published War in the West, which covered the Allied-German conflict in Western Europe and North Africa. Later the same year, SPI published War in Europe, which combined a revised version of War in the East (henceforth called War in the East, 2nd edition) and War in the West. Players can either play one or the other, or can combine both games into one massive campaign covering the entire European Theater called War in Europe.

=== Components ===
- 4000 die-cut counters
- 4 rulebooks:
  - Standard Rules (used in both East and West games)
  - Rules used only in War in the East 2nd Edition
  - Rules used only in War in the West
  - Rules only used in War in Europe
- Nine 22" x 34" paper hex grid maps scaled to 33 km (22.5 mi) per hex
- Various game aids and Combat Result Tables

=== Scenarios ===
==== War in the West ====
- Poland 1939: four-turn introductory scenario designed to teach the rules.
- France 1940,
- North Africa 1942 (from Gazala to Tunis)
- Italy 1943
- France 1944

==== War in the East ====
- 1941
- 1942
- 1943
- 1944

==== War in Europe ====
- December 1944: The fall of Germany, beginning with the Battle of the Bulge

=== Game play ===
Each game turn represents one week, with the game covering a period from 1939–45; units are Allied and German divisions and Soviets divisions and corps.

The Combat Result Tables (CRTs) are variable according to the game year: Germans begin by attacking on the table most favourable to the attacker, but deteriorate slightly in quality during the war, while the Allies and Soviets begin on an unfavourable table and improve in quality during the game.

The Soviets may attempt to slow German tank advances by flipping their small infantry divisions to create static fortifications (which double the combat value of another unit in the hex) and by using antitank brigades (which halve the value of attacking German armour). Another factor slowing the German advance into the USSR is the different railway gauge, which means that railroad lines in the USSR take longer to convert to German control.

=== Warfare ===
Each player has air factors, which may be used either for "air superiority" (fighting the enemy air force), or to enhance the die roll for ground combat, to suppress ports or to interdict hexes, making them harder to move through; the numerically-superior air force, after winning the air superiority combat, may largely prevent the enemy from conducting the latter functions. Whereas the German Luftwaffe might have ten or twenty factors during the invasion of France in 1940, by 1944 the Western Allies alone might have approaching 100 air factors, enough to interdict almost every hex in France.

The Western Allies may also conduct a strategic bombing campaign, increasing in range and effectiveness as the war goes on, to bomb German industrial and resource centres (see below); the German player may attempt to fight this off with his own air factors and with flak units.

The game also includes very rudimentary rules for naval evacuations (evacuated units are flipped to battlegroups) and seaborne invasions. Western Allied naval forces are not shown in the game apart from the landing craft needed for invasions, and these need to be used before most of them are withdrawn for the Pacific Theatre in the latter part of 1944. The German player may also build submarine and surface naval factors.

=== Production ===
The game places great emphasis on German and Soviet production; only German production is used in War in the West and only Soviet in War in the East (in each of these sub-games the German player must add or remove units to reflect historical transfers between the fronts). Once each month, the players spend production points to construct units, which are placed on giant production spiral displays to show how many months in the future they will become available – infantry units being available fairly quickly, with armour units taking longer, and air and naval units longer still.

German production points are generated from industrial and resource centres (provided the Western Allies have not bombed them), with resource centres in Romania and the USSR – representing oil and other raw materials – needing to be controlled for the German economy to operate at full effectiveness (Germany also has a limited capacity to "loot" production points from conquered countries). German production points are increased by a multiplier, which reflects the increased productivity of the German war economy as the war progresses.

The German player has a wide of choice of units to produce: infantry, garrison infantry (for fighting partisans), static infantry (for coastal defence), Panzer and Panzergrenadier divisions (stronger SS versions of both of these becoming available later in the game), small Panzer brigades, paratroops and air transport points, flak, fortifications, supply depots, and railroad repair units. Replacement points may be produced to rebuild battlegroups into full-strength divisions at the front. The German player is limited to spending at most 30% of his production on naval units, although he may spend between 30% and 50% on the Luftwaffe.

Soviet production points are created from personnel and arms points; the latter are increasingly available as the war progresses, whereas personnel points, abundant in 1941, become scarcer and by 1944 are not available every turn, often forcing the Soviet player to cannibalise no-longer-needed infantry units for their personnel points (the arms points used to create them are lost). Soviet production is largely determined by the course of the war: the USSR needs to build infantry and antitank units first – although even in the desperate early turns the USSR is still required to build two new air factors each turn, so the Red Air Force will gradually increase in size – then switch to armoured corps and artillery units (which have offensive firepower of ten factors, equal to a German Panzer division) as the tide turns.

The Western Allies receive only the historical reinforcements - which may be accelerated or delayed if the Allies win the Battle of the Atlantic faster or slower than in reality - and suggestions for the creation of a production system (Allied production would added in the 1999 edition).

== Publication history ==
In 1974, game designer Jim Dunnigan designed War in the East, a large game (3 maps, 2000 counters) to simulate the eastern front of World War II. The result was what critic Jon Freeman called "an ungainly beast with two thousand counters and poorly written rules. If anyone ever finished it, the fact has gone unreported." Dunnigan revised the game and in 1976 released a slimmed down second edition that had only 1000 counters. Critic Freeman called this version "a lot more manageable."

SPI combined the new version of War in the East with the newly published War in the West, which covered the western front of World War II, to produce War in Europe. All three games featured cartography and graphic design by Redmond A. Simonsen. Although War in the West stayed in SPI's Top Ten list for four months following its publication War in Europe never entered the Top Ten.

In 1977, SPI released a game extension called The First World War designed by Frank Davis, that used the War in Europe maps.

Hobby Japan published a licensed Japanese version in 1979.

Following the demise of SPI, Decision Games acquired the rights to War in Europe, and produced a new version with streamlined rules in 1999. Decision also published a computer version of the game.

== Reception ==
In the five years following the publication of War in Europe, over two dozen articles containing in-depth analyses, variants and game replays appeared in Battle Plan, Moves, Fire & Movement, JagdPanther, Adventure Gaming, Battleplan, Boardgame Journal, American Wargamer, and Wargame News.

In the October 1976 edition of Airfix Magazine, Bruce Quarrie reviewed War in the West, and commented on the game's physical size, saying, "the big problem is the game's sheer unwieldiness. The playing area is composed of no fewer than nine maps [that] occupies practically the whole of any normal room's floor! Similarly, there a no fewer than 2,400 game counters [...] while to replay the entire war in the West requires some 300 game turns. For the average board wargamer, this is far too much to cope with." Quarrie concluded "if the basic space and time is available, War in the West could undoubtedly be one of the most absorbing and challenging board games yet produced."

British critic Nicky Palmer described the game as huge but not especially complex: a “”Big and Dumb” monster like Invasion America and Objective Moscow and "the king of the playable monsters" which he had actually played through over the course of a year, with the map and counters fixed to a wall with Blu Tack, a sight which had tempted visitors to his home to try a simpler game. The game is realistic enough “to simulate a good many of the war’s major turning-points” and capture some of the important causal factors. "The beautiful map and varied units ... make one itch to play it" but the basic land combat system is “pretty elementary” and “sometimes monotonous” as the fronts move “ponderously” ... “armoured breakthroughs are a little harder than historically and 1943 in particular seems to have a long hiatus in which neither side has the strength to do anything in particular”. The air system is “effective but abstract” and “Elegant, abstract” whereas naval rules are “almost non-existent” and rules for amphibious landings “insufficiently detailed”. “The heart of the game, and the only part which is sufficiently varied and complex to sustain interest throughout the game, is the production system” ... “the production rules, especially for Germany, give the most durably enjoyable aspect of the game: there are so many things which the Axis would love to build, and even the massive production apparatus which they build up is unable to satisfy every demand”. Germany will win many victories in 1939-42 only to see "a very clear picture " of units disappearing into “fragile lines” while “half the map remains unconquered as Soviet production starts to move into top gear”. “Soviet production is less interesting as it is largely determined by events" – first infantry then armour and artillery as the tide turns. “The game seems nicely balanced, with about the historical level of advantage to the Allies”. The outcome on the Eastern Front is largely determined by geography with massive battles as the Germans try to take Leningrad and Moscow. although “the Russians seem a little safer than in real life”. War in the West offers the best choice of scenarios, notably the 1940 and 1944 French campaigns whereas the Eastern Front sees “little alternative from hard grinding on the ground, after the initial shock attack [in 1941] has been absorbed”.

In The Guide to Simulations/Games for Education and Training, Martin Campion commented on the difficulties of using this game in a college setting, saying, "the only way to play the game properly in a classroom situation would be to devote almost all the classroom time for a semester to it. It would also require its own room, which could not be used by any other classes." However, he pointed out that "the possibilities for role assignments are almost endless. [...] individual rules could be taught only to those people whose roles require the knowledge. The German production chief, for example, would learn about production but would not have to be concerned with the rules for combat." Campion concluded with a further warning: "this game would require a great deal of activity on the party of the instructor/referee."

In Issue 50 of Moves, in a survey of wargames covering the Russian Front, Steve List called this "the biggest game of all [...] which could become a way of life." He concluded by giving the game a rating of B−, saying it was "a game no collection of multi-map monsters should be without."

Fire & Movement named War in Europe one of the Top Ten wargames of all time.

== Awards ==
At the 1977 Origins Awards, War in Europe was a finalist for two Charles S. Roberts Awards, in the categories "Best Strategic Game of 1976", and "Best Graphics and Physical Systems of 1976".

== Other reviews ==
- Moves #100 - Godzilla Returns: Phillip Evans
- Fire & Movement #6 - Close-Up: War in Europe: Mark Saha
- Fire & Movement #73 - World War II Anthology: Chapter 7: Global Wargames: Terry Lee Coleman
- Boardgame Journal #2

== See also ==
- Victory! The Battle for Europe
