= Fortress America =

Strategic board game designed by Michael Gray

The United States Under Attack
- Designers: Michael Gray
- Publishers: Milton Bradley
- Publication: 1986; 40 years ago
- Years active: 1986–?
- Genres: Board game
- Languages: English
- Players: 2–4
- Playing time: 180'
- Age range: 12+

Fortress America is a strategic board wargame designed by Michael Gray and published in 1986 by Milton Bradley. The game depicts a 21st century United States being invaded on three sides by three world powers. Fortress America was the fourth of five games in the Gamemaster series.

== Overview ==
Set in the 21st century, the board game begins with the premise that during the Cold War, nuclear terrorists destroyed much of the Middle East's supply of oil. In response, the United States launched into orbit a satellite based solar-power system to solve the energy crisis. At the same time, the U.S. had perfected the so-called "Star Wars" technology and incorporated a satellite-based laser system into the solar satellites. This system was capable of destroying intercontinental ballistic missiles (ICBMs) before impact. Thus, the USA was completely safe from nuclear threat, ending the era of Mutual Assured Destruction.

This creates a great deal of political turmoil - the USSR is especially upset at the nuclear balance of power being shifted - and while the rest of the world realigns in various ways (through alliances and treaties as well as conventional military conflict) the United States, complacent in its technical superiority, becomes isolationist in nature.

The game opens with the world divided into three major world powers outside of the US:

1) The Asian Peoples Alliance (yellow player)

2) The Central American Federation (blue player)

3) The Euro-Socialist Pact (red player)

These three powers have launched a surprise invasion of the now-conventionally-weak United States: Asian invaders on the Pacific coast, Central American invaders along the Southwestern border with Mexico, and the Euro-Soviet invaders along the Eastern Seaboard. The United States Navy is brushed aside. The Army and Air Force, still capable of resistance, are nevertheless insufficient to halt the multi-pronged invasions.

The unique nature of this game is the notion of three of four players cooperating for the elimination of one player (the US). The game has an interesting dynamic of the US player being outnumbered 3:1 in military strength but steadily being reinforced by laser relay towers which each have a 60% chance to destroy an enemy unit anywhere on the board each turn. The rules of combat also favor the defender.

The invaders must place their reinforcements, which arrive on an even basis over the first few turns and then run out entirely, in their own invasion zones, which are sometimes far from the front, while the U.S. never runs out and can often be reinforced right at the front. The American player receives reinforcements by drawing two cards per turn, which sometimes specify for partisans or military forces to appear behind enemy lines.

Others allow the U.S. to reconstruct shattered units from the dead pile in home cities, while all invading units are permanently out of play when lost in combat. The result is a game that - if played well by all players - will result in a very close contest. There are 30 cities represented on the board and the invaders must capture, and hold until the end of an entire turn, 18 or more of them to win the game. This allows the U.S. one round to counterattack and recapture after all the invaders have played a round and temporarily achieved their goal of 18.

== Original Milton Bradley release ==
Commercially, this was considered to be the third most successful board game in Milton Bradley's Gamemaster Series placing it in the middle of the pack. However, world events and popular culture and Hollywood have influenced a small resurgence in the game's popularity evidenced by the 2012 remake and re-issue.

The original game also had two different covers. The first had an image which resembled Saddam Hussein and the other cover replaced the Saddam look-a-like with a bearded and sunglasses-wearing version.

=== Reception ===
In 1987, Fortress America won the Charles S. Roberts Award for Best 20th Century Game of 1986.

=== Reviews ===
- Isaac Asimov's Science Fiction Magazine v10 n13 (1986 12 mid)
- 1986 Games 100

== Fantasy Flight Games release ==
In 2012 Fantasy Flight Games released a remake of Fortress America with a few design changes. A few new rule changes have been implemented. The game now has a fixed maximum number of turns. Mechanized units can "transport" foot units.

A few objectives were changed on the map. Reflecting population shifts, Kansas City and Buffalo are no longer depicted. Las Vegas and Colorado Springs have been added, and resource areas were juggled. The attackers have optional event cards. A few of the old cards were changed, and one new "free laser complex" card was added for a total of 31 cards.

== Reviews ==
- Family Games: The 100 Best

== See also ==
- Invasion America (board wargame) - a board game covering the same subject.
- Objective Moscow
