= 1984 in games =

This page lists board and card games, wargames, miniatures games, and tabletop role-playing games published in 1984. For video games, see 1984 in video gaming.

== Games released or invented in 1984 ==
- The Adventures of Indiana Jones Role-Playing Game
- Axis & Allies (Milton Bradley Company version)
- BattleTech
- British Rails
- Broadsides and Boarding Parties
- Chill (role-playing game)
- Conquest of the Empire
- The Dark Eye (role-playing game)
- The Duel (Dune expansion)
- Fringeworthy 2nd Edition (role-playing game)
- Golden Heroes (role-playing game)
- Heroes Unlimited (role-playing game)
- Justice, Inc. (role-playing game)
- Maelstrom (role-playing game)
- Marvel Super Heroes (role-playing game)
- Mekton (role-playing game)
- Middle-earth Role Playing
- Panzer Command
- Paranoia (role-playing game)
- Ranger
- Ringworld (role-playing game)
- Skyrealms of Jorune (role-playing game)
- Supremacy
- Toon: The Cartoon Role-playing Game
- Top Secret Spies
- Twilight 2000 (role-playing game)
- Wizard

== Game awards given in 1984 ==
- Spiel des Jahres: Railway Rivals (German title is Dampfross)

== Significant game-related events in 1984 ==
- Hasbro purchased the Milton Bradley Company.

== Deaths ==
Date	Name	Age	Notability
January 14	Merle Robbins	72	Designer of Uno
June 9	Allan Turoff	53	Designer of Boggle

== See also ==
- 1984 in video gaming
