= OST =

OST may refer to:

== Music ==
- Original soundtrack, recorded sound accompanying a production such as a film
- O.S.T., an alias of electronic musician Chris Douglas
- O.S.T. (album), by the People Under the Stairs

== Science and technology ==
- Object Storage Target in computing, used by the Lustre file system an others
- Oligosaccharyltransferase, an enzyme
- Open-space technology, for organising meetings
- Open Systems Theory, a form of sociotechnical systems pioneered by Fred Emery
- Orbit stabiliser theorem in mathematics
- Offline Storage Table, a Microsoft file format
- OST Family (organic solute transporter) of genes
- Origins Space Telescope, a space telescope mission
- Open Source Threat, any software demonstrating a device vulnerability that is open-source

== Organizations ==
- Office of Science and Technology, a British government agency
- Office of Secure Transportation, a US government agency
- Order of the Solar Temple, French esoteric cult
- Organisation Socialiste des Travailleurs, the Socialist Workers Organisation of Senegal
- Outer Space Treaty, a treaty regulating international law in outer space.

== Places ==
- Ostend–Bruges International Airport, Belgium, IATA code
- Old Spanish Trail (auto trail)
- East Germany, as with the name in german Ostdeutschland

== Other uses ==
- Ost (game), a 1986 board game
- Ost (surname)
