= Samurai Swords =

Samurai Swords may refer to:

- Katana, the traditional sword of the samurai
- Shogun (1986 board game), a board game renamed as Samurai Swords in 1995 (and then renamed again as Ikusa in 2011)
