= Buffalo Bill Gun =

Toy gun made by the Milton Bradley Company

- Type: Toy gun
- Company: Milton Bradley
- Country: United States
- Availability: 1884–?

The Buffalo Bill Gun was one of the first toys made by the Milton Bradley Company. The toy was based on the popular Buffalo Bill's Wild West Show. The strenuous life, so widely favored as the century drew to its close, was reflected in many games that Americans played at home. The Milton Bradley Company, like many other game manufacturers, was alert to the trend. As soon as Buffalo Bill's Wild West Show had proved to be popular, company technicians devised the Buffalo Bill Gun, a wooden model that shot wooden pellets.

== Overview ==
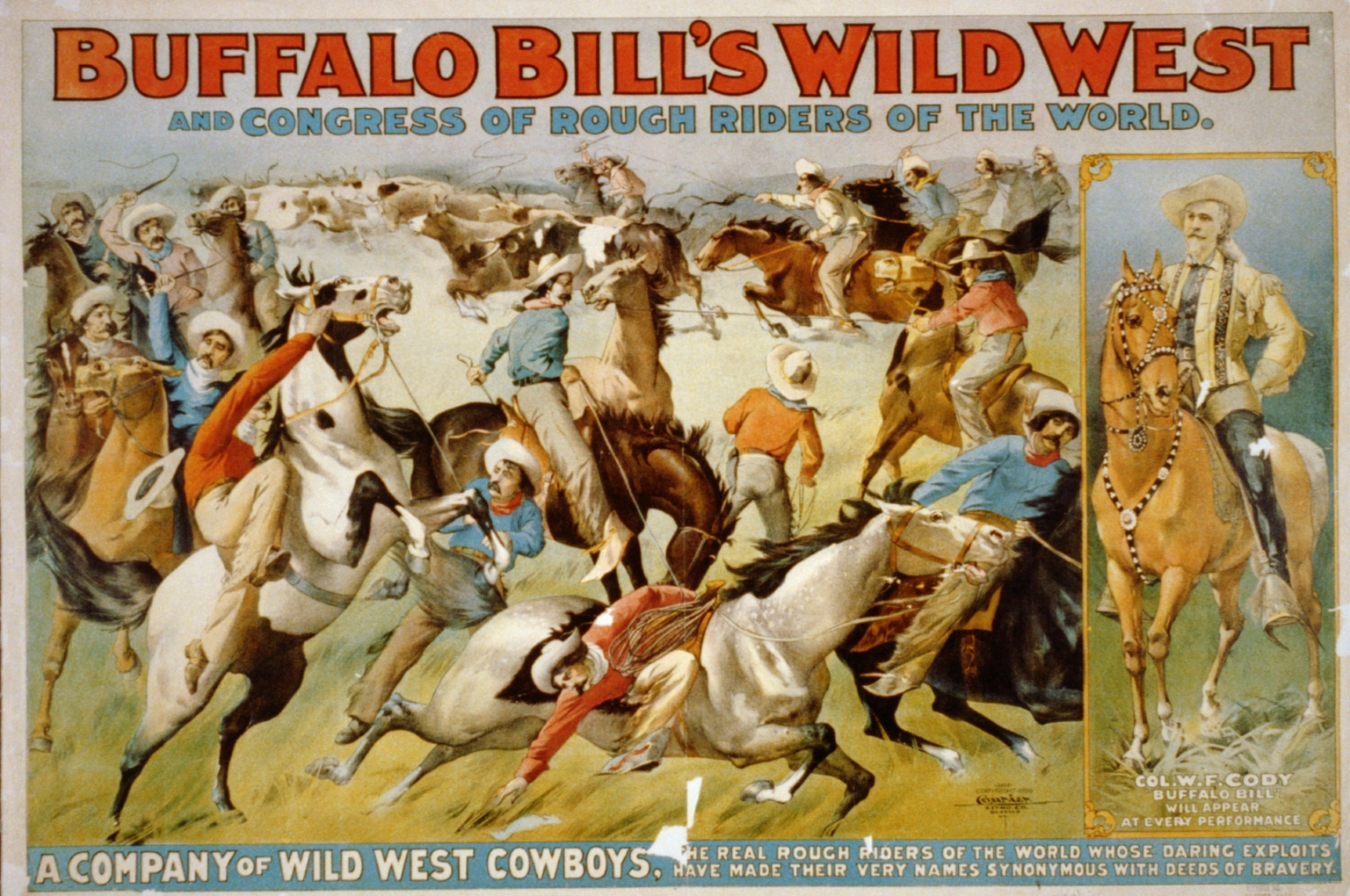
The popular Buffalo Bill's Wild West Show served as inspiration for the toy

The Buffalo Bill Gun was the most popular toy the company had produced to date. Appearing in 1884, it was immediately sold out and the Company could not keep up with the re-orders. Company space was enlarged for this high demand for Buffalo Bill Guns, yet the production could still barely keep up with the demand. The American Bookseller called it "a wonderful demand for the 'Buffalo Bill' gun," and said, "The beauty of the gun is that it will shoot accurately almost any kind of missile: arrow, heavy shot, marbles, pebbles, beans, and, as was discovered last Fourth of July, cannon torpedoes."

The expansion of the factory allowed the Company to produce other products that would not have been possible before expansion, such as the lawn game Enchantment, Pitch-a-Ring, Ring Toss, or Jackstraws. The popularity of the toy led to the production of inexpensive competitors; to compete with the knockoffs, Milton Bradley produced its own "cheap gun", the Springfield.
