= War in the East =

1974 WWII board wargame

War In The East: The Russo-German Conflict, 1941-45 is a board game published in 1974 by Simulations Publications.

== Description ==
In 1974, SPI had produced War in the East, a "monster" wargame (having more than 1000 counters) that simulated the Eastern Front conflict between Germany and the Soviet Union from "Operation Barbarossa" in 1941 until Germany's surrender in 1945. Two years later, in 1976, SPI published War in the West, which covered the Allied-German conflict in Western Europe and North Africa. Later the same year, SPI published War in Europe, which combined a revised version of War in the East (henceforth called War in the East, 2nd edition) and War in the West. Players can either play one or the other, or can combine both games into one massive campaign covering the entire European Theater called War in Europe.

== Publication history ==
In 1974, game designer Jim Dunnigan designed War in the East, a large game (3 maps, 2000 counters) to simulate the eastern front of World War II. The result was what critic Jon Freeman called "an ungainly beast with two thousand counters and poorly written rules. If anyone ever finished it, the fact has gone unreported." Dunnigan revised the game and in 1976 released a slimmed down second edition that had only 1000 counters. Critic Freeman called this version "a lot more manageable."

SPI combined the new version of War in the East with the newly published War in the West, which covered the western front of World War II, to produce War in Europe. All three games featured cartography and graphic design by Redmond A. Simonsen. Although War in the West stayed in SPI's Top Ten list for four months following its publication.

== Reception ==
In the 1977 book The Comprehensive Guide to Board Wargaming, Nicholas Palmer states that "There are two editions, of which the more recent is preferable as it mates with War in the West and clarifies some rules."

In the 1980 book The Complete Book of Wargames, game designer Jon Freeman called the second edition of War in the East "a bit simpler and a bit more playable than [GDW's rival monster game] Drang Nach Osten!. However, Freeman thought the complexity and length of the game made it only suitable for die-hard gamers, and only gave it an Overall Evaluation of "Fair", saying, "the point of a game this size is hard to imagine, although it certainly keeps people off the streets."

== Reviews ==
- The Guide to simulations/games for education and training
- Games & Puzzles #70
- The Playboy Winner's Guide to Board Games
