= Conquest of the Empire =

Board game

- Designers: Larry Harris; Revised by Glenn Drover & Martin Wallace
- Publishers: Milton Bradley; Eagle Games
- Players: 2 - 6 players
- Setup time: 5 minutes
- Playing time: 3–4 hours
- Chance: Low
- Skills: Dice Rolling, Strategy

Conquest of the Empire is a military strategy board game set in the Roman Empire after the death of Marcus Aurelius, with 2 to 6 players pitting their armies against each other in an attempt to become the ruler of Rome. The game was created in 1982 by Larry Harris and published by The Citadel under the title VI Caesars. Harris revised the game for Milton Bradley in 1984 to be reissued under the title Conquest of the Empire as part of the Gamemaster series. The game was re-released in the summer of 2005 by Eagle Games, redesigned by Glenn Drover. The gameplay in Conquest of the Empire shares similarities to Axis & Allies, another Larry Harris project within the same series.

== Milton Bradley version ==
Players begin with a Caesar, six generals, a small number of combat units (4 infantry), and a home province. There are six home provinces: Hispania, Italia, Macedonia, Numidia, Egypt, and Galatia—each of which contains a fortified city. The selection of home provinces available to the players is determined by how many are playing. The goal is to capture the other Caesars.

All units (except galleys) must be grouped in a legion containing any number of up to seven units. Each legion must be under the control of a general or Caesar to move, although a legion may be stationed without a commander in a province if it contains a city. All reinforcements are placed in the home province, and cannot be moved to the battlefronts until the beginning of the following turn.

=== Combat Units ===
Unit Type	Original Cost	Strength	Movement
Infantry	10	4	1
Cavalry	25	5	2
Catapults	40	6	1
Galleys	25	3(when empty at sea)	2

- Galleys—a naval unit required for a legion to cross the Mediterranean or other bodies of water. Only one general per trireme may be on board. Reinforcement triremes are placed on the coast of the home province, and a player may own a maximum of six under the home color at any given time. Embarking or disembarking from a coast requires one troop movement. If there are some units inside the trireme, must be notified to the rest of the players.
- A Caesar or general may travel unaccompanied for up to two movements in provinces under the player's control. He does not have any combat strength of his own and may be captured if the province is invaded by another player.
- Cavalry have different strength characteristics when involved in a naval battle.

=== Gameplay ===
Players take turns, using their legions to conquer other provinces, for which they exact a tribute at the end of their turn (measured in talents), which pays for their military expenditures. In addition to combat units, a player may decide to build a city on the province, which provides additional tribute, and fortifications for the city, which provides a combat advantage in battle. Players may only collect tribute when in control of their home province. In addition, a talent bonus is awarded for the capture of another player's home province or Caesar.

Roads can be automatically built between cities of neighboring provinces under a player's control. This allows a legion to travel to any part of the road network in only one movement. A city may also be destroyed, along with its roads and any fortifications, to prevent an enemy from collecting its tribute and extending a road network.

Tributes are measured with a player's marker placed along the tribute scale at the bottom of the game map. When any player reaches a level of 100 talents, single inflation is triggered, permanently doubling the cost of items from their original cost for all players for the rest of the game, starting with the turn of the next player. At the 200 talent level, inflation (called double inflation this time) is triggered once again, permanently making the cost of all items triple the original cost starting with the next player's turn.

Players can undertake any number of actions during their turn, provided they can make them by not exceeding a legion's ability to move. Captured leaders may be held prisoner in a player's home province (or with Caesar if the home province has been captured) for ransom or exchange, or executed and permanently removed from the board.

When a player captures an opposing Caesar, that opponent loses the game, and all remaining forces and territories are placed under the control of the conquering player. The conquering player may not build new triremes using the opponent's color or in the opponent's home province but may use existing triremes as his own, as well as use the captured generals to lead a legion. A player wins the game when the last opposing Caesar has been captured.

=== Combat advantage and battle ===
A combat advantage is given to the player who has more catapults in the battle, equal to the difference between the number of catapults of the opposing forces. A fortified city gives the defending legions an additional advantage of +1 for this calculation, and the fortifications/catapults cannot attack. When the player with the combat advantage attacks, the advantage is added to their die roll to determine if that roll eliminates a combat unit.

To battle, starting with the attacker, each player alternates turns in which they declare an opposing piece to attack and roll a die. If the number rolled (including any combat advantage) equals or exceeds the attacked piece's strength, the attacked piece is removed from the board. An attacker may attack with more than one legion at a time, and from more than one direction. Only the attacking forces have the option of retreating to their original position(s) (with each general having their option). If a force has been destroyed, the losing general(s) is/are captured by the ultimate winner of the battle, and the loser's triremes destroyed, although the die must be rolled for this to occur in a naval battle, and a trireme can only be attacked after all legions have been destroyed.

Since an overwhelming number of catapults can effectively increase their advantage by eliminating the opposing catapults, experienced game players feel that the catapult piece is too powerful, hurting the game's playability.

== Reception ==
Allen Varney reviewed the 1984 Milton Bradley version of Conquest of the Empire in Space Gamer No. 72. Varney commented "Conquest of the Empire is a superb contest of skill - not strong on simulation, but very good at capturing the grandeur that was Rome."

== Reviews ==
- Games #61
- 1985 Games 100

== 2005 version ==
The 2005 re-release featured a tweaked version of the original rules as Conquest of the Empire: Classic. In this version, the combat system was changed. Dice now featured images on all sides that represented your units. If you'd roll an infantry, an infantry unit from your army would make a hit. Catapults are now more balanced.

== Conquest of the Empire II ==
The 2005 re-release contains two rulesets and is therefore in a sense 'two games in one'. Besides the classic rules, there is also a new ruleset heavily inspired by another Eagle game, Struggle of Empires by Martin Wallace, and represents a more 'modern' type of board game. Players now fight for influence in key provinces and troops are not limited in their area movement anymore. New concepts include forced alliances, chaos points, action cards, and senate votes.
