= Polarity (game) =

Board game using magnetic disks

Polarity is a board game that requires strategic thinking and dexterity to control hovering magnetic discs.

== Development ==
Polarity was invented in 1985 by Canadian artist and designer Douglas Seaton. It was first published in 1986. The game has had a tumultuous past, with production changing hands several times over the past four decades. The game has been published by Telemotion Technologies, Irwin Toy, briefly with Mattel and most recently by Temple Games. The game ships in a canvas sleeve and include the magnets, the board, and a paper rulebook. An unrelated game of the same name is published by a company called Mindwalk (Company).

== Gameplay ==
The purpose of the game is to gain points by forming stacks of discs. The playing pieces are magnetic discs, with one side white and the other black, north and south respectively. They are identical with the exception of a neutral central disc which is coloured red.

Play starts with one player tossing the central red disc in order to determine which player plays with which colour/magnetic polarity. Each player then lays 5 'foundation discs' of their colour starting with the white player. Each disc can be placed on the playing area with no limitation other than to be inside the external circle and not touching the red disc.

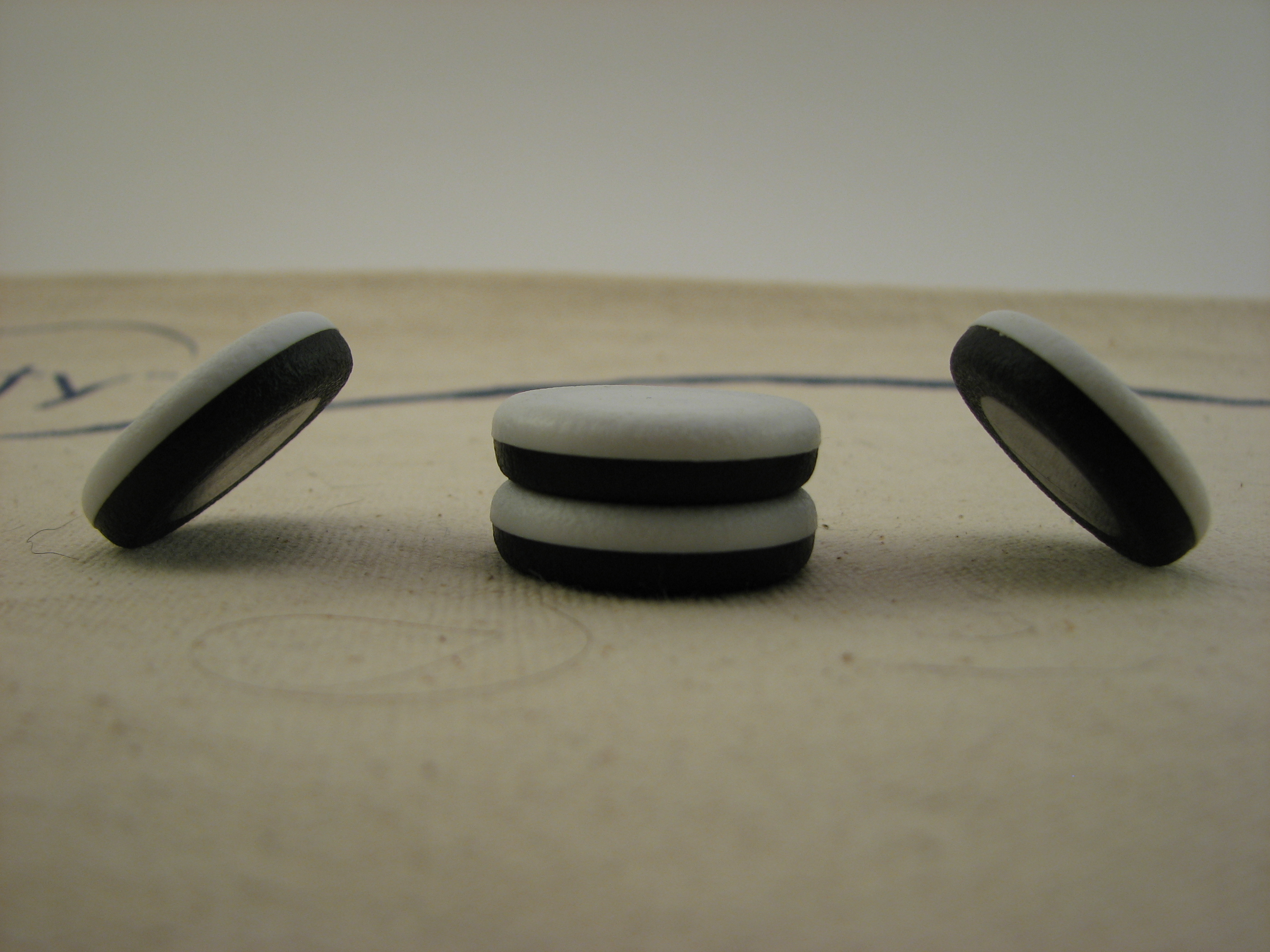
Two leaners that have been played off a tower

Play then proceeds by placing further discs within the playing area, balanced, leaning, on the magnetic fields of preceding pieces. These pieces are known as 'leaners'. Moves which disrupt the pieces currently in play by making them fall or stick together are known as 'faults', and end a player's turn. If a fault results in two or more pieces touching each other, the opposing player then has an opportunity to capture those pieces by forming them into towers, which at the end of the game score points. Occasionally a player will intentionally fault, causing one of their own pieces to fall flat onto the play surface, thus making it easier to play further pieces.

The play ends when one player has exhausted their supply of pieces or if a piece touches the center red disc. The winner of the game is determined by points scored, which are based on the number of pieces in towers of a player's color, and the pieces remaining in the opponent's hand.

== Reception ==
The game review site Tame the Board Game warned that "This isn't a quick game, and it does require a certain level of skill, dexterity and attention to play – at least, if you want to improve the way you play after getting your head round the rules." The review concluded, "Although it sounds complex, this game is easy to play after you've given yourself a few tries."

== Awards ==
At the 2005 Origins Awards, Polarity won a Vanguard Innovative Game Award.
