= Milton Bradley Company (building) =

- U.S. National Register of Historic Places
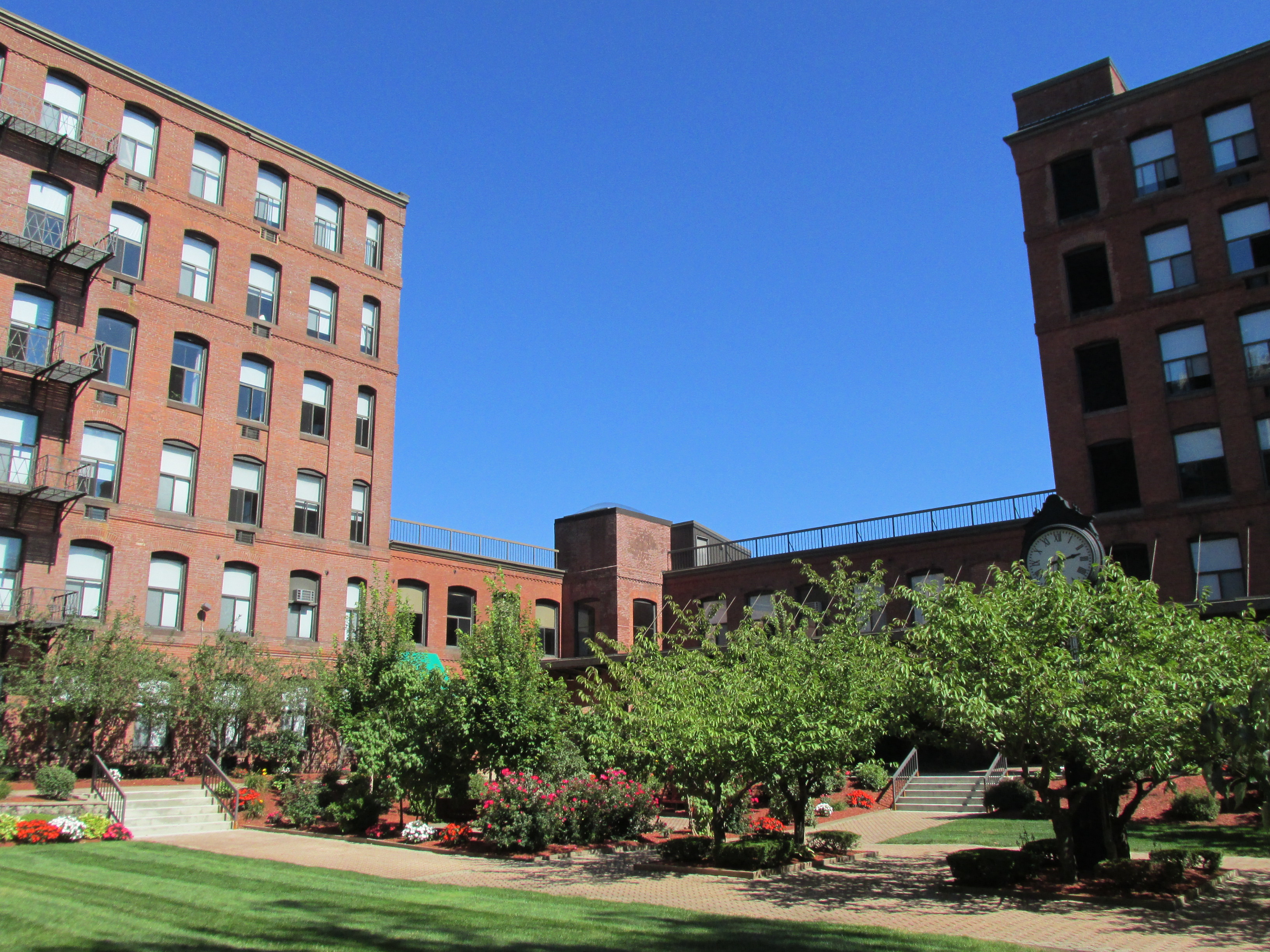
- Building courtyard as seen in 2013

- Location within Massachusetts Location within the United States
- Location: Park, Cross, Willow Sts., Springfield, Massachusetts, United States
- Coordinates: 42°6′1″N 72°35′1″W
- Area: 2.5 acres (1.0 ha)
- Built: 1880
- MPS: Downtown Springfield MRA
- NRHP reference No.: 83000756
- Added to NRHP: February 24, 1983

The Milton Bradley Company is a historic former factory complex at Park, Cross, and Willow Streets in Springfield, Massachusetts, United States. The factory was built beginning in about 1880, and expanded over the next decades to include a variety of brick multi-story buildings that are relatively utilitarian in appearance. When built, the property belonged to George Tapley, a principal in the Taylor and Tapley Manufacturing Company and a childhood friend of Milton Bradley. Bradley had entered the toy business in the 1860s, and moved his company to Tapley's premises in 1882.

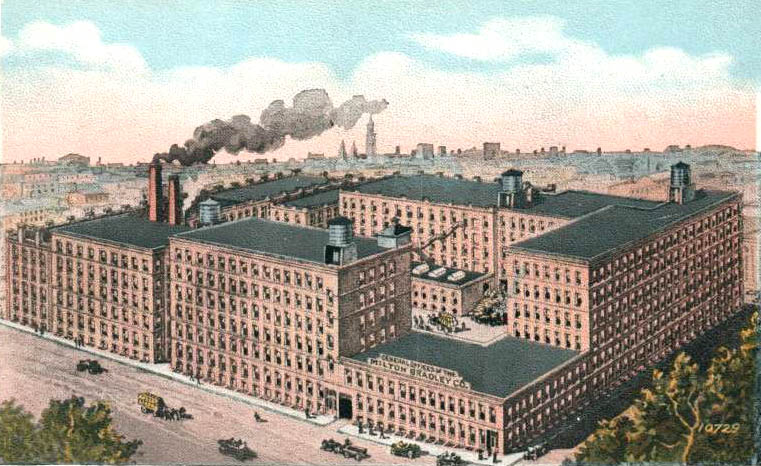
The building depicted in a 1910s postcard

The success of his eponymous company led to a significant expansion of the premises, which eventually came to occupy an entire city block. The facilities were used in all aspects of toy and game manufacturing, including a lithographic print shop.

The company moved its manufacturing to 443 Shaker Road in suburban East Longmeadow in the late 1960s, and the complex was converted into residential housing in the late 1970s. It was listed on the National Register of Historic Places in 1983, one year before Milton Bradley was taken over by Hasbro.

The complex is located just south of downtown Springfield, and is a roughly U-shaped collection of buildings, bounded on the south by Park Street, the west by Willow Street, and the north by a continuation of Cross Street. The buildings are all of brick construction, and range in height from two to six stories. Elements of architectural interest include windows set in segmented-arch openings with brick corbelling, corner quoining, and parapets at the rooftops.

== See also ==
- National Register of Historic Places listings in Springfield, Massachusetts
- National Register of Historic Places listings in Hampden County, Massachusetts
