= Mr. Bucket =

Tabletop game and toy

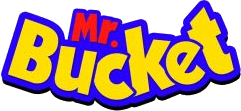

- The package, multiple colored shovels and balls, and the Mr. Bucket toy
- Designers: Wayne Kuna
- Publishers: Milton Bradley (1991–?); Pressman (2017–present)
- Publication: 1991; 35 years ago
- Years active: 1991–present
- Genres: Tabletop game
- Languages: English
- Players: 2–4
- Playing time: 10'
- Age range: 4+
- Skills: Hand-eye coordination

Mr. Bucket is a tabletop game and toy published by Milton Bradley and released in 1991, which was discontinued but re-released in 2007. It was discontinued again and re-released again in 2017. The game features a plastic motorized bucket which ejects differently colored balls from its mouth. The players use plastic shovels to scoop up the balls and place them back inside Mr. Bucket.

== Gameplay ==
The objective of the game is for a player to get all of their balls into Mr. Bucket before he pops them out of his mouth. To set up the game, blue, green, yellow, and red plastic balls are scattered across the floor. Each player chooses a shovel that corresponds to the ball color they need to collect. To start the game, one player switches on Mr. Bucket. Once Mr. Bucket is switched on, players scoop up the balls that match their shovel's color and drop them into the top of Mr. Bucket. While the players collect their balls, at regular intervals Mr. Bucket spits out one of the balls that are inside him. The winner is the first player to get all three of their balls in Mr. Bucket at the same time.

== Awards ==
Oa Therapy Associates, a clinic in the treatment for sensory problems included Mr. Bucket in 2005's list of toys that helps hand/eye coordination.
