= Supremacy (board game) =

Board game

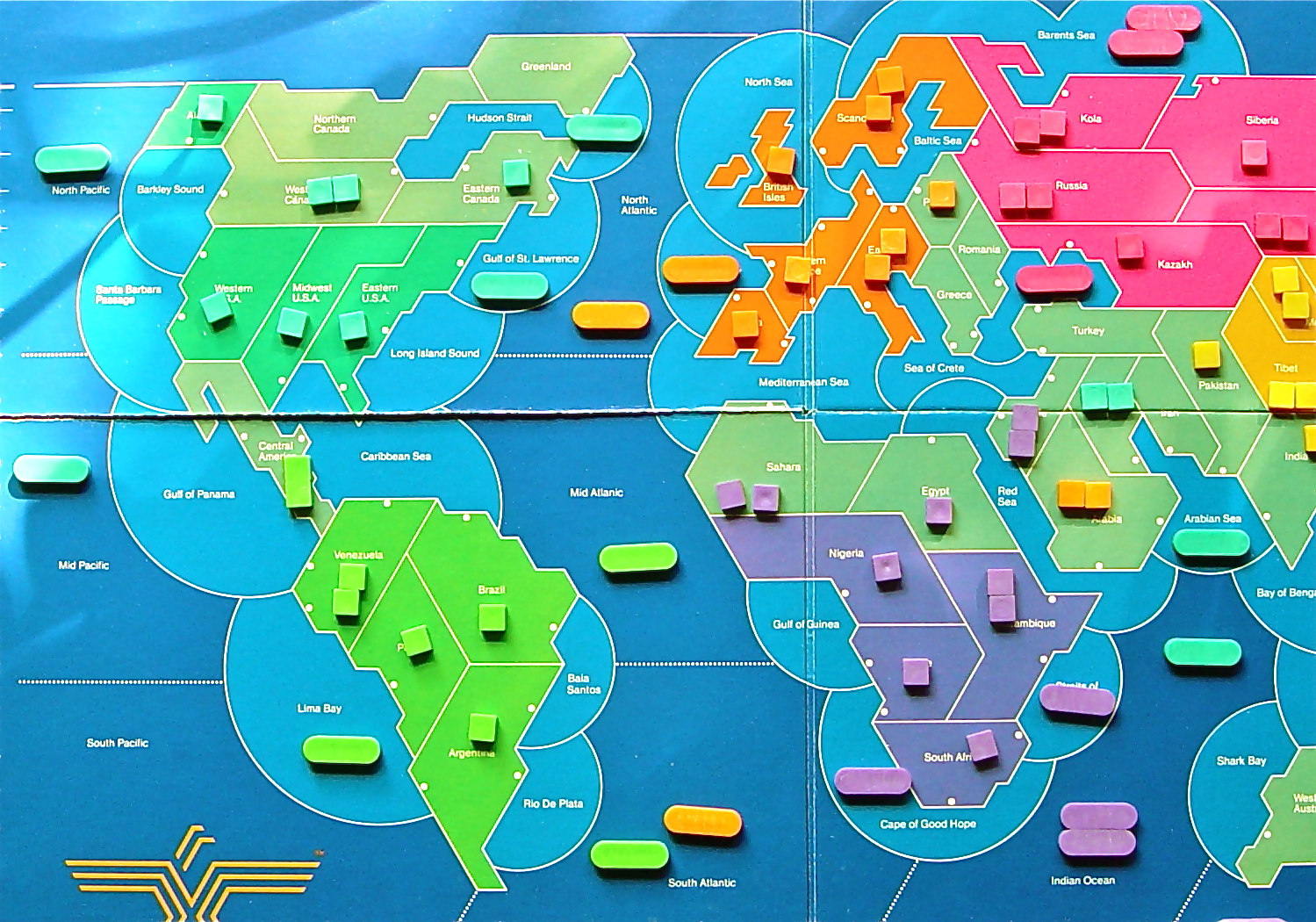
Supremacy game board and pieces

Supremacy: The Game of the Superpowers is a political, economical, and military strategic board wargame published in 1984 by Supremacy Games, and designed by Robert J. Simpson.

== Map ==
The game uses an area map similar in concept to the one used in Risk. However, Supremacy also divides the oceans into sea zones. In 1991 the Supremacy: Mega Map expansion was released doubling the amount of playable territories.

=== Land zones ===
Land zones are divided into two categories; active home superpower territories, and neutrals/warlords/non-active superpower territory.

=== Sea zones ===
The seas and oceans of the world are divided into two categories; dark blue (deep water), and light blue (coastal) zones. Attacks from the sea from naval forces or land invasions are only possible from a light blue zone.

== Superpowers ==
Players choose, or are given, one of six superpowers: • Confederacy of South America • Federation of African States • League of European Nations • People's Republic of China • United States of America • USSR

=== Expansion ===
- Confederation of Canarctica
- Commonwealth of Australasia

== Resources ==
Oil, Minerals, and Grain are the three resources in the game. Players draw resource cards on the prospect stage to determine which mines, farms, and oilfields they control, they can only control resources in other superpower territories if they have invaded and occupied said territory. This ignites many conflicts because players need resources to build and move military units, fight battles, and control the population, earn money on the "Sell to Market" stage, upgrade their technology, and defend their country. Each superpower may control up to twelve units of each resource, if they defeat and subsequently occupy an enemy superpower they can take control of their supply center and have up to 24 of each resource. Additional units may be sold on the world market.

== Military units ==
In the original version of the game, there are only two types of units; land and sea. Three military units would cost your superpower, 300 million, and one of each resource, referred to as a "set". Many expansion packs added more playable units to the game. In 1990 "Main Battle-Tanks" expansion was released adding tanks to the game. Tanks have increased firepower and allow for more aggressive attacks against defending armies, they cost 500 million, and one "set" of resources. Navies have the unique ability of moving army units quickly around the map to assist you in your attempt at global domination.

== Expansion sets ==
- Resource Deck 2 (Resource Deck 1 is in the original game)
- Main Battle Tanks (expansion set with new parts)
- Warlords and Pirates of the Neutral Zones (expansion set)
- Boomers - Ballistic Missile Subs (expansion set with new parts)
- Blister Pack - Tanks (For Warlords and Pirates of the Neutral Zones expansion)
- Blister Pack - Boomers (For Warlords and Pirates of the Neutral Zones expansion)
- The High-Tech Edge for Conventional Forces
- The High-Tech Edge for Strategic Forces
- Colonial Legions and Merchant Marine
- Neutron Bombs, Killer Satellites, Missile Silos and Spaceports (new parts)
- Fortuna (news, rumors and acts of God)
- Field Marshal's Handbook (book)
- The Middle Powers (expansion set with 2 new powers)
- The Unconventional Forces (expansion set)
- Mega-Supremacy map
- Mega-Supremacy Commander-in-Chief's Rule Book
- Mega Supremacy: Challenge of the New World Order (book)

== Nuclear weapons ==
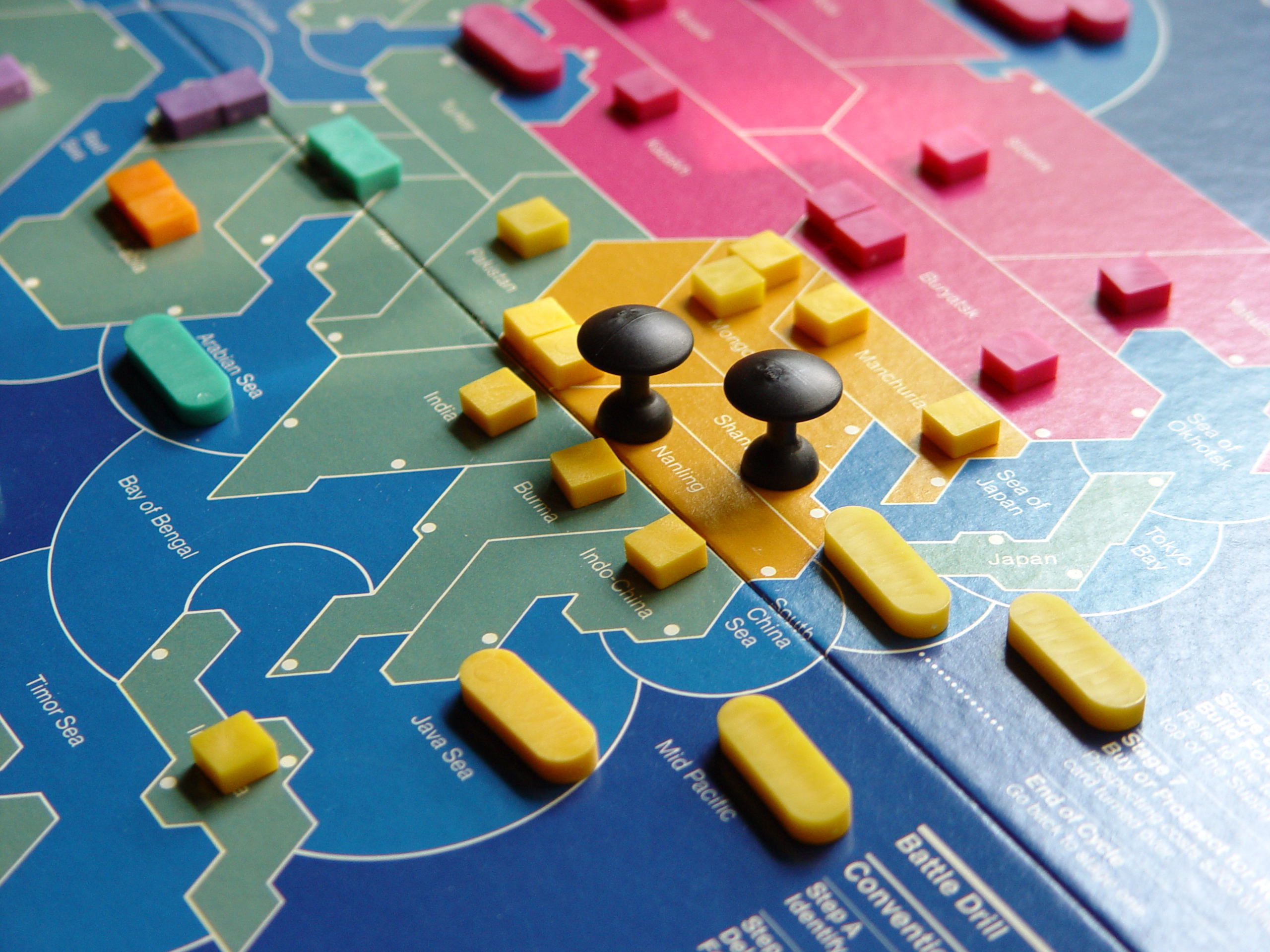
The black tokens are nuclear mushroom clouds.

Nukes are available during the research and development phase of the game. A player turns over one card at a time going through the resource deck until they stop, or turn over a nuclear weapon card. Each card turned costs the superpower 200 million, and then the superpower may build the first nuke at 500 million and a mineral resource.

Nuclear winter: When there are 12 mushroom clouds on the board, the placer of the 13th rolls a die. On a 6, the game is over. The number on the die gets lower as each succeeding cloud is placed, until it hits 18 and a nuclear winter has truly set in and everyone loses.

== L-Stars ==
L-Stars, or laser satellites, are the means to prevent nuclear war from being the easiest way to win the game. These are developed during the research and development stage much like nuclear weapons (but more expensive).

== K-Sats and neutron bombs ==
Killer Satellites are an expansion that allows military units in space (only good against other K-sats or L-stars). Neutron bombs work like nukes, only they do not make the affected territory uninhabitable.

== Fortuna deck ==
The Fortuna: News, Rumours, & Acts of God expansion was released in 1989 and added a total of four decks each consisting of 61 cards, for a total of 164 cards. Each card contained two headlines for a total of 328 headlines of News, Rumours & Acts of God. In addition, each deck contained a trademark card that could be used for the Meteor Crash rules variant. Cards ranged from moving the markets up and down, to anthrax breaking out in certain territories and killing units, to solar storms wiping out K-Sats and L-stars, to meteor strikes wiping out entire territories with their units and resources.

== Goals ==
The object of the game is to eliminate all other opponents, through military, economic, and tactical maneuvering. It is possible for the game to end in a nuclear winter, in which case everyone loses.

== New edition ==
A new design team, Command Post Games, acquired the rights and released an all new edition in 2013: Supremacy 2020.

They have also released a new Expansion: Rising Crescent. This expansion adds a new Terrorist player to the game.

== Reception ==
Tony Watson reviewed Supremacy in Space Gamer No. 76. Watson commented that "Supremacy really has some potential as a fun, competitive beer-and-pretzels game on par with the recent Milton Bradley releases like Axis & Allies. If you're willing to rework some of the rules [...] it may realize that potential. But as it stands now, its beautiful components are badly hobbled by an inadequate set of rules. Sadly, I can't recommend this one."

Martyn Tetlow reviewed Supremacy for Adventurer magazine and stated that "In conclusion, a thoroughly enjoyable game that left me itching to play again. Comparisons with Diplomacy are inevitable, and I would say it certainly ranks close with that classic game. Just as a warning for trigger-happy players, if 12 or more areas become irradiated, the game stops and everyone has lost. To quote the rules; 'Sic transit gloria mundi!'- so passes away the glory of this world."

Mark Rein-Hagen reviewed Supremacy in White Wolf #13 (December 1988), rating it a 4 out of 5 and stated that "I have a great deal of fun playing "Supremacy"; it has captured my imagination, and I can't think of a better, more appropriate compliment."

Designer Ananda Gupta cited Supremacy's relationship between conventional and nuclear forces as an inspiration for Twilight Struggle (2005).

== See also ==
- Supremacy, a play-by-mail version of the board game

== Reviews ==
- Casus Belli #44 (April 1988) (as "Suprematie")
- Casus Belli #46 (Aug 1988)
- Games
- Jeux & Stratégie #50 (as "Suprematie")
- Analog Science Fiction and Fact
- Game News #10 (Dec., 1985)
