= The First World War (wargame) =

Board wargame published in 1977

- Publishers: Simulations Publications Inc.
- Publication: 1977
- Genres: Board game

The First World War, subtitled "August 1914–November 1918", is a board wargame published by Simulations Publications Inc. (SPI) in 1977 that simulates World War I.

The game is an expansion of the SPI "monster" game War in Europe, and does not come with maps; players must own a copy of War in Europe and must re-mark the World War II maps with fortifications and national boundaries representing Europe in 1914.

== Description ==
The First World War is a highly complex "monster" wargame with 2000 die-cut counters that are used on six of the 22" x 34" paper hex grid maps taken from War in Europe. Changes related to Europe in 1914 have to be marked on the maps. Each nation starts with a National Morale level. As morale falls during the war, this affects supply, combat proficiency and movement of reserves. When morale falls to zero, the nation drops out of the war.

Resource Points are required to launch offenses and build new units, but armies only receive a fresh supply of Resource Points every three months, so management of them is crucial. Players can also use resource points for defense, or can give ground instead. Naval combat and submarine warfare are handled off-map in an abstract way.

Players can choose from five scenarios that each cover one calendar year of the war, or they can play the campaign game of the entire war, which is estimated to take over 100 hours to play.

== Publication history ==
In 1976, SPI published the monster World War II wargame War in Europe, which featured 4000 counters and nine maps. The following year Frank Chadwick was given the task of making a relatively cheap War in Europe expansion that would simulate the First World War.

Chadwick accomplished this by designing a game that required players to mark up the maps from War in Europe. In addition, since the Western Front of the First World War didn't feature any significant movement after 1914, Chadwick settled on a game of resource management, calling it "an exercise in logistics planning. Although this necessitates an enormous record-keeping burden, the management of resource points and supply depots on the map is the player's primary responsibility; the movement and engagement of combat units is merely a secondary chore."

SPI published The First World War as a boxed set in 1977 with graphic design by Redmond A. Simonsen. Whether it was the game's static nature and emphasis on accounting, the requirement to mark up the War in Europe maps (rendering them unusable for the original game) or because World War I wargames did not sell well in the U.S., the game was not a success for SPI. It failed to appear in their Top Ten List of bestselling games.

== Reception ==
In Issue 22 of the British wargaming magazine Perfidious Albion, Paul Sanderson commented "the rules are simple and well-written, [and] the designer has introduced an innovation to simplify play." Although Sanderson understood the need for economic rules, he called them "an oversimplification of fact." Sanderson also pointed out historical problems with the placement of both rivers and railways. Sanderson concluded, "If you've bought and played War in Europe, then First World War is worth a buy. Otherwise, NO."

In his 1980 book The Best of Board Wargaming, Nick Palmer thought that despite the game's complexity and the need to "deface" the maps from War in Europe, "the game works out rather well." Using the 1914 scenario as an example, Palmer thought it "presents an interesting problem and an uncharacteristically fluid situation [...] the scenario gives a pleasant taste of the game." Palmer concluded that First World War was "A sober but interesting game if players are willing to make the initial map changes."

In The Guide to Simulations/Games for Education and Training, Martin Campion had issues with the game, saying that it "has many good ideas, but it does not work as a simulation of the war. [...] the main problems are an unrealistic assignment of resource points, a combat system that makes offensives even more impossible than they were historically, a supply system that prevents operations in areas where they occurred historically, and assorted other rules."

== Other reviews and commentary ==
- Fire & Movement #9
- Strategy & Tactics #51
- The Wargamer Vol.2 No.22
- Games & Puzzles #70
