= Broadsides and Boarding Parties =

Broadsides & Boarding Parties
- Designers: Larry Harris
- Publishers: Milton Bradley; The Citadel
- Genres: Board game
- Players: 2 players
- Playing time: 60 minutes
- Chance: Low
- Skills: Dice Rolling, Strategy

Broadsides and Boarding Parties is a board game published by Milton Bradley in 1984 as part of their Gamemaster series. It was the 3rd in the series of games that are all designed by Larry Harris. It is the only game of that series to feature a two player game (all of the games in the Gamemaster series were for two or more players), Broadsides and Boarding Parties is a duel between a Spanish galleon and a pirate ship. Players take turns moving their ship and firing at the other ship to sink her. If the ships collide then players may take boarding parties onto the other ship to try to win.

The original version of this game, published by The Citadel in 1982, used a paper map and cardboard pieces and did not have the plastic ships, cannons, and other playing pieces. When Milton Bradley bought the publishing rights, they added these components to their 1984 edition to bring the physical components in line with the other games in the series. However, many players found that the large ship models were difficult to disassemble, making the storage of this game awkward.

A more serious problem was that the gameplay was not considered up to the level of the other games in the series. There was relatively little strategy and more luck involved than the other games. As part of a series, Broadsides and Boarding Parties was unfavorably compared to the other games and was less popular.

Broadsides and Boarding Parties was discontinued several years after its introduction.

== Reception ==
Allen Varney reviewed the 1984 Milton Bradley version of Broadsides & Boarding Parties in Space Gamer No. 72. Varney commented that "Broadsides & Boarding Parties is not worth the money. The components can't save the weak design. It might be okay for helping two players kill 20 minutes while waiting to play Axis & Allies, but otherwise there's not much value here."

== Reviews ==
- Adventure Gaming #13
