= L'An Mil =

Board game

L'An Mil is a 1986 board game published by Jeux Actuels.

== Gameplay ==
L'An Mil is a game in which a multi-player power-politics wargame is set in medieval France around 1000 AD, featuring dual-language cards and board.

== Reviews ==
- Casus Belli #33
- 'Jeux & Stratégie #40
