= Phantasie (game) =

Phantasie is a board game published by Gametime Leisure.

== Gameplay ==
Phantasie is a game in which a boxed fantasy board game blends traditional board game mechanics with role-playing elements. Players choose or generate characters with distinct abilities—combat, magic, stealth—and navigate a colorful mapboard filled with dungeons, danger zones, and limited-access areas. The goal is to develop the characters, gather wealth, and ultimately defeat the Alchemist in his lair. Gameplay involves drawing cards each round that trigger quests, combat, or magical effects. Movement can be enhanced by mounts or spells, and players can use a wandering guard or random monsters to hinder opponents. The game supports 2–6 players and emphasizes short-term objectives.

== Reception ==
P. Vicar reviewed Phantasie for Adventurer magazine and stated that "One thing I do like about this game is its flexibility; most of the rules come as optional features which can be used independently of each other. The 'play-as-you-learn' rules mean you can virtually start playing as soon as you open the box. Overall, a very good game for 2-6 players, but it might suffer through the highly competitive state of the board games market at the moment."
