= Flux (board game) =

1986 board game

Flux is a board game published in 1986 by Wotan Games.

== Contents ==
Flux is a game in which players duel on the Great Planes of Grob to become top wizard.

== Reception ==
James Wallis reviewed Flux for Games International magazine, and gave it a rating of 3 out of 10, and stated that "I tried to get enthusiastic about Flux but it just didn't work. It's a lacklustre game in look and feel and the rules need much adjustment before it becomes enjoyable."
