= Conquest of Space (game) =

Conquest of Space is a board game published by Duncan Games.

== Gameplay ==
Conquest of Space is a game in which a board game for 2 to 4 players is centered on interstellar conflict and resource gathering. It offers both a basic and an advanced mode. The basic version functions largely as a race game, with random events driven by a "Hazard and Challenge" chart. The advanced version introduces player-versus-player attacks during the search for mineral ores used to power beam weapons, but these encounters are also dictated by the chart. Marketed to players aged 8 and up, the game aims for a younger audience.

== Publication history ==
Conquest of Space was the first game published by new small company Duncan Games.

== Reception ==
Mike Willis reviewed Conquest of Space for Adventurer magazine and stated that "Unfortunately, it lacks the excitement to attract a younger person and the complexity to interest someone of my advanced years(?!)"
