= 13 Dead End Drive =

1993 board game

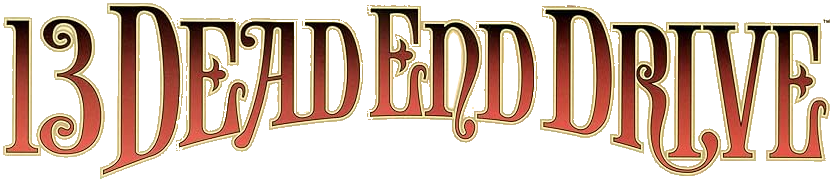
- Designers: Michael Marra; Andrew Berton; David Wyman
- Illustrators: Michael Gray
- Publishers: Milton Bradley; Hasbro
- Publication: 1993; 33 years ago
- Genres: Board game
- Languages: English
- Players: 2–4
- Playing time: 45'
- Age range: +9

13 Dead End Drive is a murder-themed board game originally released by Milton Bradley in 1993. It was followed in 2002 by a spinoff, 1313 Dead End Drive. Currently, Winning Moves Games USA publishes the game in the USA.

The story behind the game involves the death of a wealthy old woman triggering a feud over her will. The players utilize traps located on the game board, which represents a mansion, to kill characters controlled by other players in order to claim the estate for themselves.

== Gameplay ==
At the start of gameplay, players are dealt "Character cards" which correspond to matching pawns on the board. Since there are 12 characters, it is often the case that players control more than one character. However, which player controls which character is not revealed. Along with the character cards, there are also Portrait Cards, which determine who the current favorite for the inheritance is, and Trap Cards, which are used to spring traps and knock off other players.

During each turn, a player rolls two dice and moves two pawns, one pawn for each die. It is legal for players to move a pawn that is not theirs in order to bring it closer to or onto a Trap Space. All pawns must be moved off the red chair spaces before any pawns can be moved a second time or onto a trap space. If a pawn is moved onto a trap space by exact roll only, the player must have the corresponding trap card in his or her possession in order to spring the trap. Springing traps is not mandatory, however. After that, play proceeds on to the next player. A pawn cannot pass through or land on the same space as another pawn during the same turn.

During the game, a Portrait Card is displayed in the picture frame above the fireplace. That character is now the current favorite to inherit the fortune. At that moment, for all intents and purposes, that character is now marked for death and must try to escape the mansion before he or she is either knocked off or the portrait changes (see "Special Spaces and Rules" below).

Also, during the game, a Detective is waiting outside, slowly advancing toward the front door. His arrival signifies the reading of the will and the announcement of the winner. The Detective can only move one space at a time, and only when a Detective Card (hidden inside the Trap Card pile) is drawn. There are 13 steps to the front door. If the Detective makes it to the front door before all other characters have been eliminated, the game is over.

=== Ways to win ===
There are three ways to win 13 Dead End Drive:

- Be the last character alive.
- Escape the Mansion while the final character's picture is displayed in the Picture Frame.
- Have the final character's picture displayed in the Picture Frame when the Detective reaches the front door.

=== Traps ===
13 Dead End Drive has five different booby traps that are used to dispose of other characters. In the story of the game, the traps are designed to make deaths appear accidental. The traps are the Chandelier, the Bookcase, the Stairs, a Statue in a suit of armor, and the Fireplace: if a pawn has the misfortune to land on the trap space in front of or under one of these traps, the Trap card is played and the trap is sprung in the following ways:

- To activate the Chandelier, flip a switch in the music room that drops the chandelier onto the pawn, eliminating it from play.
- To activate the Bookcase, move that pawn up onto the top of the ladder and rest that pawn on top of the bookcase in the library, and flip a switch that will send the pawn flying back onto the board and eliminating it from play.
- To activate the Stairs, a player can move the pawn up onto the top of the stairs in the hall and flip a switch that will violently toss the pawn back down the stairs and onto the board, resulting in its elimination.
- To activate the Statue, a player can flip a switch in the gallery that will send a statue in a full suit of armor crashing down onto the pawn.
- The Fireplace is activated in the dining room when a player flips a switch that will send the pawn flying backwards and into the figurative fire, though the box describes it as a Trap Door.

When a player moves a pawn onto a Trap Space, they must draw a card from the Trap Card pile (if they do not already have the matching trap card in their possession). If the player draws the matching Trap Card, they can either play it immediately or hold the card for future use. If the player does not have the matching Trap Card, the trap cannot be sprung, but the card can be saved for future use. There are also "Wild" Trap Cards which permit all traps to be used anytime a pawn is in that space. If, however, the player draws a Detective card, the Detective is moved one space forward, but the player is permitted to draw another Trap Card before ending the turn.

Once a trap is sprung, that pawn and the matching Character Card are laid down on the "Discard" pile on the board (the couch). If during the course of play, a Portrait Card comes up for a character that has been knocked off, that card is immediately taken down and placed on the "Discard" pile, revealing a new Portrait. The Portrait cards are shuffled at the beginning of gameplay and concealed by an "Aunt Agatha" portrait card to hide the known deck order.

=== Characters ===
- Aunt Agatha: The dowager heiress whose fortune everyone is competing to gain. Her character card is shown at the start of the game, covering all other characters in the portrait frame.
- The Detective: Gradually gets closer to the mansion with every detective card. When he enters the front door, the game is over.

The players take the roles of the twelve suspects who compete for the will. They are:

- Parker: the chauffeur, who would use the money to race in the Indianapolis 500.
- Pierre: the inept chef, who seeks to finance his own TV show, Cooking for Profit.
- Clay: Agatha's tennis coach, an also-ran tennis star who sees the money as a chance to repay old debts and make a last-ditch effort to be a sports star.
- Madame Astra: Agatha's personal fortune-teller, who believes her years of service will finally pay off in getting the money.
- Smothers: the butler who served Agatha's family for over thirty years, who seeks to retire in style, cruising the world and having people wait on him for a change.
- Charity: Agatha's personal physician who only makes 'mansion' calls, seeking to use the money to open her own exclusive practice.
- Beauregard III: Agatha's flirtatious lover, who has made a trade of swindling recently widowed women, Aunt Agatha being his greatest conquest.
- Hickory: the mansion's gardener, who would use the money to fulfill his dream of starting "Wild Hickory", a theme park based on killer plants.
- Dusty: the conniving and seductive maid, who would use the money to be a glamour model and be "dripping in pearls, emeralds and aquamarines".
- Lulu: Agatha's gossip of a best friend (in 1313 Dead End Drive, she is described as Agatha's sister), who seeks to start a supermarket gossip tabloid called Dishing the Dirt.
- Spritzy: Agatha's favourite hair stylist, who seeks to take on the world of high fashion, using the money to finance her own exquisite hair salon to the stars.
- Poopsie: Aunt Agatha's beloved, but sadistic, Persian cat, who will become one of the world's richest pets if she inherits.

=== Special spaces and rules ===
- Rolling Doubles: If a player rolls doubles that player chooses whether or not to move the current Portrait card to the back of the pack to reveal new Portrait. The player then has the choice of:
  - Moving one pawn the total number of spaces shown on the dice, or
  - Moving two pawns, one pawn for each die.
- Secret Passages: On the board are special spaces that represent "Secret Passages." Any character can enter any secret passage at any time, regardless of whether or not it is by exact roll. Moving from one secret passage to another counts as one space move for a character. Secret passages are often used to bring opponent's pawns closer to traps or to bring a player's own pawn closer to the door.
- Bluffing: Bluffing is permitted in "13 Dead End Drive." In terms of strategy, a player may move their own pieces towards or even onto trap spaces in an attempt to fool opponents. Even if that player has the matching trap card for the space their own character is on, they do not have to play it. Instead, they can pretend that they do not have the correct card and draw another one. If they happen to draw the right trap card, they can pretend that the card is the wrong one, and play continues as normal.
- Two-Player Gameplay: In case of a two player game, four character cards are dealt to each player, as well as two additional "Secret Cards." These cards must be kept face down throughout the entire game; their owners are not allowed to peek at them or even know which character they correspond to. Gameplay continues as normal, even if one player loses all four "known" character cards until one of the above "Win" scenarios occurs. In the case that neither player has the winning character in their "known" hand, they are permitted to look at the unknown cards. The player with the card that matches the winning character is declared the victor.

== International versions ==
- Danish – Tante Agathes Testamente.
- Finnish – Kalmankuja 13.
- French – La Course à l'Héritage.
- German – Agathas letzter Wille.
- Hungarian - Zsákutca 13.
- Italian – L'erede misterioso.
- Dutch – Ongelukslaan 13.
- Spanish – La herencia de tía Ágata.
- Swedish – Faster Agathas Testamente.
- Greek – Κληρονόμων 13.
- Quebecois – 13 rue Dead End Drive
- Portuguese - 13 Beco da Traição

== Spinoffs ==
=== 1313 Dead End Drive ===
1313 Dead End Drive is an updated version with 16 heirs in a mansion who are going to kill each other. The players can steal moneybags by killing rivals. There are slightly different booby traps such as the chandelier being replaced by a large boar head, the bookcase being replaced by a safe that releases a big steel piggy bank that slams into the heir's face and instead of falling into the fire you're spun into it. The game ends rather differently and the winner is the one with the most moneybags.
