= Invasion America (board wargame) =

1976 near future board wargame

Cover art by Redmond A. Simonsen, 1976

Invasion: America, subtitled "Death Throes of the Superpower", is a near-future board wargame published by SPI in 1976 that simulates a hypothetical coordinated attack on North America by various factions.

== Description ==
In this alternate history, it is the year 2000, and the United States has annexed Mexico and the states of Central America. Invasion: America is a 2–4 player corps-level wargame in which one side controls a coalition of three factions simultaneously invading North America from the Pacific, South America and Cuba, and the other side defends North America with American and Canadian forces.

=== Components ===
The game box contains:

- two-piece 35" x 46" paper hex grid map of North America scaled at 130 km (80 mi) per hex
- 400 die-cut counters
- 16-page rule book
- plastic counter tray
- two six-sided dice

=== Scenarios ===
There are six scenarios presented with the game that each last 8 turns. There is also a 60-turn campaign game.

=== Gameplay ===
The game uses the standard "I go, You go" system: one player moves all pieces desired, then the other player moves. If, after a player's movement phase, any units are adjacent to an enemy piece, combat is resolved by calculating the ratio of attacker to defender strength and rolling a die. The result is losses or a forced retreat for one or both sides.

=== Untried units ===
Invasion: America was the first wargame to use the concept of "untried units" to extend a fog of war over the map. Each militia unit has its true value printed on one side and a question mark printed on the other side. The counter is placed facedown with the question mark showing. The players do not know the strength of a unit until it is engaged and subsequently flipped over. If militia units show zero combat strength they will retreat, as will ALL other units in their stack.

=== Victory conditions ===
In each of the scenarios, control of important cities and resources results in victory points – the side with the most points at the end of the 8th turn wins. In the campaign game, the invaders must control all cities and resources by the end of the 60th turn to win; otherwise the North American side wins.

== Publication history ==
Invasion: America was designed by Jim Dunnigan, with cover art and graphics design by Redmond A. Simonsen. When it was released by SPI in early 1976, it immediately rose to No. 1 on SPI's Top Ten Bestsller List, and remained in the Top Ten for the remainder of the year.

In 1978, SPI released a larger sequel, Objective Moscow, in which the tables are turned and the Soviet Union is invaded by a coalition composed of NATO, China and Iran.

== Reception ==
In Issue 3 of Perfidious Albion, Charles Vasey was not sure to make of the game, saying, "maybe it requires more playing, but this was felt to be a very odd game ... rather a novelty item." Two issues later, Vasey and Geoff Barnard traded comments about the game. Vasey started by noting that the Americans seemed to be on the back foot throughout the game, saying, "Once ashore with a fast deployment by mechanised troops the Aggressors by means of encirclements and secondary landings could chew up the US forces. If a natural barrier i.e. the Rockies, blocked an advance, one simply swung around to the south and rolled up the defenders." Barnard replied, "Really, in this case the subject is so hypothetical as to be pointless. Apart from the one or two novelties in the rules, this game was not much of a game at all ... The game is a novelty, meant to catch the eye of the uninitiated in the US, the rules state that they have been kept as simple as possible for this very reason." Vasey concluded, "Not a game I would wish to play again, as I found it unbalanced and somewhat suspect. It does, however, teach one a lot about American geography." Barnard concluded, "The game cannot be recommended, if the subject particularly interests you, however, try to get a look, or better a play, before you spend all that money!"

In the April 1976 edition of Airfix Magazine, Bruce Quarrie called it "an intriguing fantasy game based on a set of historical hypotheses." Quarrie liked the aims of the game, saying, "The game is a particularly exciting one, with the US/Canadian player(s) having to try to repel the amphibious assaults from three directions, protect their industrial areas and so on." He concluded that the game was "a novel treatment of a familiar science fiction theme, which should have wide appeal since, in our experience, a large majority of wargamers tend also to be science fiction readers."

In his 1977 book The Comprehensive Guide to Board Wargaming, Nicholas Palmer noted, "The hypothesis is fanciful, but it gives an excellent excuse for a modern war fought over a giant multi-coloured map of the continent." Palmer liked the shorter scenarios, saying, "the scenarios have fewer turns than most complex games, so they can be played in 4–6 hours." He noted "Some problems with play balance, as the defence (realistically enough) can maintain almost permanent air superiority by basing their planes well inland." Palmer concluded "The total effect is colourful, complex, and naturally rather abstract."

In Issue 16 of The Space Gamer, Tony Van Lien commented that "For those of us who are into holocaust, Invasion: America, by Simulations Publications Inc. is the game we've been waiting for." He called the then-new "untried unit" rule "a simple and very playable system that adds greatly to the feel of the fog of war in the game." Although Van Lien liked the simplicity of the rules, he was disappointed that there was no scenario that involved an invasion force crossing the Bering Strait. He also thought the actual physical size of the map and the large number of counters might be off-putting to a new gamer. Despite these faults, Van Lien concluded on a positive note, saying, ""I:A has appeal for experienced gamers as well as newcomers. It's a truly great game."

In the inaugural issue of Ares (March 1980), Eric Goldberg liked the "beautiful" map, and commented that "for a large game, [it] plays quite well." But Goldberg found that "There are serious problems in the scenario victory conditions and some of the miscellaneous rules." He concluded by giving the game a below-average rating of 6 out of 9, saying, "the game is not one this writer would play more than once. There was enough interest in the system, however, to do a game in which the Soviet Union got the same treatment (Objective: Moscow)."

In the 1980 book The Complete Book of Wargames, game designer Jon Freeman commented, "To the basic gimmick of untried units is added the rare attraction of a modern battle fought in North America." He found the graphics to be "state of the art" and noted that the game had high potential as a solitaire game. Freeman concluded by giving an Overall Evaluation of "Very Good", calling the game "a welcome addition to the library of anyone interested in modern warfare."

In a retrospective review in Issue 11 of Simulacrum, Luc Olivier called this "a fun game to play" with simple rules, "amounting to only a few pages, standard for the period and very easy to learn." Olivier liked the components, saying, "The map is beautiful for the period." Olivier found the invasion scenarios the most interesting "because they need a real analysis about where to land for the three invaders, and what to do afterwards to get all necessary victory points to win." However, Olivier found that "after a few plays, the strategies and the game flow seem, the same; as there is no history behind them, the scenarios lose interest." Olivier concluded, "With a large map to discover and a full campaign game to play, it takes a while before boredom sets in."

== Other reviews and commentary ==
- Moves No. 61
- Fire & Movement No. 74
- The Wargamer Vol.1 No. 1
- JagdPanther No. 13
- Outposts No. 10
- Strategist No. 184 & No. 345
- Phoenix No. 7
- Panzerschreck No. 10
- Games & Puzzles #57

== See also ==
- Objective Moscow
- Fortress America – a plastic figure and area movement wargame with a similar theme.
