= Objective Moscow =

1978 Cold War board wargame

- Designers: Joe Angiolillo; Phil Kosnett
- Illustrators: Redmond Simonsen
- Publishers: SPI
- Publication: 1978
- Genres: Cold War

Objective Moscow, subtitled "The Death of Soviet Communism", is a board wargame published by Simulations Publications Inc. (SPI) in 1978 that simulates a hypothetical invasion of the U.S.S.R. in 1998 by various forces such as NATO, a united Europe, Iran, and China.

== Description ==
Objective Moscow is a complex board wargame for two or more players in which one player controls Soviet defenders while the other player or players control the invaders. The main scenario of the game is set in 1998, twenty years after the game's publication, when it was posited that the Soviet Union would have lost much of its strength and would be ripe for invasion.

=== Components ===
The game contains a 24-page rulebook, 1200 die-cut counters, as well as four 22" x 34" hex grid maps covering most of the Soviet Union, larger parts of Europe, and some parts of China.

=== Gameplay ===
The game uses an alternating system of turns, where one player moves, attacks and then gets a second movement phase for mechanized units. Then the other player gets the same opportunity.

==== Movement ====
- Basic Movement: Units are allocated movement points, and "buy" movement, with certain types of terrain costing more points per hex.
- Bonus Movement: Units that are further from the enemy move faster.
- Reaction Movement: The inactive player can move some mechanized units between the active player's attack phase and second movement phase.

==== Combat ====
In addition to attack and defense strength, each counter is marked with personnel points. Combat is resolved by using odds ratios (the ratio of attacking strength to defending strength), modified by terrain factors. If an exchange is indicated, the force with the fewest personnel points is eliminated, and the other force's personnel points are reduced by the same amount. (Some units with zero personnel points are eliminated in exchanges, with no loss of personnel for the other side.)

All Russian and Chinese units are "untried" at the start of the game — they start the game flipped over so that neither player knows each unit's attack and defense strength. It is only when the unit is engaged in combat that it is flipped over to reveal its strength.

==== Air support ====
Both sides can use aircraft for combat support, and also to intercept enemy aircraft.

==== Other rules ====
In addition to conventional combat, the game includes rules for tactical nuclear warfare, Japanese samurai units, cruise missiles, American space marines who can drop down from orbiting space stations, and the collapse of the Warsaw Pact.

=== Scenarios ===
The game comes with several scenarios involving up to thirty nations. Three shorter scenarios only involve one invading force: a NATO offensive after a failed Soviet strike on West Germany; a Chinese incursion into Siberia; and an expansion into Soviet territory by Iran. Each of these scenarios only uses a single map, and are all set when the game was published in the late 1970s.

A longer scenario involving more invaders and using all four maps is also set in the 1970s. Only the campaign game, which also uses all four maps and combines several forces attacking from several fronts, is set twenty years in the future (in 1998).

== Publication history ==
In 1976, SPI published Invasion: America, a hypothetical invasion of North America by Soviet and other forces. Two years later, Joe Angiolillo and Phil Kosnett designed Objective Moscow, a sequel that flipped the roles of invader and defender. It was published in 1978 as a boxed set with graphic design by Redmond A. Simonsen.

== Reception ==
In his 1977 book The Comprehensive Guide to Board Wargaming, Nicky Palmer was not impressed with either Operation Moscow or its predecessor Invasion America, calling them "more notable for size than subtlety." Palmer did think that Operation Moscow "seems to offer greater scope to strategists." He did note that "Both games gloss over the little matter of mutual nuclear annihilation, and are therefore (fortunately) pretty theoretical — but the maps and the units are interestingly varied."

In Issue 33 of the British wargaming magazine Perfidious Albion, Roger Sandell admired the four-panel map, but noted a number of errors including the placement of Dresden in Czechoslovakia, and the lack of a border between Russia and Turkey. Sandell found the game system to be "simple and easy to handle." Sandell felt the strength of the game came from "the widely separated fronts and the different types of warfare going on in each." However, Sandell felt that the victory conditions on the Chinese front seemed unbalanced against Chinese forces. Sandell concluded, "Is it worth buying? Not if you think of getting much mileage out of the one-map scenarios. The contemporary game has problems as a simulation and is generally too much like hard work for me ... However, the 1998 scenario certainly seems fun, challenging and playable by big game standards and I would personally recommend Objective Moscow on the basis of this one scenario."

Rick Mataka, writing in the June 1979 issue of Craft, Model, and Hobby Industry Magazine, called it "a large game that is not overly complex as the rules are kept fairly simple." Mataka concluded, "Highly playable game system, it can be recommended for beginners with limited experience in board gaming."

In Issue 40 of Moves, Scott Renner was not pleased with this game. He found that once the large numbers of counters were placed on the map, it became terribly cluttered. He also found many significant errors in the map, such as placing the German city of Dresden in Czechoslovakia. Although Renner liked the cruise missile rules, he found "The Samurai divisions are a less credible invention of the game," and then noted "Nothing could make the Samurai divisions more believable than a glance through the rules covering the Space Marines." But Renner's principle complaint was that four of the five scenarios were set in the late 1970s, pointing out "The game was billed as a simulation of the invasion of Russia in 1998, yet the 1998 scenario looks like it was added as an afterthought." Brenner concluded, "Objective Moscow is not a bad game. It isn't a classic, either - a pity, since I think it could have been one. In a few years, Objective Moscow will be remembered as just another game published by Simulations Publications, Inc. in 1978. Frankly, I had hoped for more."

In The Guide to Simulations/Games for Education and Training, Richard Rydzel called this "An interesting but unwieldy game. Air units, for example, must return to the exact base they left before combat. But with a total of thirty to fifty plane counters, it is difficult to remember where each started." Rydzel also thought the game was unbalanced, noting "The game also seems biased in favor of the U.S. alliance in the representation of strengths of the counters."

In the June 1981 issue of the Italian games magazine Pergioco, Marco Donadoni warned that players would experience "very high losses in combat, even higher than any other historical period, due to the potential of modern weapons (which, obviously, are expected to be even more deadly in the next twenty years)." Donadoni also questioned the rules limiting nuclear weapons to battlefield tactical uses, pointing out "But who can say what the Kremlin would really do in the face of such an influx of 'visitors' not regulated by the state tourism agency?"

In Issue 23 of the British wargaming magazine Phoenix, A.J. Sarker warned, "Objective Moscow is not a game for the inexperienced wargamer as it is the ability to plan one's moves ahead that will win the game." Sarker concluded, "OM is worth buying for those who collect big games and can afford its price. For those who prefer small games, the one-map scenarios are almost as enjoyable to play as the campaign games."

== Awards ==
At the 1979 Origins Awards, Operation Moscow was a finalist for the Charles S. Roberts Award for "Best Fantasy/Futuristic Board Game of 1978".

== Other reviews and commentary ==
- Fire & Movement #15
- Ann Arbor Wargamer #19
