= Ost (game) =

Ost is a 1986 board game published by Les Elfes.

== Gameplay ==
Ost is a game in which a two-player medieval miniature wargame has armies maneuver on randomized terrain, issue and modify orders through leaders, and resolve simultaneous combat with rules for morale, unit types, and victory points.

== Reviews ==
- Casus Belli #32
- Jeux & Stratégie #40
