= Shogun (1986 board game) =

Feudal Japan-theme board game

- Other names: Samurai Swords; Ikusa
- Designers: Michael Gray
- Illustrators: Steve Argyle
- Publishers: Milton Bradley
- Publication: 1986; 40 years ago
- Genres: Board wargame
- Players: 2–5
- Playing time: 240'–360'
- Age range: 12+

Shogun is a board wargame set in feudal Japan, first released in 1986 by game maker Milton Bradley.

== Publication history ==
Shogun, designed by Michael Gray, was first released in 1986 by Milton Bradley as part of their Gamemaster series. It was renamed to Samurai Swords in its first re-release (1995) to disambiguate it from other games with the same name (in particular, James Clavell's Shogun, a wargame with a similar theme, released in 1983), and renamed again to Ikusa in its 2011 re-release under Hasbro's Avalon Hill banner. For the 40th Anniversary Edition (2026), the game is being released a 4th time by Avalon Hill and Renegade Games Studios. It will also be renamed, Ikusa: Samurai Swords.

== Gameplay ==
Set in feudal Japan, two to five players take control of a fictional warlord and pit their armies against one another in hopes of winning the title Shogun.

Each player controls a number of daimyō, or generals, who command an army. Other forces on the board represent militia and garrisons. Players have the option of hiring ronin (mercenaries). There is a ninja, principally used as an assassin against enemy daimyō. Units include samurai swordsmen and bowmen, and ashigaru spearmen and gunners.

Income, called koku, is derived from control of territories. Players attempt to destroy their rivals in battle and seize their territories. Some interesting features include the orchestration of armies in battle, the emphasis on generals (who gain levels, much like roleplaying game characters), and the unpredictable element of ronin placement.

The game uses six twelve-sided dice. The trays for units are designed to resemble Japanese fortresses, and each player receives a small katana (to display the order in which players take their turns).

== Reception ==
Shogun was awarded the Origins Award for "Best Pre-20th Century Boardgame of 1987" and "Best Graphic Presentation of a Boardgame of 1987".

David M. Ewalt of Forbes commented on the 2011 release of Ikusa: "The game formerly known as Samurai Swords (and before that as Shogun) gets another makeover. Still the same strategy classic where players compete to rule feudal Japan, but the box, board and pieces have been updated. Not cheap, but the redesign looks great and the game’s as fun as ever."

In a review of the game as Ikusa in Black Gate, Scott Taylor said "Truly, it's a fantastic game, and that's the reason it's been around so long and still maintains viability. As for the newest version, I'd say it carries much the same properties as its predecessors, with beautifully updated art by Steve Argyle and Gonzalo Flores. A single knock on this version is the change from hard plastic play pieces to soft plastic, some of the bases becoming warped in packaging. Still, I'd give Ikusa four stars out of five and highly recommend picking it up for anyone who loves strategic warfare games."

== Reviews ==
- Backstab #4
- Isaac Asimov's Science Fiction Magazine v12 n8 (1988 08)
- Best Games of 1988 in Games #94
