= Milton Bradley Company =

American board game company

Milton Bradley/MB
- Logo used since 1997
- Formerly: Milton Bradley Company (1860–1998)
- Type: Brand
- Industry: Games
- Founded: September 14, 1860; 166 years ago, in Springfield, Massachusetts
- Founder: Milton Bradley
- Defunct: March 19, 1998; 28 years ago (as a company)
- Fate: Purchased by Hasbro in 1984; merged with Parker Brothers and reincorporated as "Hasbro Games" in 1998; remained as a brand until 2009
- Successor: Hasbro Gaming
- Headquarters: United States
- Products: Board games; Card games; Electronic games; Jigsaw puzzles; Papers; Crayons
- Brands: Scrabble (in North America); Simon; Yahtzee
- Owner: Hasbro
- Subsidiaries: McLoughlin Brothers

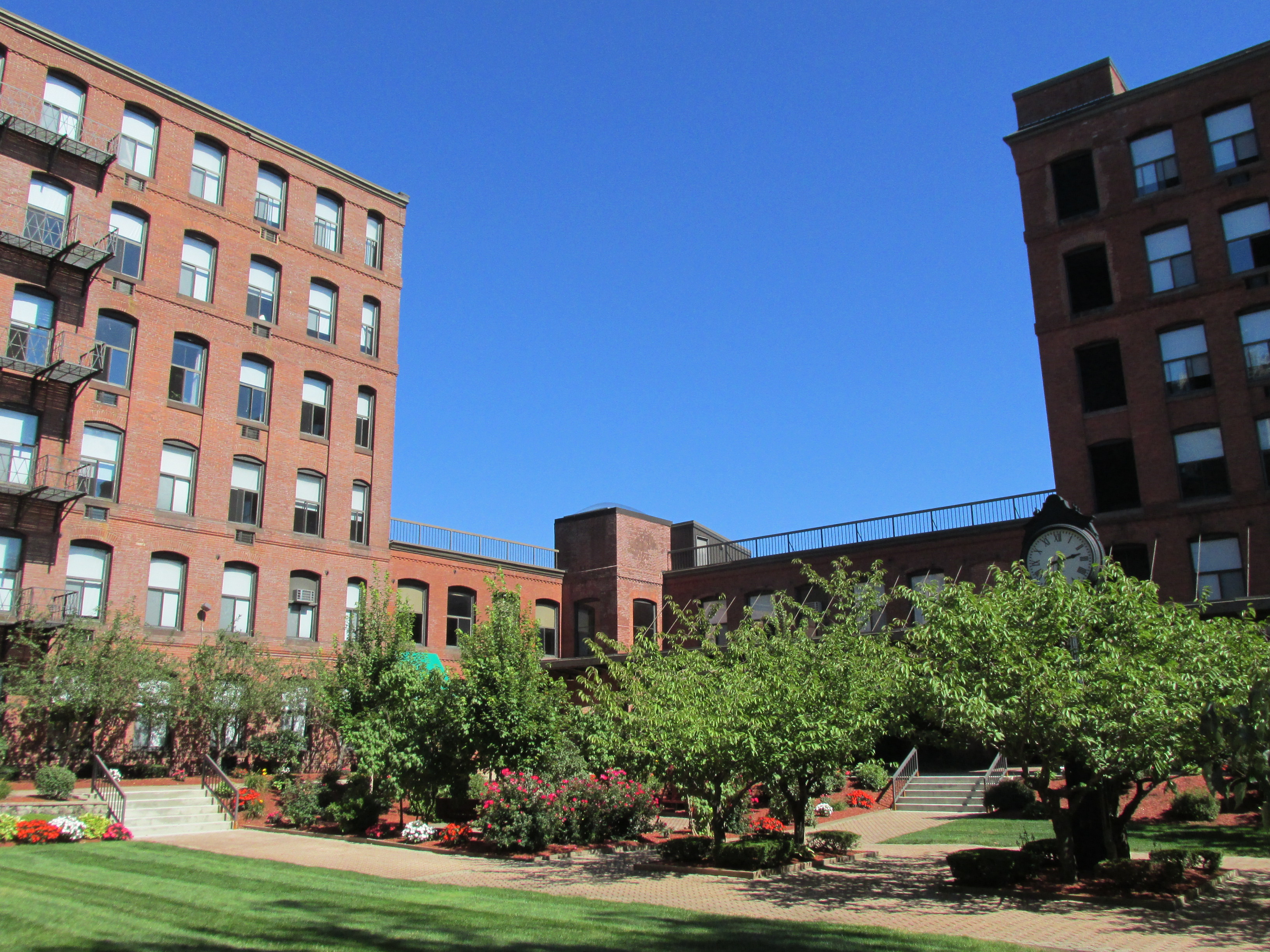
Former headquarters at the Milton Bradley building in East Longmeadow, Massachusetts used until 1998. Hasbro would continue to use the factory until 2015 when it was sold to Cartamundi Group.

Milton Bradley, branded internationally as MB, was an American board game manufacturer that was established by Milton Bradley (1836–1911) in Springfield, Massachusetts, in 1860. In 1920, it absorbed the game production of McLoughlin Brothers, formerly the largest game manufacturer in the United States. It was acquired by Hasbro in 1984, and merged with Hasbro subsidiary Parker Brothers in 1998. The brand name continued to be used by Hasbro until 2009.

== History ==
=== Foundation ===
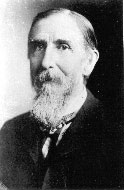
Milton Bradley, founder

Milton Bradley found success making board games. In 1860, Milton Bradley moved to Springfield, Massachusetts, and set up the state's first color lithography shop. Its graphic design of Abraham Lincoln sold well, until Lincoln grew his beard and rendered the likeness out-of-date.

Struggling to find a new way to use his lithography machine, Bradley visited his friend George Tapley. Tapley challenged him to a game, most likely an old English game. Bradley conceived the idea of making a purely American game. He created The Checkered Game of Life, which had players move along a track from Infancy to Happy Old Age, in which the point was to avoid Ruin and reach Happy Old Age. Squares were labeled with moral positions from honor and bravery to disgrace and ruin. Players used a spinner instead of dice because of the negative association with gambling.

By spring of 1861, over 45,000 copies of The Checkered Game of Life had been sold. Bradley became convinced board games were his company's future.

When the American Civil War broke out in early 1861, Milton Bradley temporarily gave up making board games and tried to make new weaponry. However, upon seeing bored soldiers stationed in Springfield, Bradley began producing small games which the soldiers could play during their down time. These are regarded as the first travel games in the country. These games included chess, checkers, backgammon, dominoes, and "The Checkered Game of Life". They were sold for one dollar a piece to soldiers and charitable organizations, which bought them in bulk to distribute.

=== Kindergarten movement ===
The Milton Bradley Company took a new direction in 1869 after Milton Bradley went to hear a lecture about the kindergarten movement by early education pioneer, Elizabeth Peabody. Peabody promoted the philosophy of the German scholar Friedrich Froebel. Froebel believed and advocated that children learn and develop through creative activities. Bradley would spend much of the rest of his life promoting the kindergarten movement both personally and through the Milton Bradley Company.

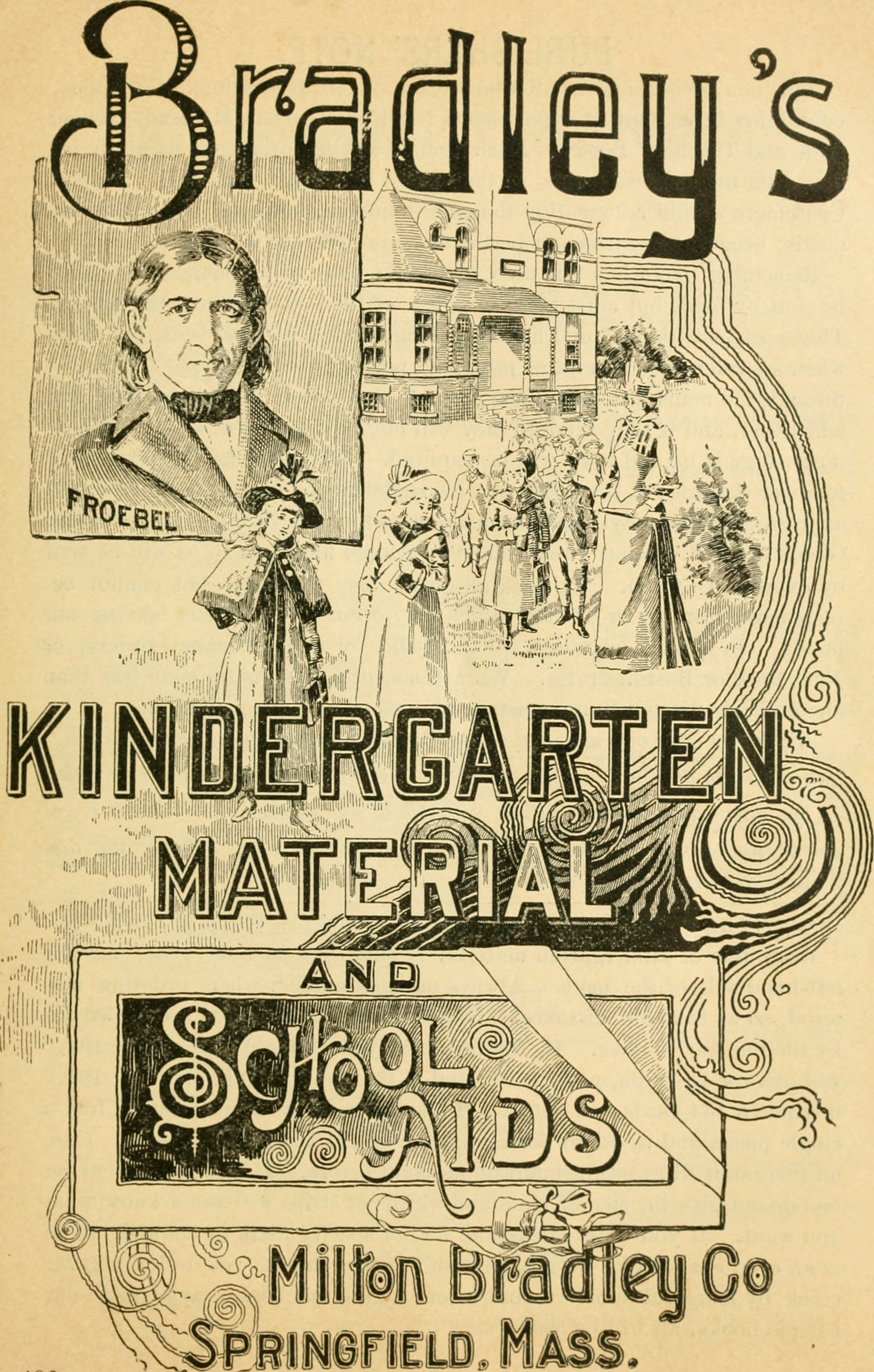
Bradley's kindergarten material and school aids, 1896

In the late 1860s, Bradley became involved in the kindergarten movement. Deeply invested in the cause, his company began manufacturing educational items such as colored papers and paints. The company was hurt by Bradley's generosity as he gave these materials away free of charge. Due to the Long Depression of the late 1870s, his investors told him either his kindergarten work must go or they would go. Bradley chose to keep his kindergarten work. His friend George Tapley bought the interest of the lost investors and took over as president of the Milton Bradley Company.

Springfield's first kindergarten students were Milton Bradley's two daughters, and the first teachers in Springfield were Milton, his wife, and his father. Milton Bradley's company's involvement with kindergartens began with the production of "gifts", the term used by Froebel for the geometric wooden play things that he felt were necessary to properly structure children's creative development. Bradley spent months devising the exact shades in which to produce these materials; his final choice of six pigments of red, orange, yellow, green, blue, and violet would remain the standard colors for children's art supplies through the 20th century.

By the 1870s, the company was producing dozens of games and capitalizing on fads. Milton Bradley became the first manufacturer in America to make croquet sets. The sets included wickets, mallets, balls, stakes, and an authoritative set of rules to play by that Bradley himself had created from oral tradition and his own sense of fair play. In 1880, the company began making jigsaw puzzles.

The company's educational supplies turned out to be a large portion of their income at the turn of the century. The company produced supplies that any grade school teacher could use, such as toy money, multiplication sticks, and movable clock dials. Milton Bradley continued producing games, particularly parlor games played by adults. These included Visit to the Gypsies, Word Gardening, Happy Days in Old New England, and Fortune Telling. The company also created jigsaw puzzles of wrecked vehicles, which were popular among young boys.

=== Later years ===
When Milton Bradley died in 1911, the company was passed to Robert Ellis, who passed it to Bradley's son-in-law Robert Ingersoll, who eventually passed it to George Tapley's son, William. In 1920, Bradley bought out McLoughlin Brothers, which went out of business after John McLoughlin's death.

Milton Bradley began to decline in the 1920s and fell dramatically in the 1930s during the Great Depression. Fewer people were spending money on board games. The company kept losing money until 1940, when they sank too low and banks demanded payment on loans.

Desperate to avoid bankruptcy, the board of directors persuaded James J. Shea, a Springfield businessman, to take over presidency of the company. Shea immediately moved to decrease the company's debt. He began a major renovation of the Milton Bradley plant by burning old inventory that had been accumulating since the turn of the century.

With the outbreak of World War II, Milton Bradley started producing a universal joint created by Shea used on the landing gear of fighter planes. They also reproduced a revised version of their game kits for soldiers, which earned the company $2 million. Milton Bradley did not stop creating board games, although they did cut their line from 410 titles to 150. New games were introduced during this time, such as the patriotic Game of the States, Chutes & Ladders, and Candyland.

The advent of the television could have threatened the industry, but Shea used it to his advantage. Various companies acquired licenses to television shows for the purpose of producing all manner of promotional items including games. In 1959, Milton Bradley released Concentration, a memory game based on an NBC television show of the same name; the game was such a success that editions were issued annually into 1982, long after the show was cancelled in 1973 (similar practices were used for box game adaptations of the game shows Password and Jeopardy!).

Milton Bradley celebrated their centennial in 1960 with the re-release of The Checkered Game of Life, which was modernized. It was now simply called The Game of Life and the goal was no longer to reach Happy Old Age, but to become a millionaire. Twister made its debut in the 1960s as well. Thanks to Johnny Carson's suggestive comments as Eva Gabor played the game on his show, Twister became a phenomenon. In the 1960s, Milton Bradley games were licensed in Australia by John Sands Pty Ltd.

In 1967, James Shea Jr. took over as president of Milton Bradley (becoming CEO in 1968) succeeding his father. During his presidency, Milton Bradley bought Playskool Mfg. Co. and the E.S. Lowe Company, makers of Yahtzee, and Body Language. In the late 1960s, the company moved its manufacturing from its Springfield plant to a newly-built, 1,100,000-square-foot manufacturing facility in East Longmeadow, Massachusetts.

During the 1970s and 1980s, electronic games became popular. Milton Bradley released Simon in 1978, which was fairly late in the movement. By 1980, it was their best-selling item.

In 1979, Milton Bradley also developed the first hand-held cartridge-based console, the Microvision.

In 1983, seeing the potential in the new Vectrex vector-based video game console, the company purchased General Consumer Electronics (GCE). Both the Vectrex and the Microvision were designed by Jay Smith.

During the late 1980s and early 1990s, Milton Bradley marketed a series of games (such as HeroQuest and Battle Masters) in North America that were developed in the United Kingdom by Games Workshop (GW) that drew heavily from GW's Warhammer Fantasy universe, albeit without explicit reference to the Warhammer product line.

=== Hasbro ownership ===
In 1984, Hasbro bought out Milton Bradley, ending 124 years of family ownership. The 1990s saw the release of Gator Golf, Crack the Case, Mall Madness, and 1313 Dead End Drive.

In 1991, Hasbro acquired Tonka, which included Parker Brothers. In 1998, Milton Bradley merged with Parker Brothers to form Hasbro Games. After the consolidation, Milton Bradley and Parker Brothers turned into brands of Hasbro before being dropped in 2009 in favor of the parent company's name, since adjusted to Hasbro Gaming.

== Games published ==
Some of the games published by Milton Bradley were:

=== Board / card games ===
- 13 Dead End Drive
- Axis & Allies
- Battle Cry
- Battleship
- Broadsides and Boarding Parties
- The Checkered Game of Life
- Connect Four
- Conquest of the Empire
- Crossfire
- Ea$y Money
- Fireball Island
- Fortress America
- HeroQuest
- Hungry Hungry Hippos
- Mall Madness
- Go For Broke
- Operation
- Scrabble (Note: Commercialised along with Parker Brothers, only in the United States and Canada.)
- Shogun
- Snakes and ladders
- Yahtzee

=== Electronic games ===
- Microvision (Note: Produced by the "Milton Bradley Electronics" division.)
- OMNI
- Simon

=== Other games ===
- Jenga
- Knockout
- Twister

=== Toys ===
- Mr. Bucket
- Buffalo Bill Gun

== Gallery ==
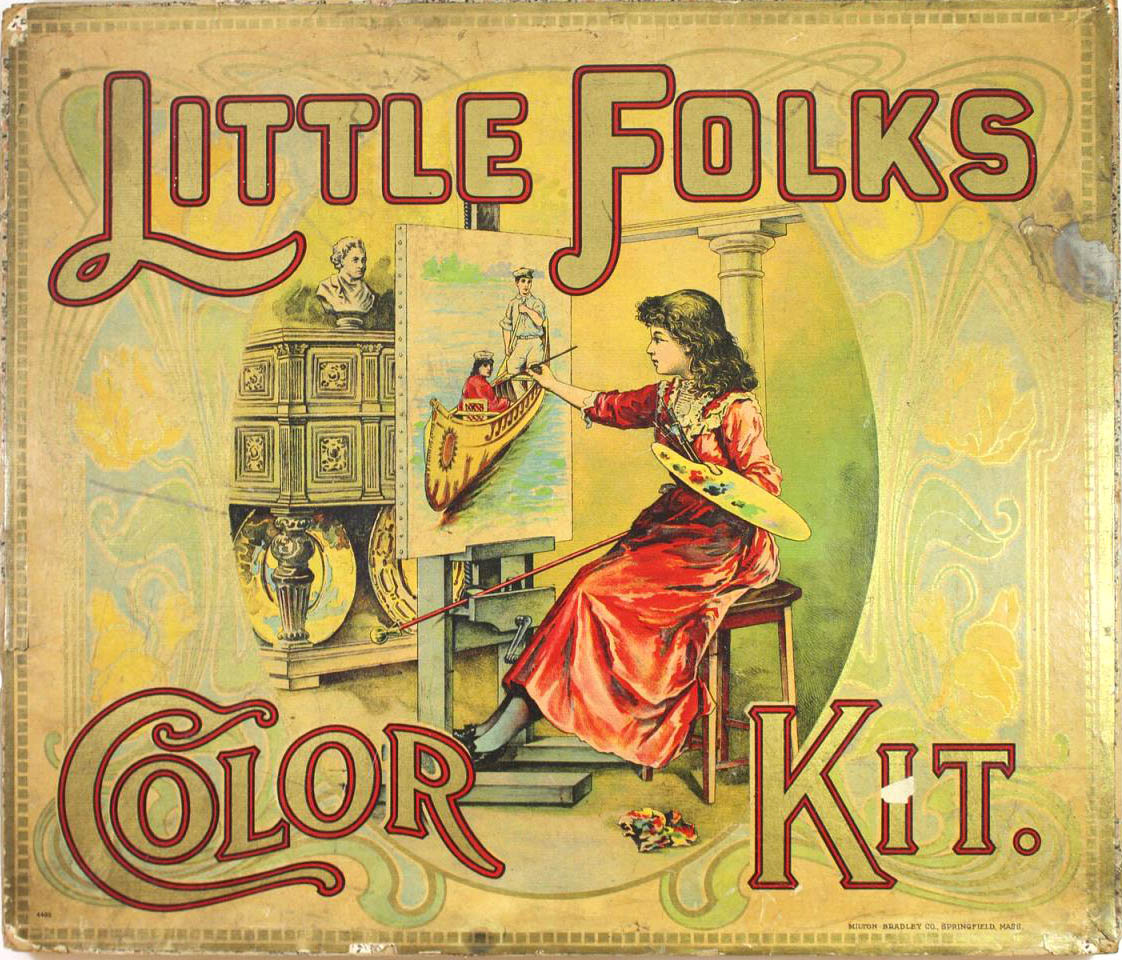
Little Folks paints

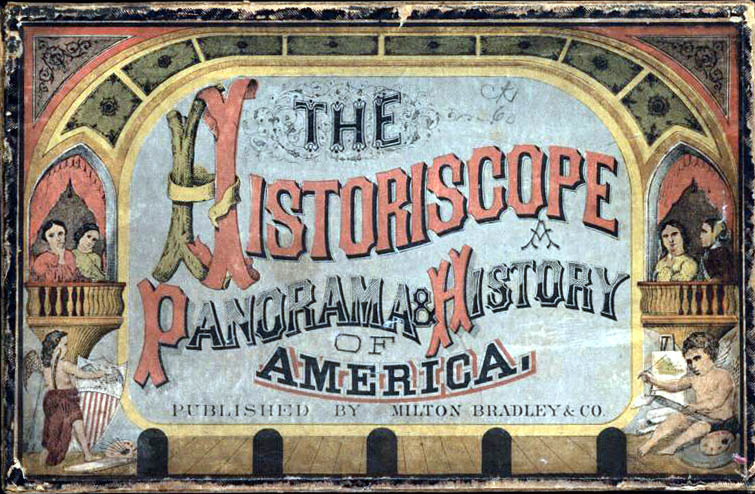
Historicscope

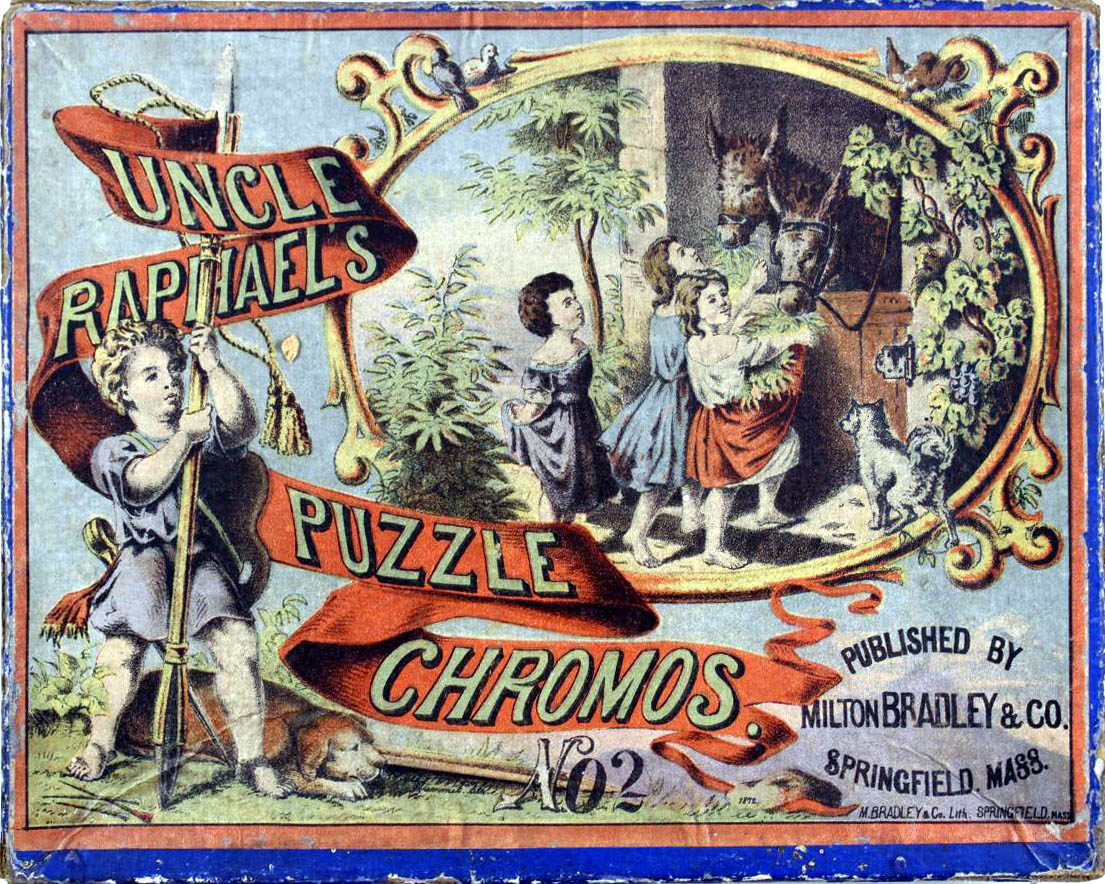
Mr. Uncle Raphael puzzle

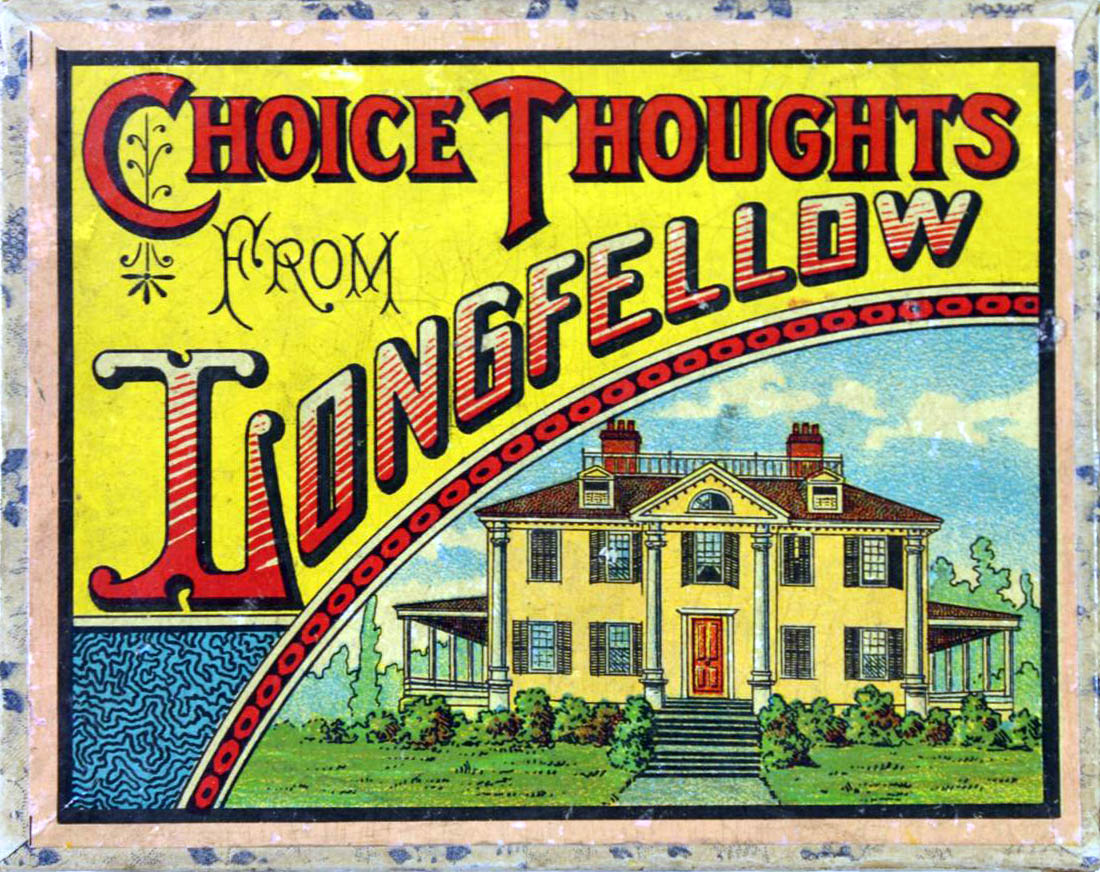
Choice Thoughts

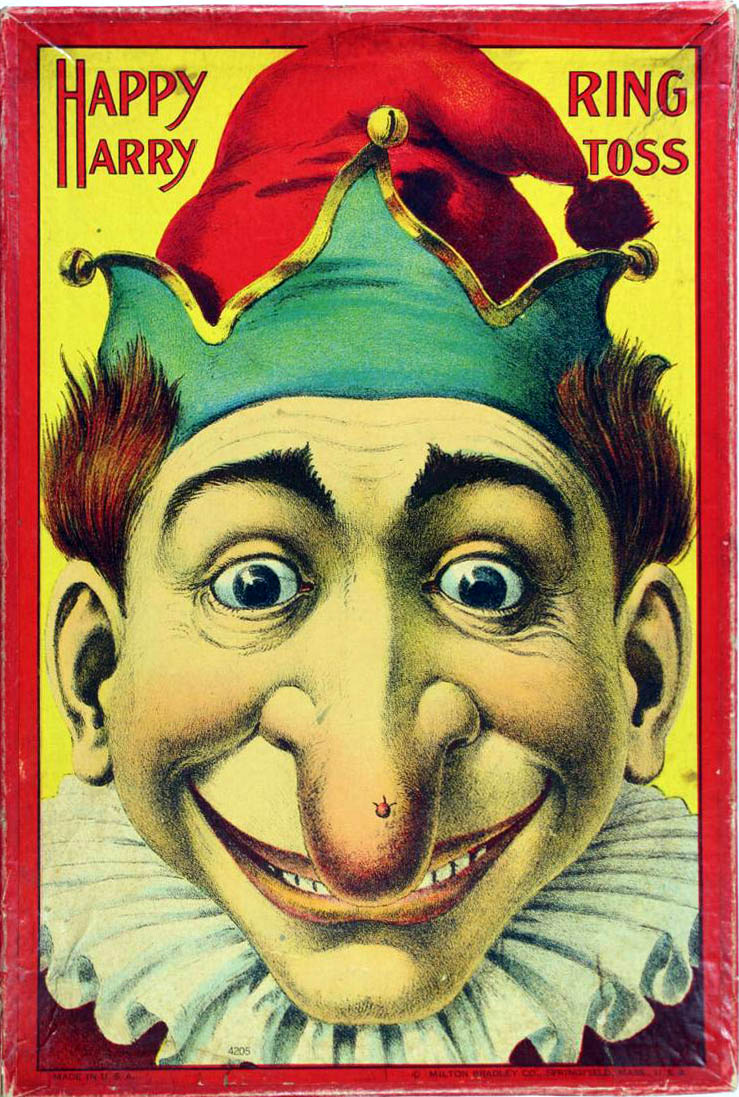
Happy Harry

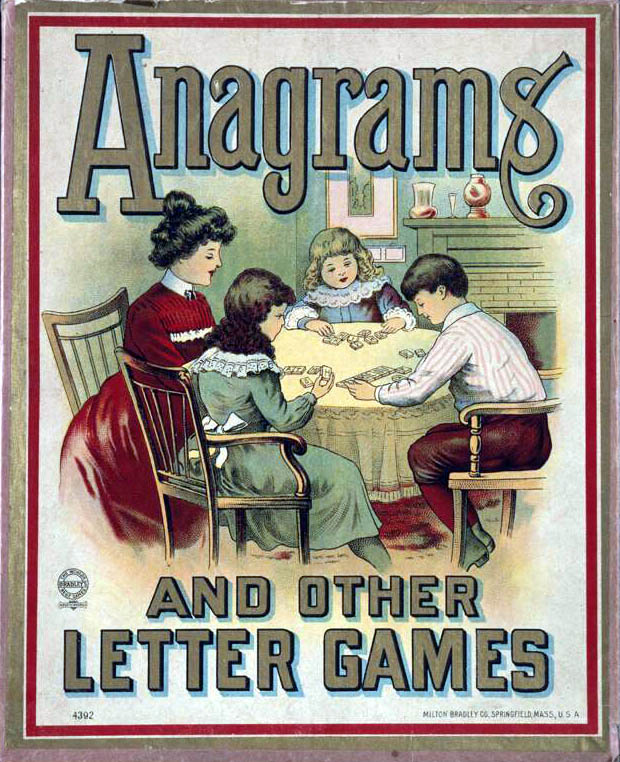
Anagrams

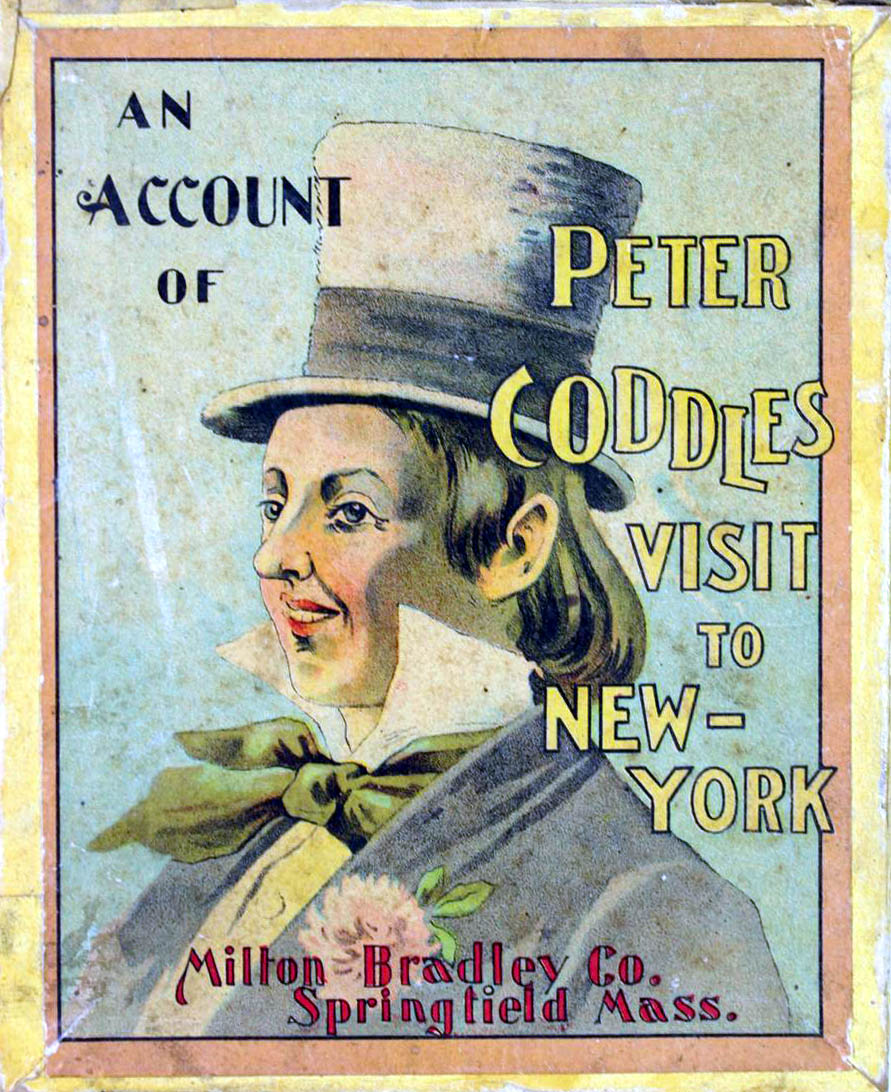
Peter Coddles

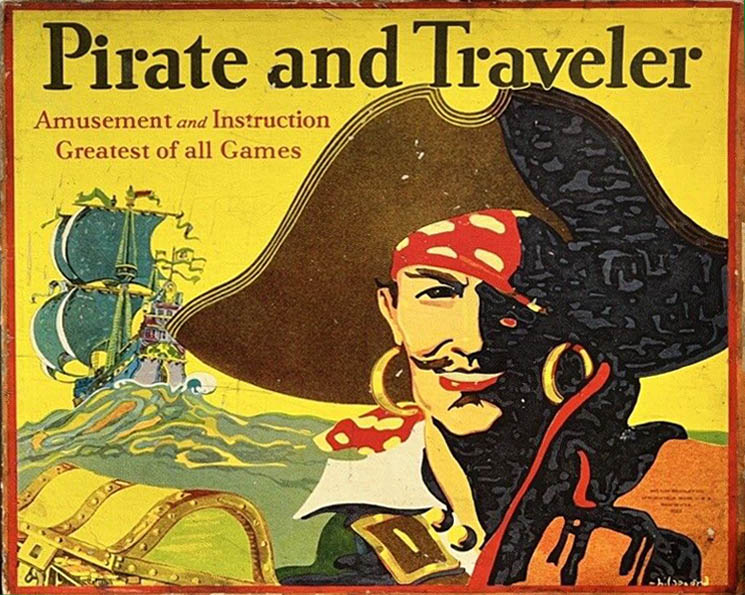
Pirate and Traveler

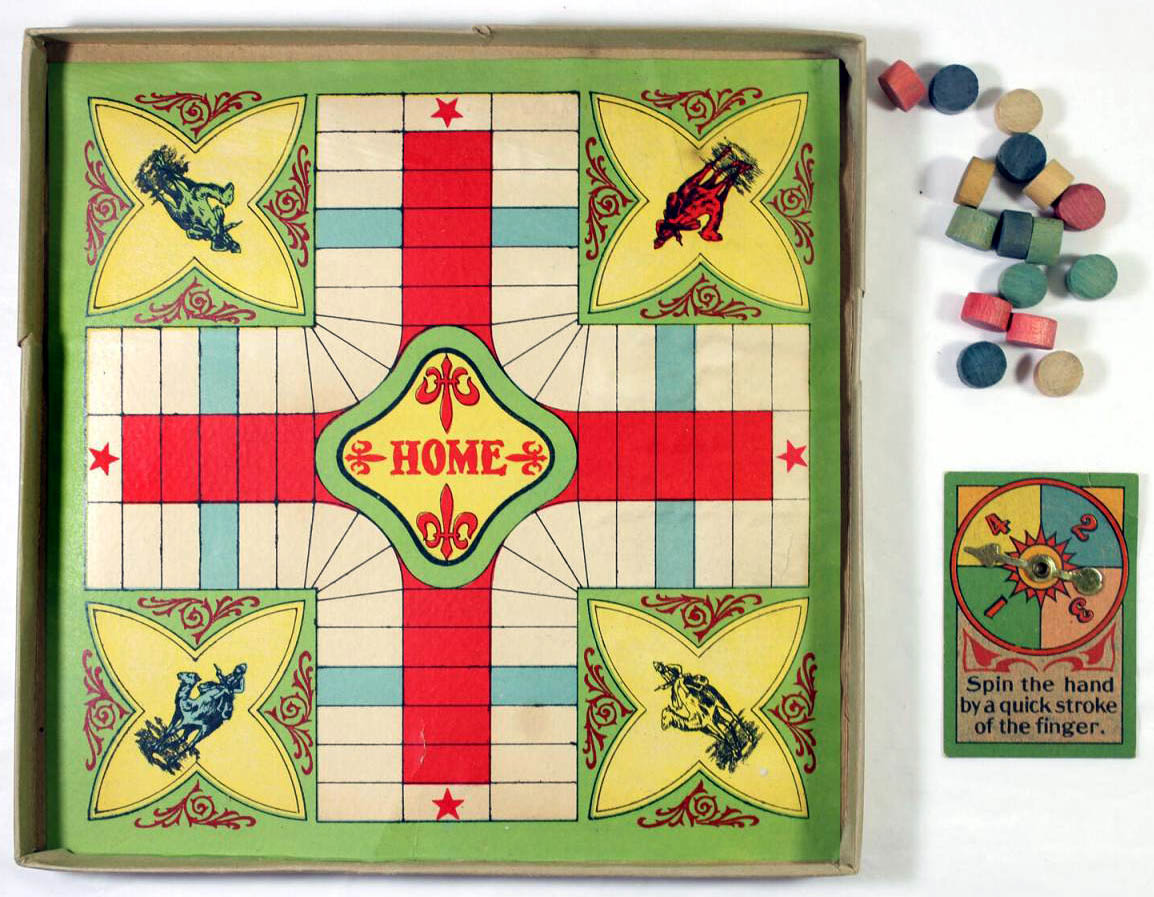
Game of India board

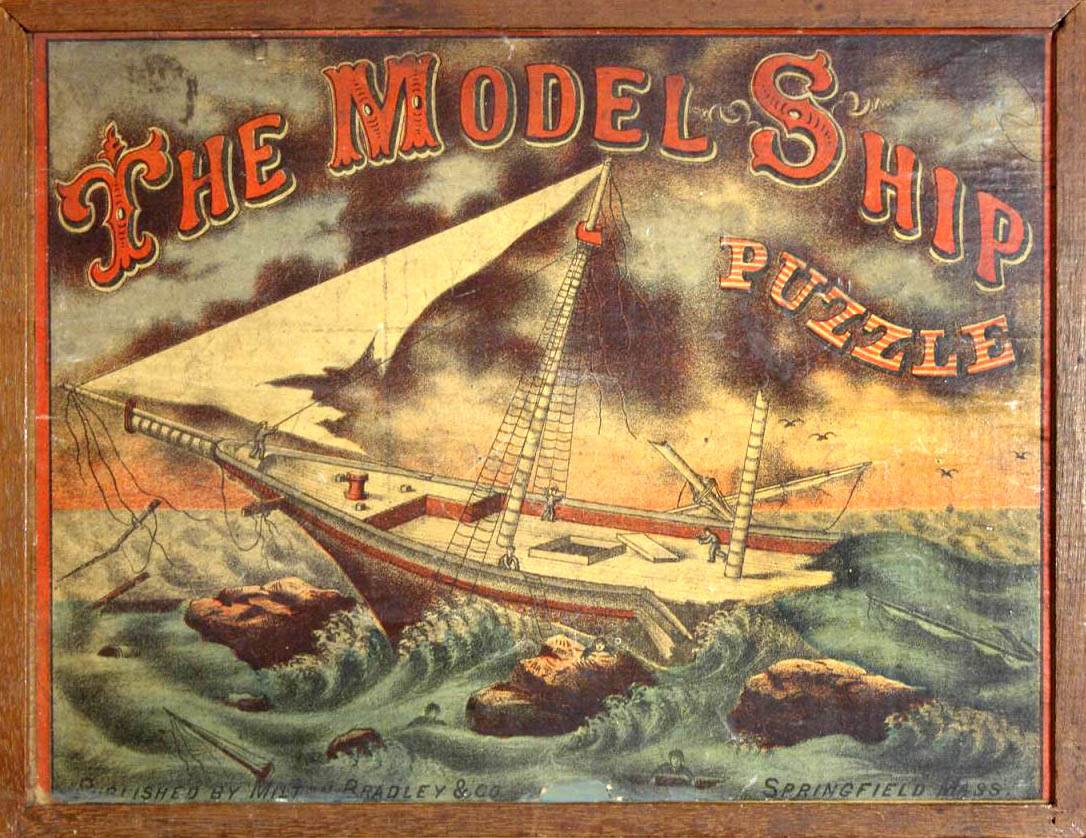
Model Ship puzzle

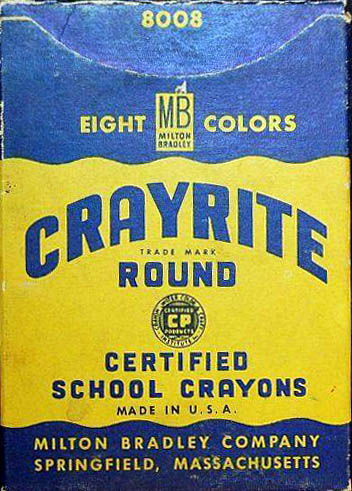
Crayrite crayons
