= Burt Meyer =

American inventor (1926–2025)

Burton Carpenter Meyer (April 18, 1926 – October 30, 2025) was an American inventor. He invented or co-invented a number of successful toys and board games including Rock 'Em Sock 'Em Robots, Lite-Brite, and Mouse Trap.

== Life and career ==
Meyer was born in Hinsdale, Illinois, on April 18, 1926. His father, John, was a pharmacist, and his mother, Esther (née Carpenter), was a homemaker. He served as an aircraft mechanic for the U.S. Navy from 1944 to 1946. He attended West Georgia College (now the University of West Georgia) before moving to Chicago. He graduated from the Institute of Design at the Illinois Institute of Technology with a bachelor's degree in product design in 1952. He was hired as a design director and teacher at the Atlanta Art Institute. He then started designing trade show displays, cabinets, and jukeboxes.

Around 1960, Meyer was hired at the toy firm Marvin Glass & Associates, where he worked on projects including Rock 'Em Sock 'Em Robots, Lite-Brite, Mouse Trap, Toss Across, and Mr. Machine. He left the company in the mid-1980s and, after a period of retirement, started his own firm, Meyer/Glass Design, creating toys and games such as Pretty Pretty Princess, Catch Phrase, and Gooey Louie.

Meyer died in Burr Ridge, Illinois, on October 30, 2025, at the age of 99.
