= Inchworm (disambiguation) =

An inchworm is the caterpillar of a Geometer moth.

Inchworm may also refer to:

- "Inchworm" (song), a song from the film Hans Christian Andersen
- Inchworm (toy), a ride-on toy manufactured by Hasbro in the 1970s
- Inchworm motor, an electric motor patented by EXFO
