= Piezoelectric motor =

Type of electric motor

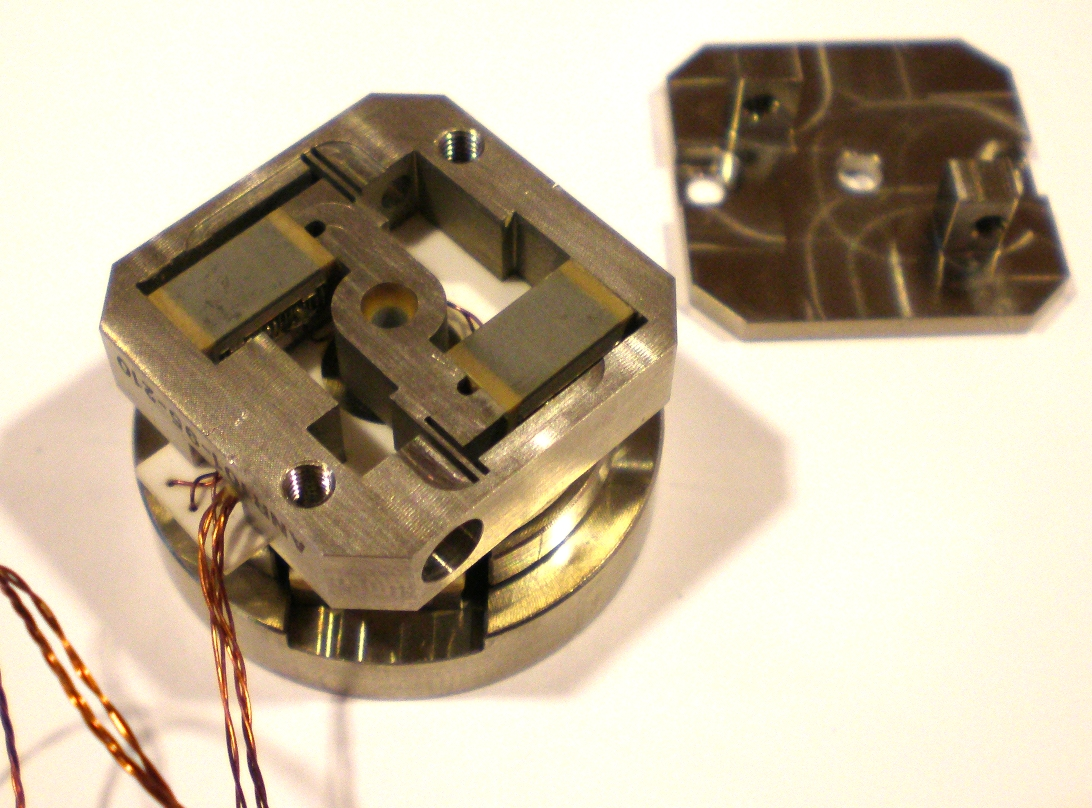
Insides of a slip-stick piezoelectric motor. Two piezoelectric crystals are visible that provide the mechanical torque.

A piezoelectric motor or piezo motor is a type of electric motor based on the change in shape of a piezoelectric material when an electric field is applied, as a consequence of the converse piezoelectric effect. An electrical circuit makes acoustic or ultrasonic vibrations in the piezoelectric material, most often lead zirconate titanate and occasionally lithium niobate or other single-crystal materials, which can produce linear or rotary motion depending on their mechanism. Examples of types of piezoelectric motors include inchworm motors, stepper and slip-stick motors as well as ultrasonic motors which can be further categorized into standing wave and travelling wave motors. Piezoelectric motors typically use a cyclic stepping motion, which allows the oscillation of the crystals to produce an arbitrarily large motion, as opposed to most other piezoelectric actuators where the range of motion is limited by the static strain that may be induced in the piezoelectric element.

The growth and forming of piezoelectric crystals is a well-developed industry, yielding very uniform and consistent distortion for a given applied potential difference. This, combined with the minute scale of the distortions, gives the piezoelectric motor the ability to make very fine steps. Manufacturers claim precision to the nanometer scale. High response rate and fast distortion of the crystals also let the steps happen at very high frequencies—upwards of 5 MHz. This provides a maximum linear speed of approximately 800 mm per second, or nearly 2.9 km/h.

A unique capability of piezoelectric motors is their ability to operate in strong magnetic fields. This extends their usefulness to applications that cannot use traditional electromagnetic motors—such as inside nuclear magnetic resonance antennas. The maximum operating temperature is limited by the Curie temperature of the used piezoelectric ceramic and can exceed +250 °C.

The main benefits of piezoelectric motors are the high positioning precision, stability of position while unpowered, and the ability to be fabricated at very small sizes or in unusual shapes such as thin rings. Common applications of piezoelectric motors include focusing systems in camera lenses as well as precision motion control in specialised applications such as microscopy.

== Resonant motor types ==
=== Ultrasonic motor ===
Ultrasonic motors differ from other piezoelectric motors in several ways, though both typically use some form of piezoelectric material. The most obvious difference is the use of resonance to amplify the vibration of the stator in contact with the rotor in ultrasonic motors.

Two different ways are generally available to control the friction along the stator-rotor contact interface, traveling-wave vibration and standing-wave vibration. Some of the earliest versions of practical motors in the 1970s, by Sashida, for example, used standing-wave vibration in combination with fins placed at an angle to the contact surface to form a motor, albeit one that rotated in a single direction. Later designs by Sashida and researchers at Matsushita, ALPS, Xeryon and Canon made use of traveling-wave vibration to obtain bi-directional motion, and found that this arrangement offered better efficiency and less contact interface wear. An exceptionally high-torque 'hybrid transducer' ultrasonic motor uses circumferentially-poled and axially-poled piezoelectric elements together to combine axial and torsional vibration along the contact interface, representing a driving technique that lies somewhere between the standing and traveling-wave driving methods.

== Non-resonant motor types ==
=== Inchworm motor ===
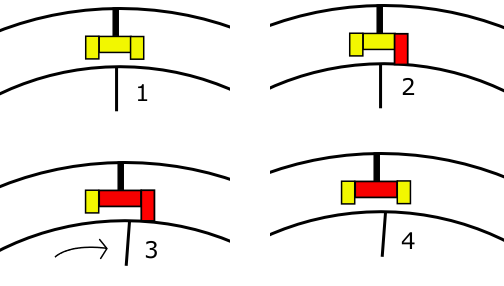
Fig. 1: Stepping stages of 'Normally Free' motor

The inchworm motor uses piezoelectric ceramics to push a stator using a walking-type motion. These piezoelectric motors use three groups of crystals—two 'locking', and one 'motive' that permanently connects to either the motor's casing or stator (not both). The motive group, sandwiched between the other two, provides the motion.

The non-powered behaviour of this piezoelectric motor is one of two options: 'normally locked' or 'normally free'. A normally free type allows free movement when unpowered but can still be locked by applying a voltage.

Inchworm motors can achieve nanometre-scale positioning by varying the voltage applied to the motive crystal while one set of locking crystals is engaged.

==== Stepping actions ====
Piezoelectric "inchworm" motor

The actuation process of the inchworm motor is a multistep cyclical process:

1. First, one group of 'locking' crystals is activated to lock one side and unlock other side of the 'sandwich' of piezo crystals.
2. Next, the 'motive' crystal group is triggered and held. The expansion of this group moves the unlocked 'locking' group along the motor path. This is the only stage where the motor moves.
3. Then the 'locking' group triggered in stage one releases (in 'normally locking' motors, in the other it triggers).
4. Then the 'motive' group releases, retracting the 'trailing locking' group.
5. Finally, both 'locking' groups return to their default states.

=== Stepper or walk-drive motor ===
Bimorph cantilevers used in stepper or walk drive motor.

Not to be confused with the similarly named electromagnetic stepper motor, these motors are similar to the inchworm motor, however, the piezoelectric elements can be bimorph actuators which bend to feed the slider rather than using a separate expanding and contracting element.

=== Slip-stick motor ===
A slip-stick actuator.

The mechanism of slip-stick motors rely on the inertia in combination with the difference between static and dynamic friction. The stepping action consists of a slow extension phase where static friction is not overcome, followed by a rapid contraction phase where static friction is overcome and the point of contact between the motor and moving part is changed.

=== Direct drive motors ===
The direct drive piezoelectric motor creates movement through continuous ultrasonic vibration. Its control circuit applies a two-channel sinusoidal or square wave to the piezoelectric elements that matches the bending resonant frequency of the threaded tube—typically an ultrasonic frequency of 40 kHz to 200 kHz. This creates orbital motion that drives the screw.

A second drive type, the squiggle motor, uses piezoelectric elements bonded orthogonally to a nut. Their ultrasonic vibrations rotate a central lead screw.

=== Single action ===
Fig. 2: Piezo ratchet stepping motor.

Very simple single-action stepping motors can be made with piezoelectric crystals. For example, with a hard and rigid rotor-spindle coated with a thin layer of a softer material (like a polyurethane rubber), a series of angled piezoelectric transducers can be arranged. (see Fig. 2). When the control circuit triggers one group of transducers, they push the rotor one step. This design cannot make steps as small or precise as more complex designs, but can reach higher speeds and is cheaper to manufacture.

== Patents ==
The first U.S. patent to disclose a vibrationally-driven motor may be "Method and Apparatus for Delivering Vibratory Energy" (U.S. Pat. No. 3,184,842, Maropis, 1965). The Maropis patent describes a "vibratory apparatus wherein longitudinal vibrations in a resonant coupling element are converted to torsional vibrations in a toroid type resonant terminal element." The first practical piezomotors were designed and produced by V. Lavrinenko in Piezoelectronic Laboratory, starting 1964, Kyiv Polytechnic Institute, USSR. Other important patents in the early development of this technology include:

- "Electrical motor", V. Lavrinenko, M. Nekrasov, Patent USSR # 217509, priority May 10, 1965.
- "Piezoelectric motor structures" (U.S. Pat. No. 4,019,073, Vishnevsky, et al., 1977)
- "Piezoelectrically driven torsional vibration motor" (U.S. Pat. No. 4,210,837, Vasiliev, et al., 1980)

== See also ==
- Ultrasonic motor
- Ultrasonic Motor Drive as used in the Canon EF Mount
- Ultrasonic homogenizer
