= .S =

.S may refer to:

- .S (file extension), used for assembler source code files
- Dot-S, a lighted toy
