= Which Witch (disambiguation) =

Which Witch is a 1987 musical written by Benedicte Adrian and Ingrid Bjørnov.

Which Witch may also refer to:

- Which Witch? (board game), a children's game
- Which Witch? (novel), a 1979 children's novel by Eva Ibbotson
- "Which Witch!", a sub-episode of Tom and Jerry Tales
- "Which Witch", a 2015 song by Florence and the Machine from the deluxe edition of their third album How Big, How Blue, How Beautiful

== See also ==
- "Which Witch Is Which?", an episode of The Worst Witch
- Which Wich?, an American sandwich restaurant chain
