= Ghost Castle =

The term Ghost Castle could refer to:

- Ghost Castle, British variant of the board game Which Witch?
- Tales of Ghost Castle, a 1975 horror anthology comic book series published by DC Comics

== See also ==
- Ghost in the Castle, a 1947 German comedy horror film
