= Bimorphic =

Bimorphic can refer to:

- Bimorphism, a type of mapping in mathematics
- Bimorph, a piezoelectric cantilever with two active layers
