= Cantilever =

Beam anchored at only one end

A schematic image of three types of cantilever. The top example has a full moment connection (like a horizontal flagpole bolted to the side of a building). The middle example is created by an extension of a simple supported beam (such as the way a diving board is anchored and extends over the edge of a swimming pool). The bottom example is created by adding a Robin boundary condition to the beam element, which essentially adds an elastic spring to the end board. The top and bottom example may be considered structurally equivalent, depending on the effective stiffness of the spring and beam element.

A cantilever is a structural element that is firmly attached to a fixed structure at one end and is unsupported at the other end. Sometimes it projects from a vertical surface such as a wall. A cantilever can be in the form of a beam, plate, truss, or slab.

When subjected to a structural load at its far, unsupported end, the cantilever carries the load to the support where it applies a shear stress and a bending moment.

Cantilever construction allows overhanging structures without external support.

== In bridges, railroad crossings, towers, and buildings ==
Cantilevers are widely found in construction, notably in cantilever bridges and balconies (see corbel). In cantilever bridges, the cantilevers are usually built as pairs, with each cantilever used to support one end of a central section. The Forth Bridge in Scotland is an example of a cantilever truss bridge. A cantilever in a traditionally timber framed building is called a jetty or forebay. In the southern United States, a historic barn type is the cantilever barn of log construction.

Temporary cantilevers are often used in construction. The partially constructed structure creates a cantilever, but the completed structure does not act as a cantilever. This is very helpful when temporary supports, or falsework, cannot be used to support the structure while it is being built (e.g., over a busy roadway or river, or in a deep valley). Therefore, some truss arch bridges (see Navajo Bridge) are built from each side as cantilevers until the spans reach each other and are then jacked apart to stress them in compression before finally joining. Nearly all cable-stayed bridges are built using cantilevers as this is one of their chief advantages. Many box girder bridges are built segmentally, or in short pieces. This type of construction lends itself well to balanced cantilever construction where the bridge is built in both directions from a single support.

These structures rely heavily on torque and rotational equilibrium for their stability.

Simple sketch of cantilevering steel beams.

In an architectural application, Frank Lloyd Wright's Fallingwater used cantilevers to project large balconies. The East Stand at Elland Road Stadium in Leeds was, when completed, the largest cantilever stand in the world holding 17,000 spectators. The roof built over the stands at Old Trafford uses a cantilever so that no supports will block views of the field. The old (now demolished) Miami Stadium had a similar roof over the spectator area. The largest cantilevered roof in Europe is located at St James' Park in Newcastle-Upon-Tyne, the home stadium of Newcastle United F.C.

Less obvious examples of cantilevers are free-standing (vertical) radio towers without guy-wires, and chimneys, which resist being blown over by the wind through cantilever action at their base.

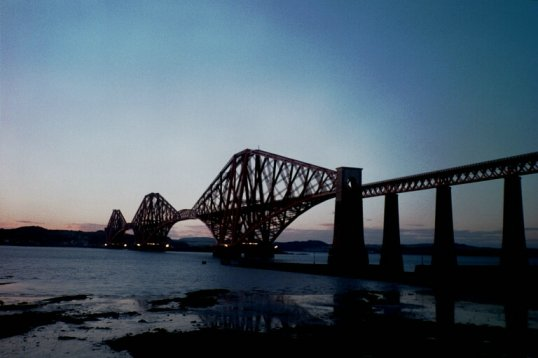
The Forth Bridge, a cantilever truss bridge

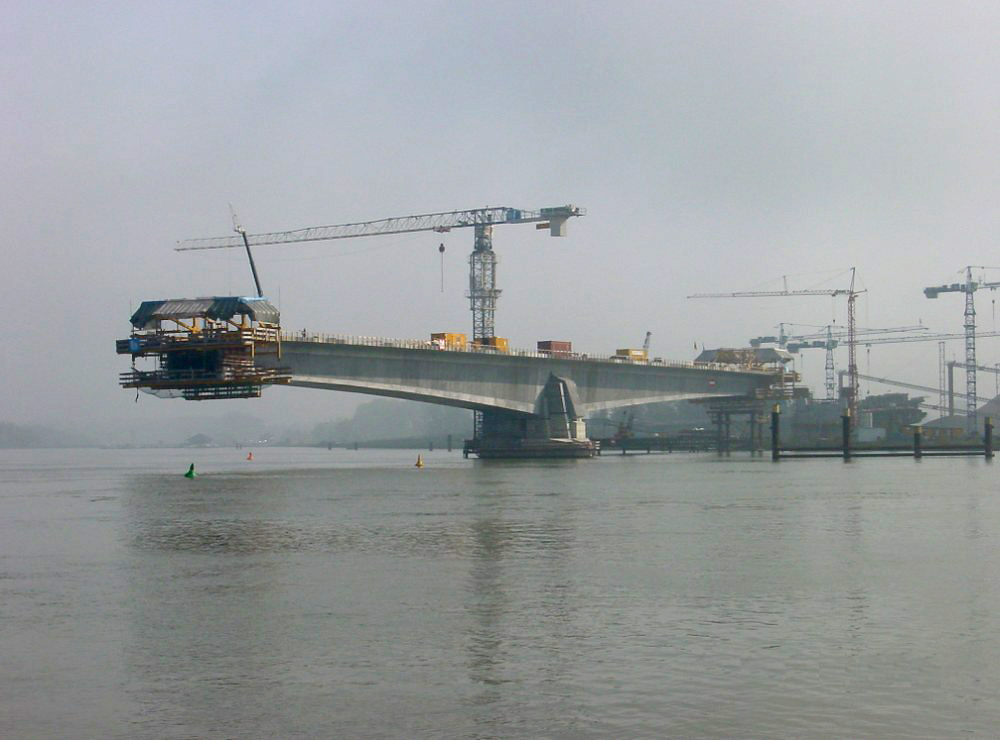
A concrete bridge temporarily functions as a set of two balanced cantilevers during construction – with further cantilevers jutting out to support formwork.

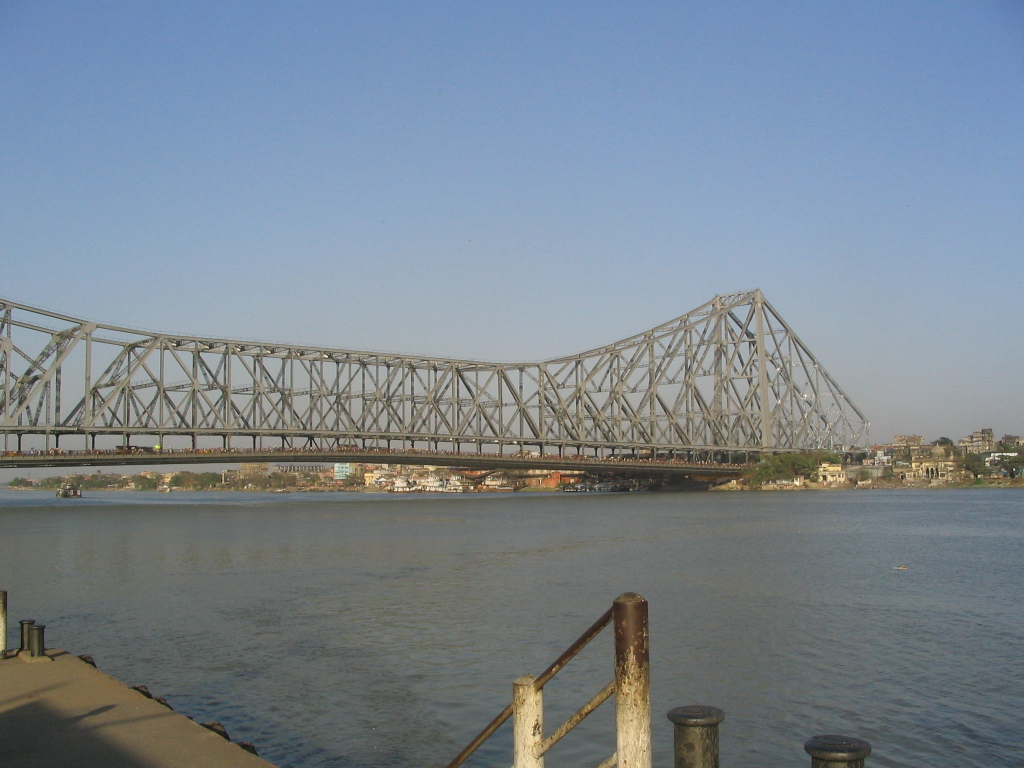
Howrah Bridge in India, a cantilever bridge

A railroad crossing in San Mateo, California that features a overhead cantilever

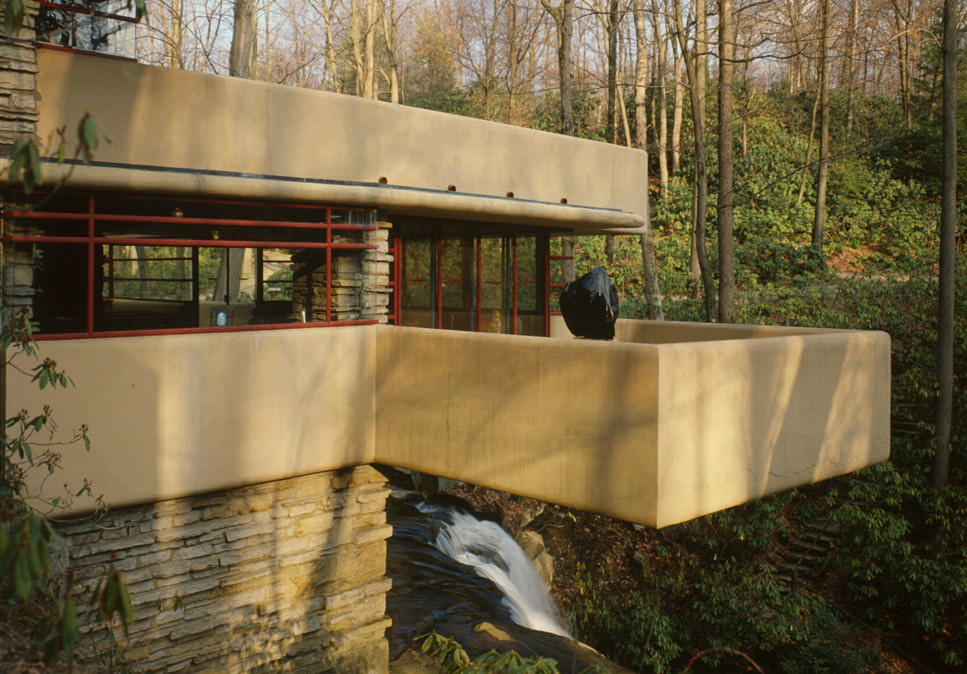
A cantilevered balcony of the Fallingwater house, by Frank Lloyd Wright

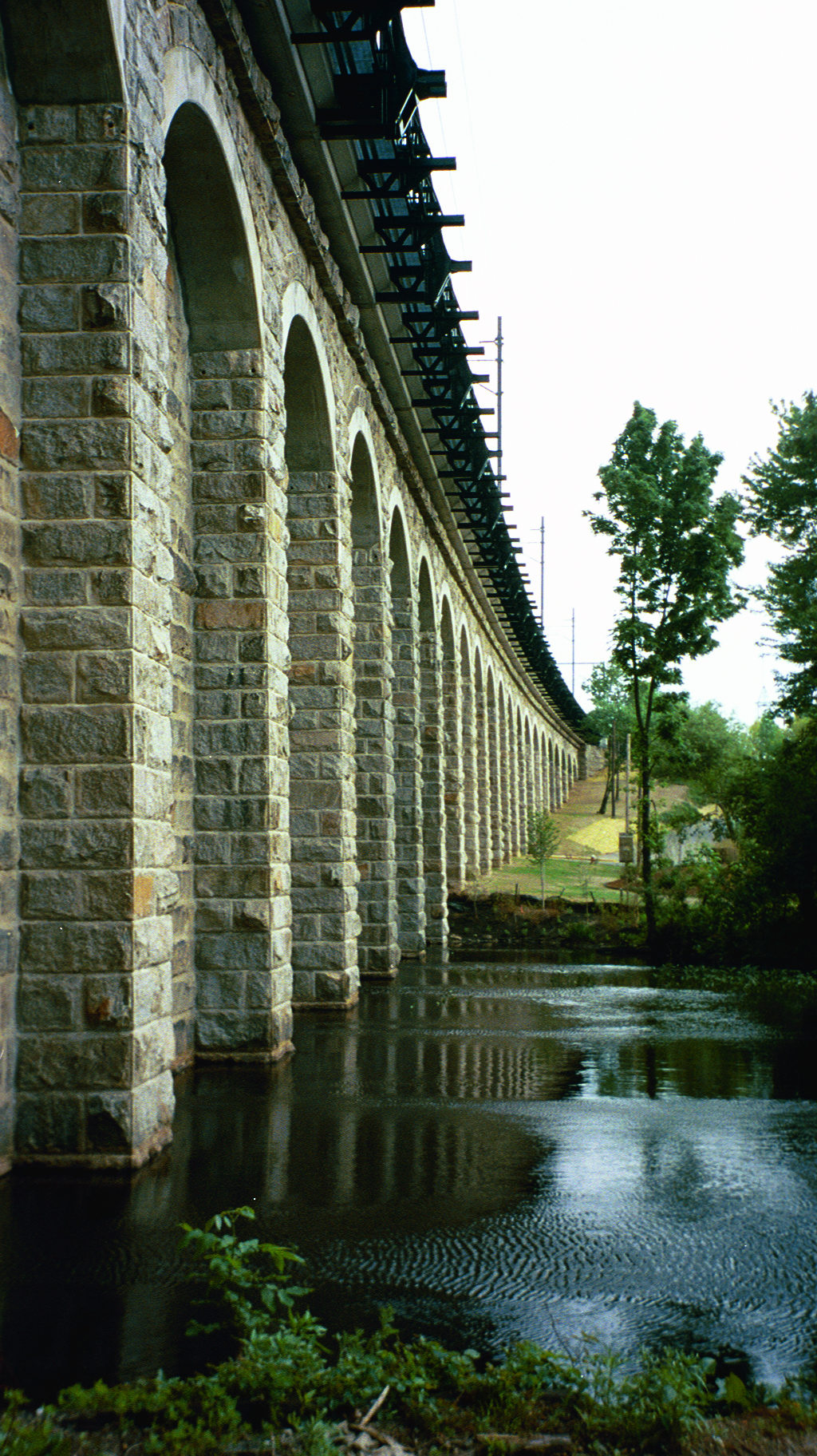
A cantilevered railroad deck and fence on the Canton Viaduct

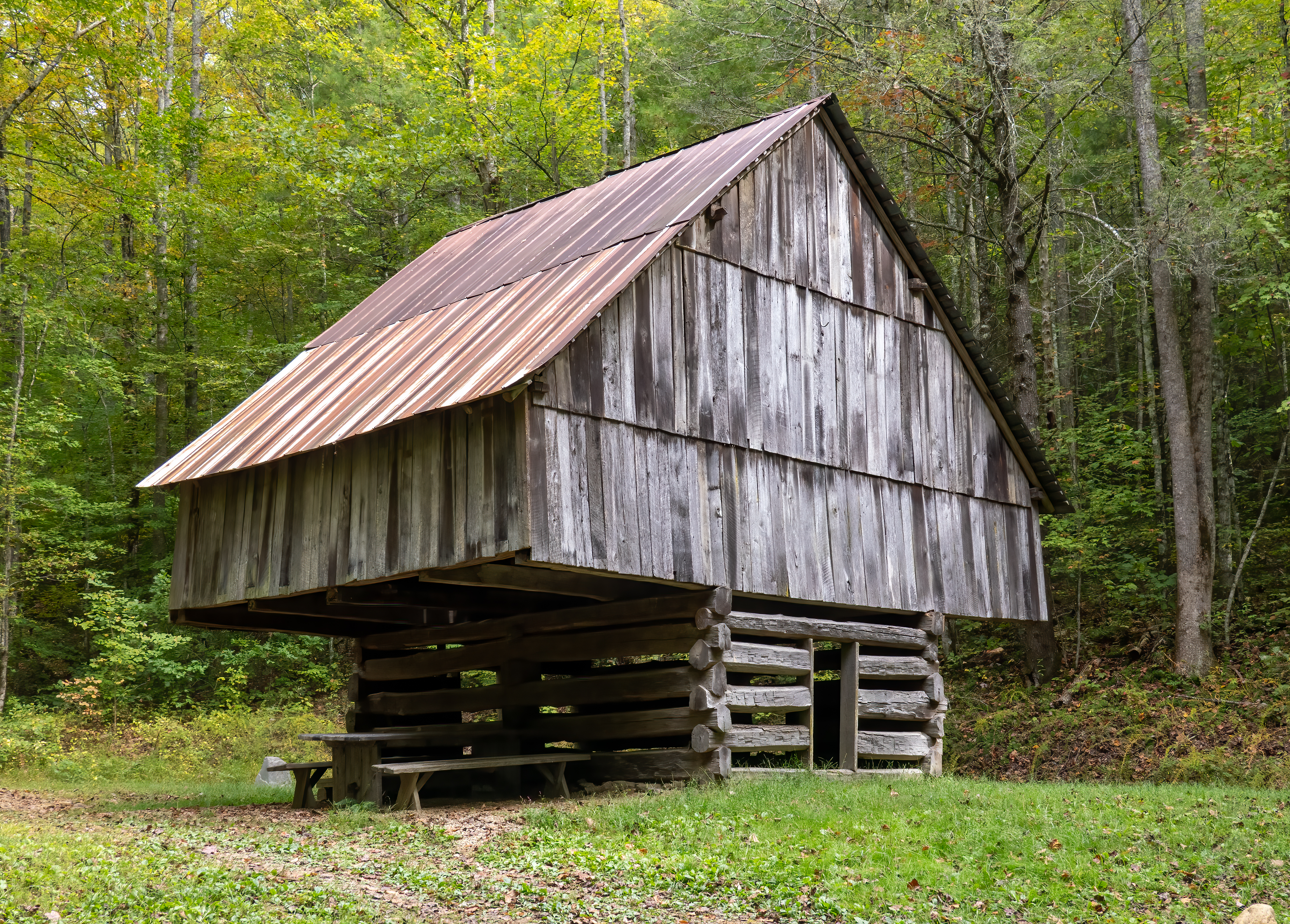
A cantilever barn in rural Tennessee

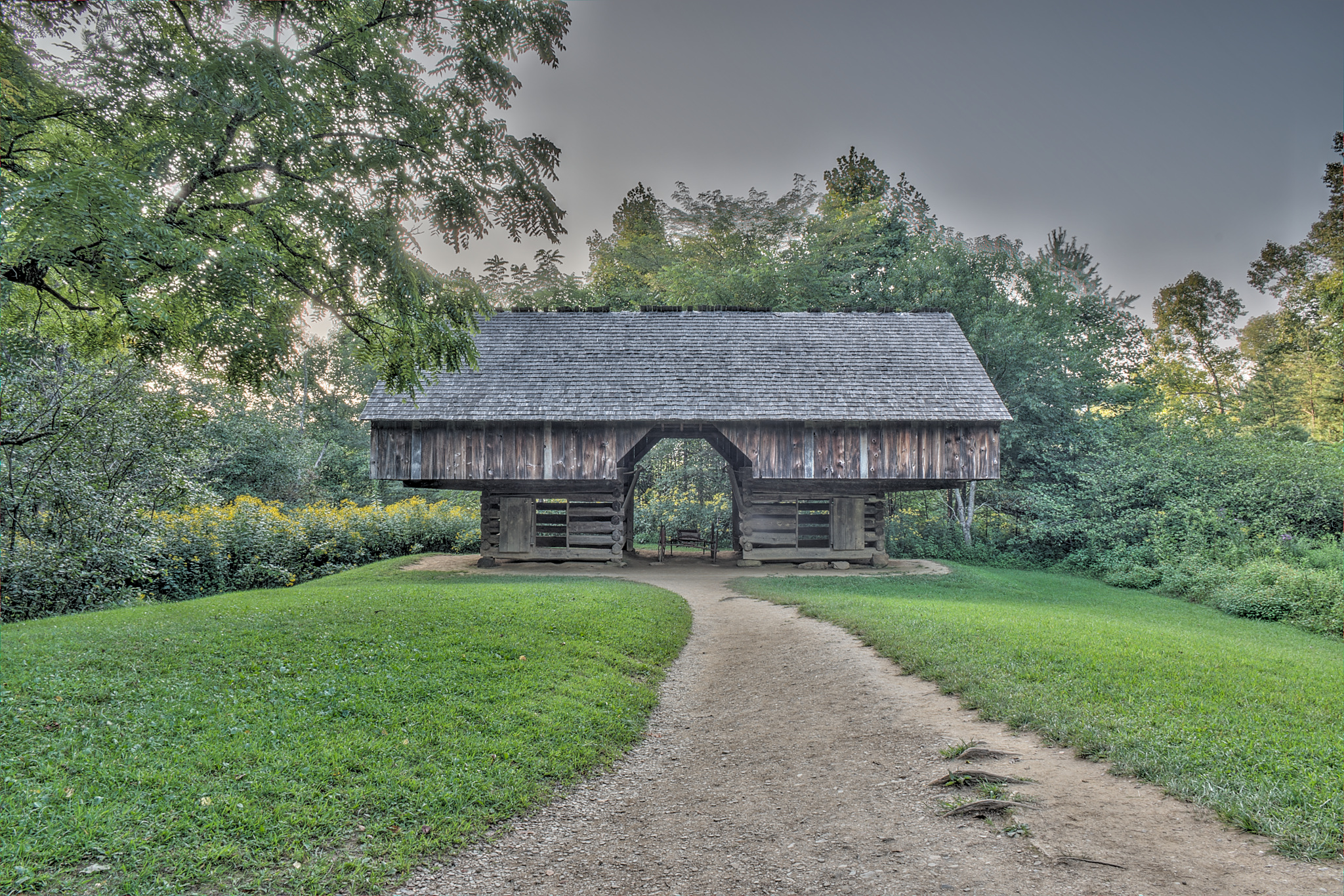
Cantilever barn at Cades Cove

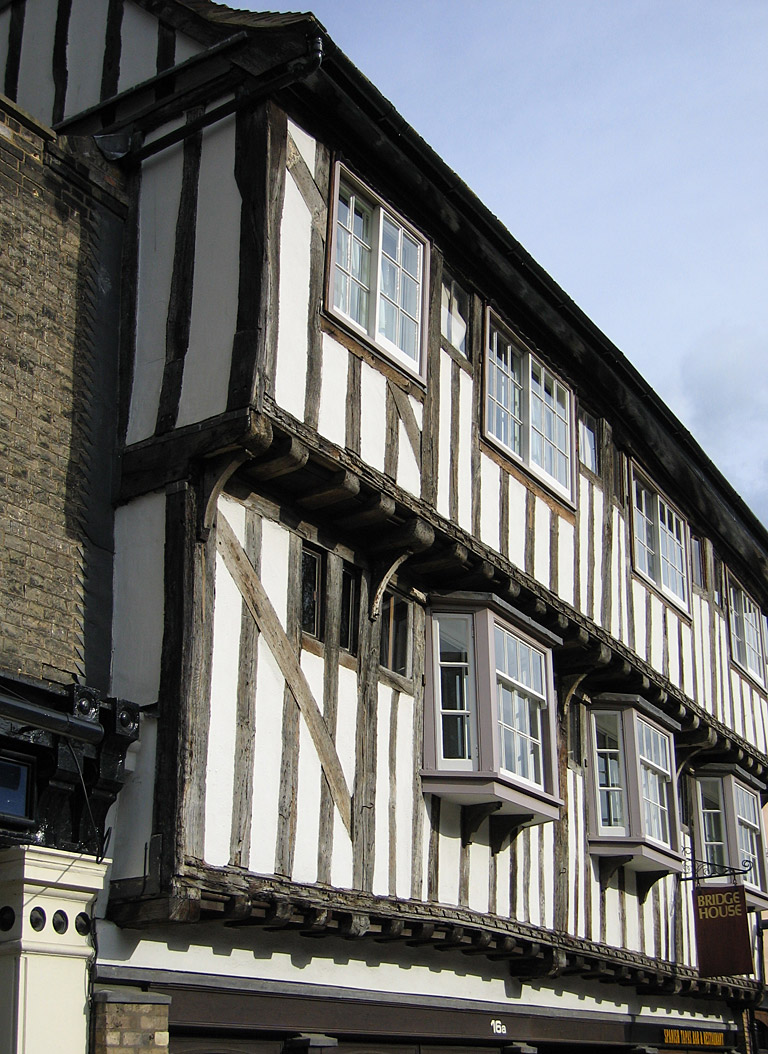
A double jettied building in Cambridge, England

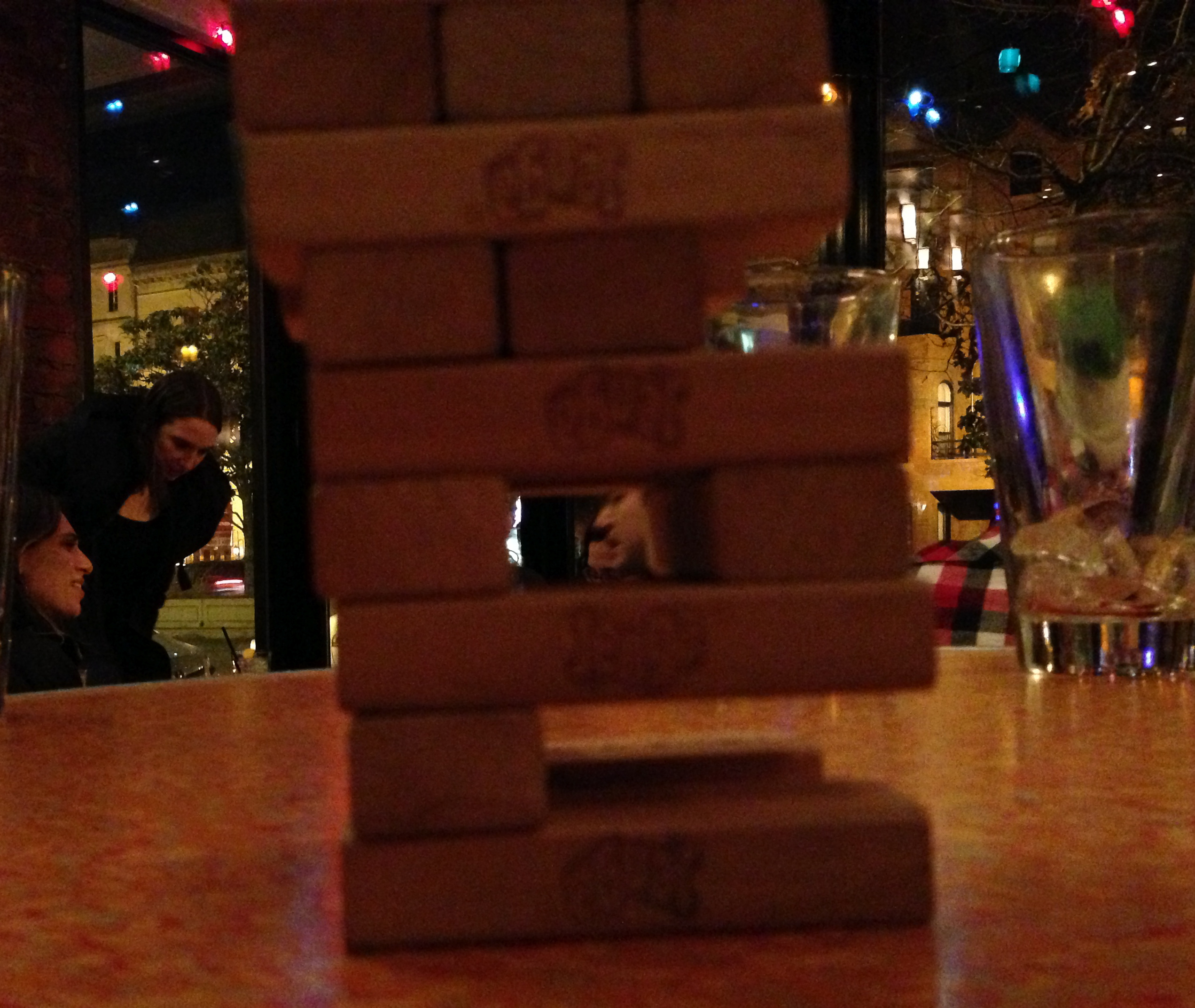
Cantilever occurring in the game Jenga

Busan Cinema Center in Busan, South Korea, with the world's longest cantilever roof

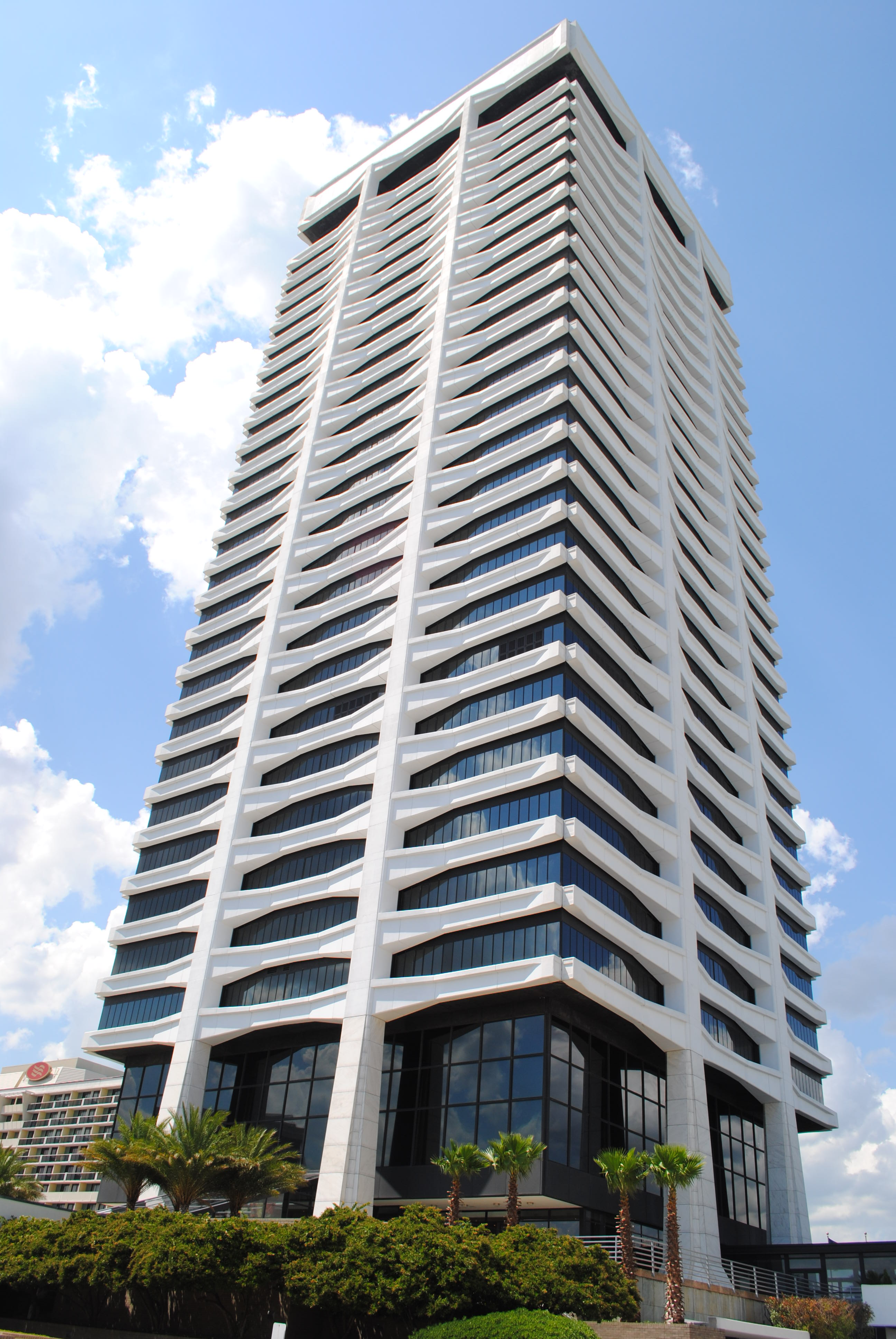
Cantilever facade of Riverplace Tower in Jacksonville, Florida, by Welton Becket and KBJ Architects

This radiograph of a "bridge" dental restoration features a cantilevered crown to the left.

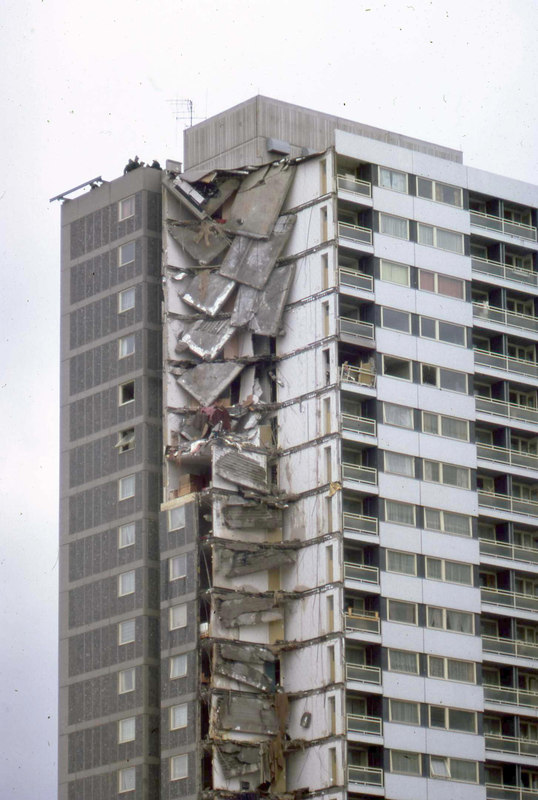
Ronan Point: Structural failure of part of floors cantilevered from a central shaft.

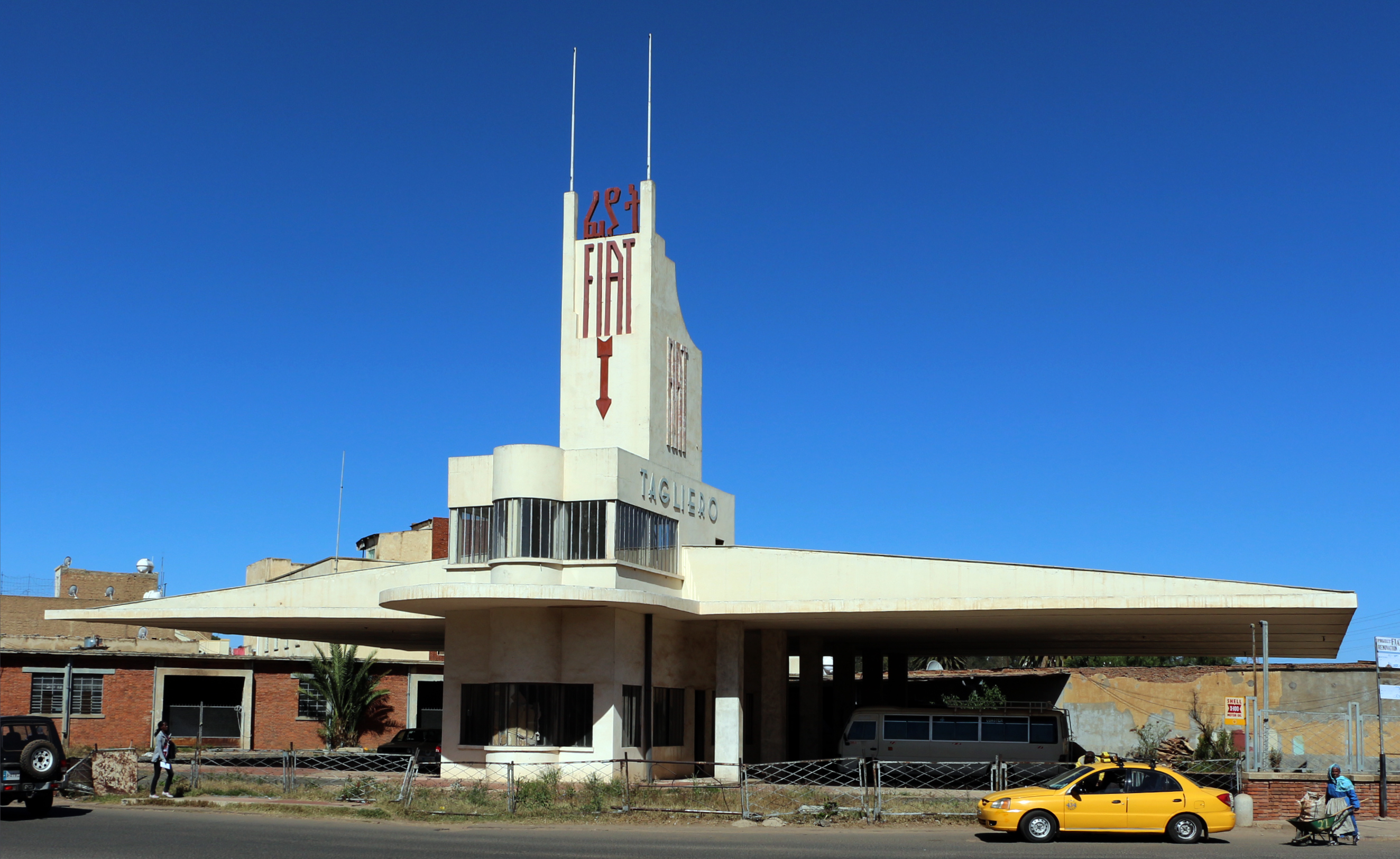
Fiat Tagliero, a Futurist-style service station in Asmara, Eritrea, has a mirrored cantilevered roof.

== In aircraft ==
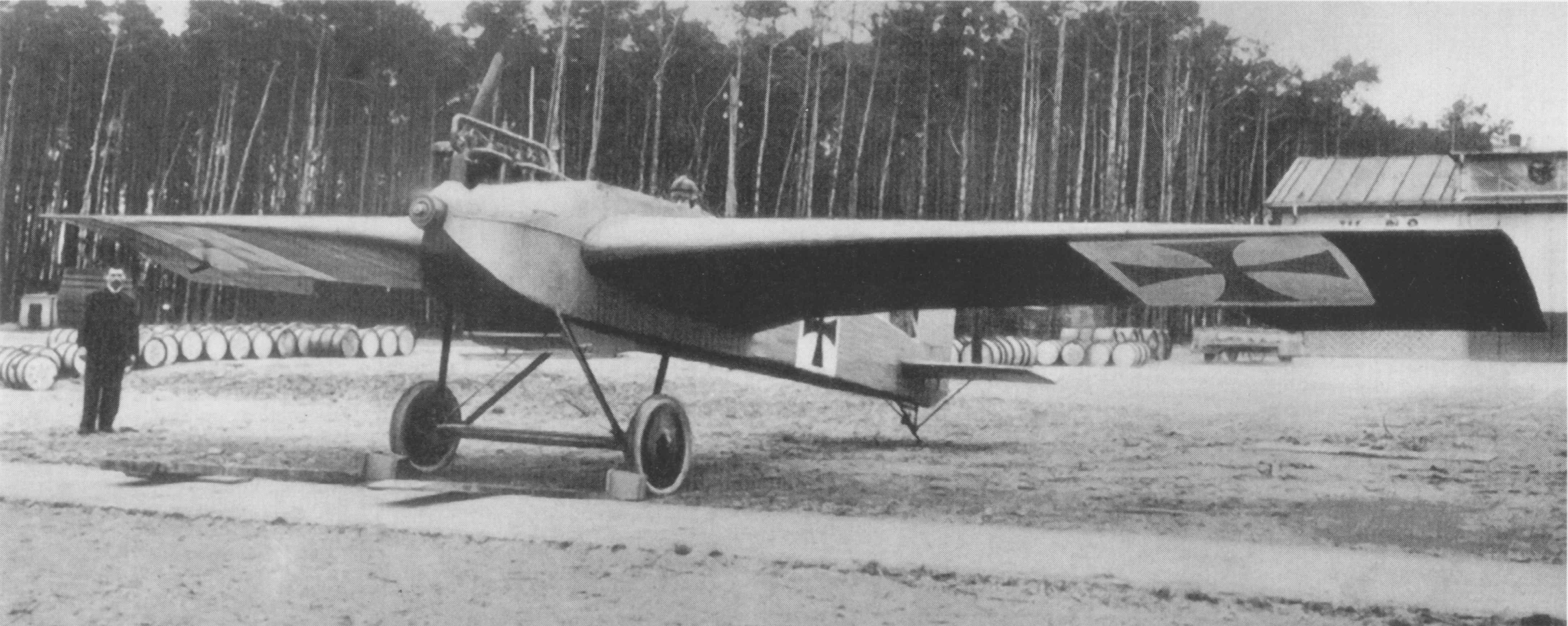
The pioneering Junkers J 1 all-metal monoplane of 1915, the first aircraft to fly with cantilever wings

The cantilever is commonly used in the wings of fixed-wing aircraft. Early aircraft had light structures braced with wires and struts which introduced aerodynamic drag and limited performance. While heavier, the cantilever avoids this issue and allows the plane to fly faster.

Hugo Junkers pioneered the cantilever wing in 1915. Only a dozen years after the Wright Brothers' initial flights, Junkers endeavored to eliminate virtually all major external bracing members to decrease airframe drag. The result was the Junkers J 1 pioneering all-metal monoplane of late 1915, designed with all-metal cantilever wing panels. About a year after the initial success of the Junkers J 1, Reinhold Platz of Fokker also achieved success with a cantilever-winged sesquiplane built instead with wooden materials, the Fokker V.1.

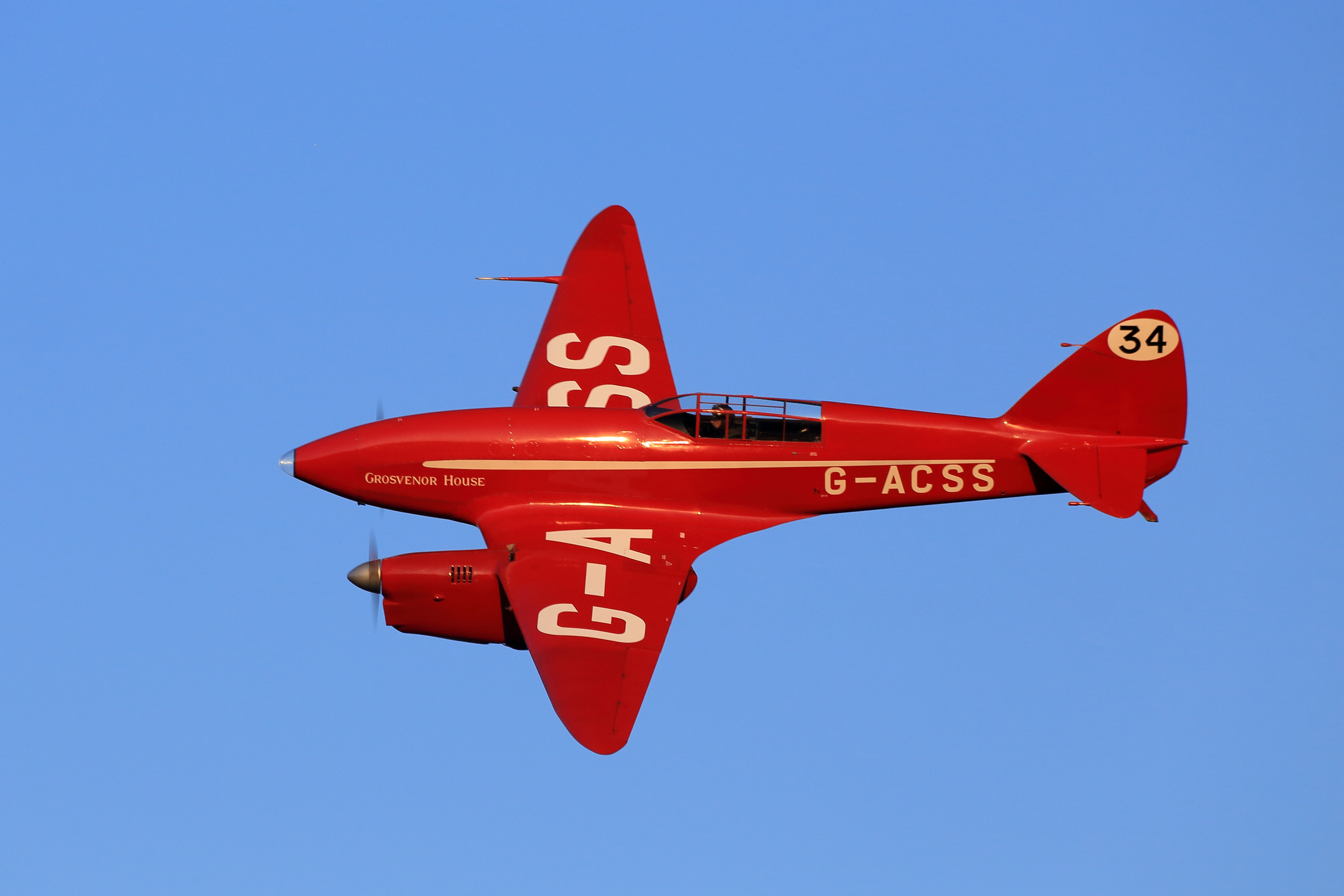
de Havilland DH.88 Comet G-ACSS, winner of the Great Air Race of 1934, showing off its cantilever wing

In the cantilever wing, one or more strong spars run along the span of the wing. The end fixed rigidly to the central fuselage is known as the root and the far end as the tip. The wings generate lift which the spars carry through to the fuselage.

To resist horizontal shear from drag or engine thrust, the wing must also form a stiff cantilever in the horizontal plane. A single-spar design will usually be fitted with a second, smaller, drag-spar nearer the trailing edge, braced to the main spar via internal members or a stressed skin. The wing must also resist twisting forces, achieved by cross-bracing or otherwise stiffening the main structure.

Cantilever wings require much stronger and heavier spars than would be needed in a wire-braced design. However, as aircraft speed increases, the drag of the bracing increases sharply, while the wing structure must be strengthened, typically by increasing the strength of the spars and the thickness of the skinning. At speeds of around 200 miles per hour (320 km/h) the drag of the bracing becomes excessive and the wing strong enough to be made a cantilever without weight penalty. Increases in engine power through the late 1920s and early 1930s raised speeds through this zone and by the late 1930s cantilever wings had almost wholly superseded braced ones. Other changes including enclosed cockpits, retractable undercarriage, landing flaps and stressed-skin construction furthered the design revolution, with the pivotal moment acknowledged to be the MacRobertson England-Australia air race of 1934, won by a de Havilland DH.88 Comet.

Cantilever wings are now almost universal with bracing only being used for some slower aircraft where lighter weight is prioritized over speed, such as in the ultralight class.

== Microcantilever ==
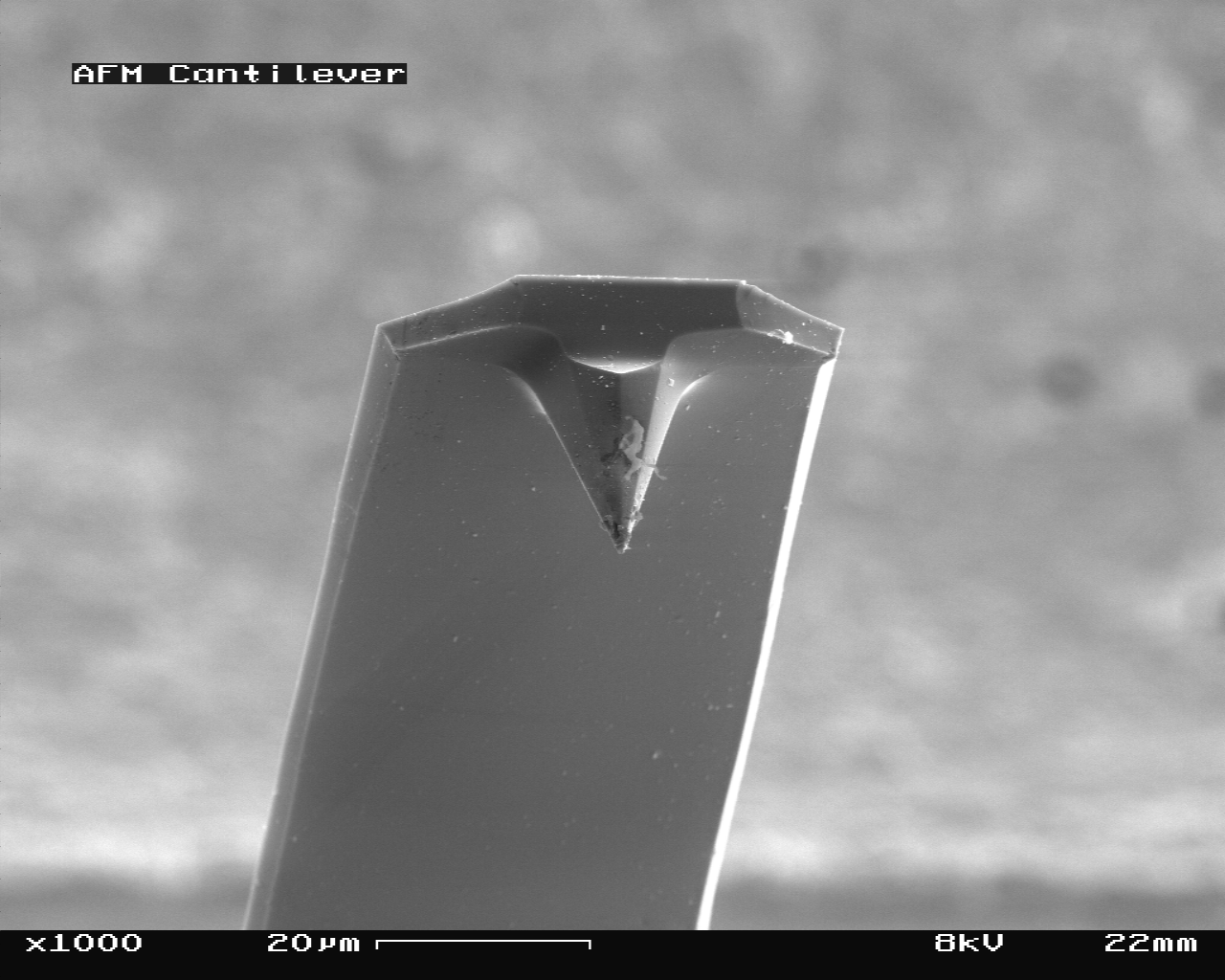
Scanning electron microscope image of an atomic force microscopy microcantilever

Cantilevered beams are the most ubiquitous structures in the field of microelectromechanical systems (MEMS). An early example of a MEMS cantilever is the Resonistor, an electromechanical monolithic resonator. MEMS cantilevers are commonly fabricated from silicon (Si), silicon nitride (Si_{3}N_{4}), or polymers. The fabrication process typically involves undercutting the cantilever structure to release it, often with an anisotropic wet or dry etching technique. Without cantilever transducers, atomic force microscopy would not be possible. A large number of research groups are attempting to develop cantilever arrays as biosensors for medical diagnostic applications. MEMS cantilevers are also finding application as radio frequency filters and resonators. Types of MEMS cantilevers include unimorphs and bimorphs.

Challenges for their practical application lie in the square and cubic dependences of cantilever performance specifications on dimensions. These superlinear dependences mean that cantilevers are quite sensitive to variation in process parameters, particularly the thickness as this is generally difficult to accurately measure. However, it has been shown that microcantilever thicknesses can be precisely measured and that this variation can be quantified. Controlling residual stress can also be difficult.

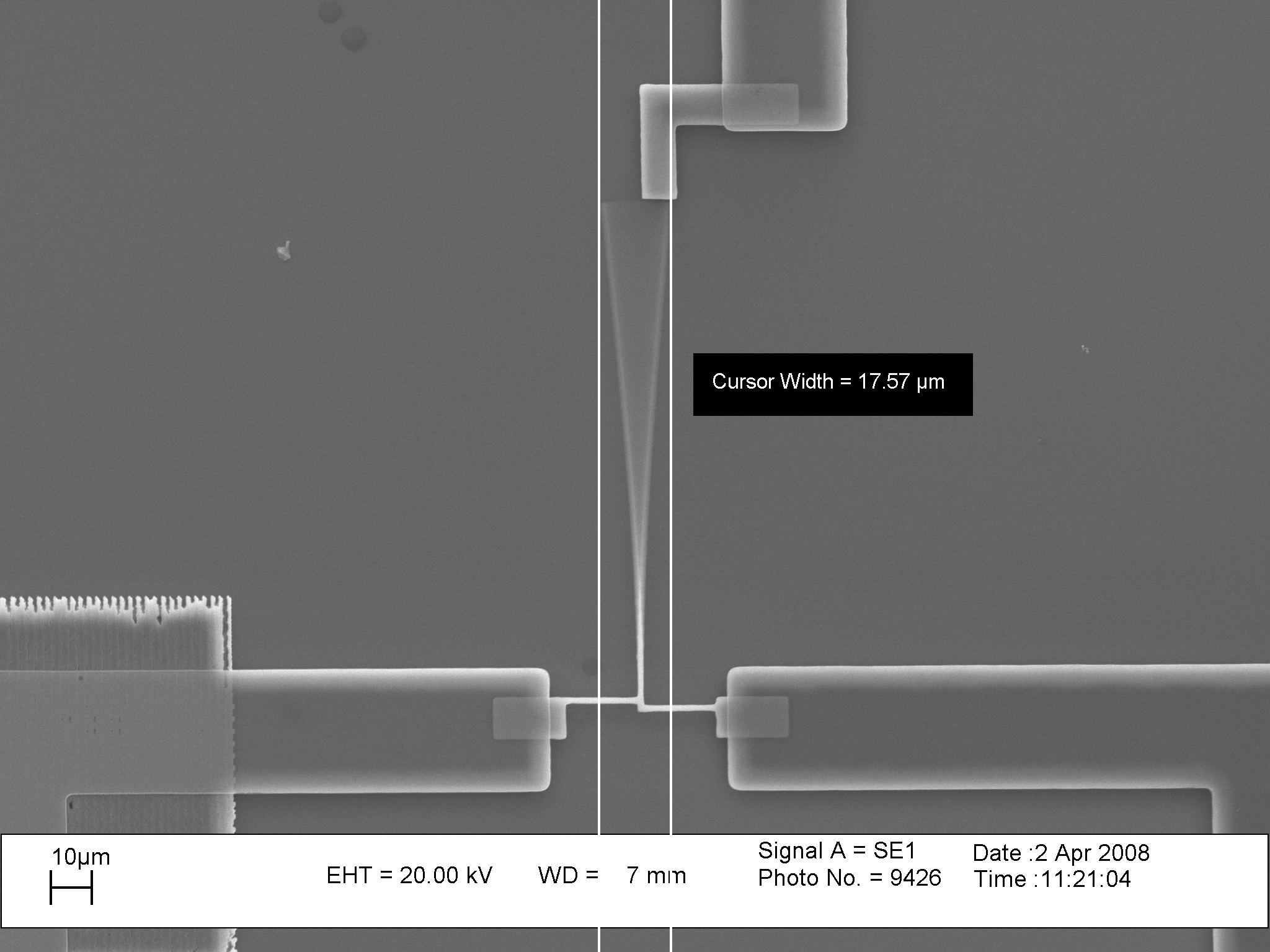
MEMS cantilever in resonance

A microcantilever may be used as chemical sensor by coating it with a material that binds to specific chemicals. For example, an immunosensor based on an antibody layer that interacts selectively with a particular immunogen. In the static mode of operation, the sensor response is represented by the beam bending with respect to a reference microcantilever. Alternatively, microcantilever sensors can be operated in the dynamic mode. In this case, the beam vibrates at its resonance frequency and a variation in this parameter indicates the concentration of the analyte. Porous microcantilevers have been fabricated providing a much larger surface area for analyte to bind to. This improves sensitivity by raising the ratio of the analyte mass to the cantilever mass.

== See also ==
- Applied mechanics
- Cantilever bicycle brakes
- Cantilever bicycle frame
- Cantilever chair
- Cantilever method
- Cantilevered stairs
- Corbel arch
- Euler–Bernoulli beam theory
- Grand Canyon Skywalk
- Knudsen force in the context of microcantilevers
- Orthodontics
- Statics

== Sources ==
- Inglis, Simon: Football Grounds of Britain. CollinsWillow, 1996. page 206.
- Madou, Marc J (2002). Fundamentals of Microfabrication. Taylor & Francis. ISBN 0-8493-0826-7.
- Roth, Leland M (1993). Understanding Architecture: Its Elements History and Meaning. Oxford, UK: Westview Press. pp. 23–4. ISBN 0-06-430158-3.
- Sarid, Dror (1994). Scanning Force Microscopy. Oxford University Press. ISBN 0-19-509204-X.
