= Lite-Brite =

Toy comprising a lightbox and pegs

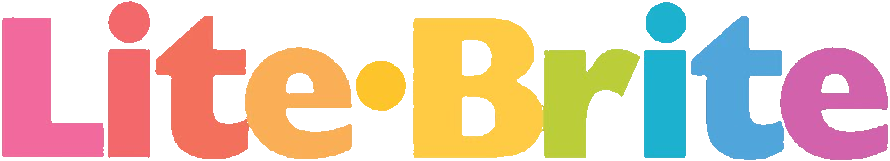
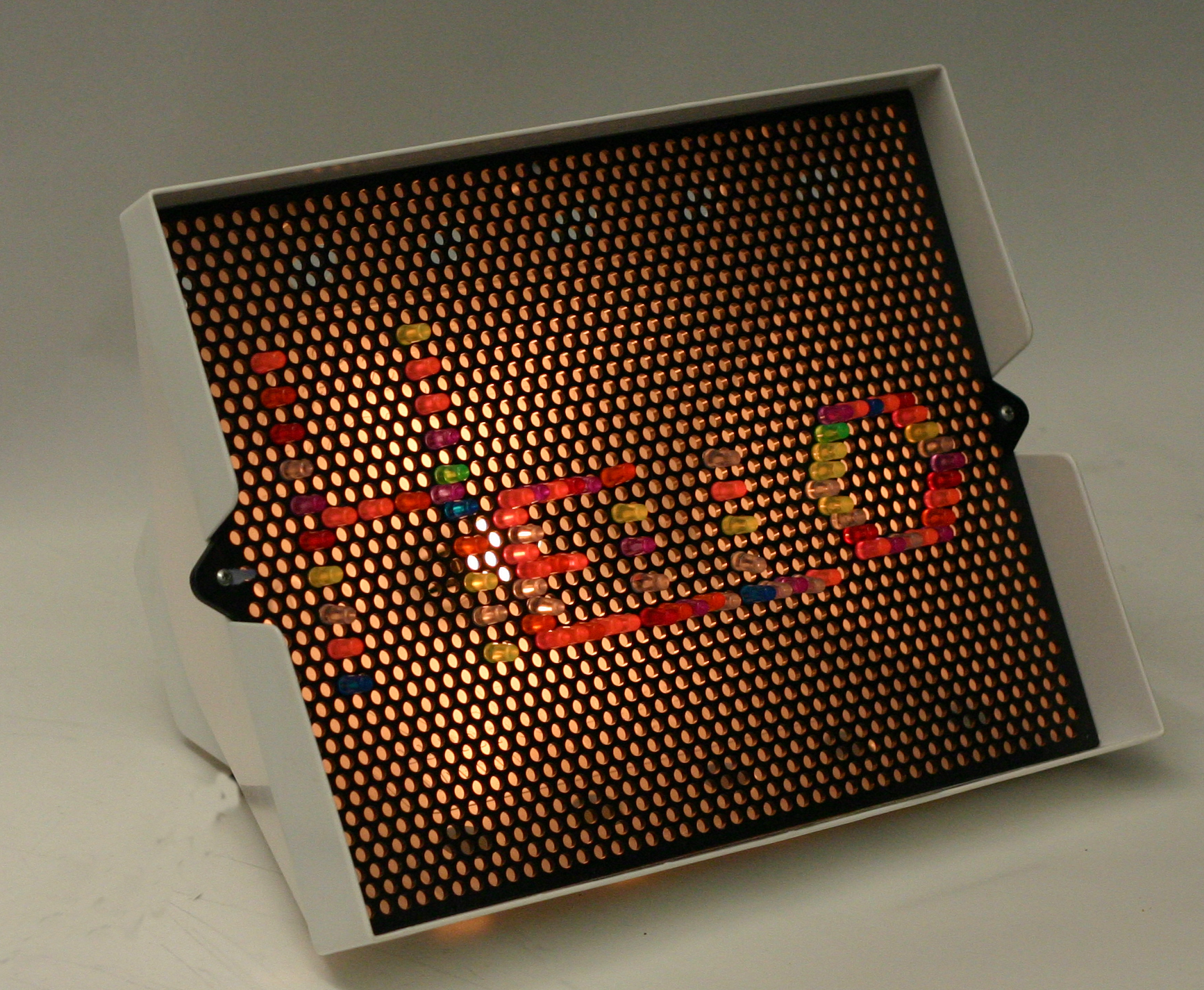
- A Lite-Brite (without black paper) spelling "Hello"
- Type: Arts and Craft
- Invented by: Burt Meyer
- Company: Hasbro; Basic Fun
- Country: United States
- Availability: 1967–present
- Slogan: "Lite-Brite, making things with light, What a sight, making things with Lite-Brite!"
- www.basicfun.com/lite-brite/

Lite-Brite is a toy that consists of a light box with small colored plastic pegs that fit into a panel and illuminate to create a lit picture. The pegs can be inserted by either using one of the included templates or creating a "freeform" image on a blank sheet of black paper. It was originally marketed in 1967.

== History ==
Lite-Brite was invented by Burt Meyer, Dalia Verbickas, and Joseph M. Burck at Chicago toy and game design company Marvin Glass and Associates, which licensed the invention to Hasbro. Meyer led the project, Verbickas posited the idea of using a translucent material to direct colored light, and Burck designed the toy itself. Lite-Brite was named one of the top 100 toys of all time by Time magazine in 2011. It was inducted into the National Toy Hall of Fame in 2022.

== Description ==
Lite-Brite allows the artist to create a glowing picture by punching multicolored translucent plastic pegs through opaque black paper. Using a standard light bulb, the light is blocked by the black paper except where the pegs conduct the light. When lit, the pegs have an appearance similar to that of LEDs.

There are eight peg colors: red, blue, orange, white (clear/colorless), green, yellow, pink, and violet (purple).

Because pushing the pegs in punches out the letters on the paper, each sheet can be used only once. Color-by-letter templates were sold with the set so that children could create characters from licensed works including Mickey Mouse, Scooby-Doo, My Little Pony, and Transformers among others. Blank black sheets were also available for those who wanted to create their own images.

== Changes ==
Over the years, Lite-Brite was offered in different forms including a flat-screen version, Lite Brite touch version, a 3D cube, and an FX edition that spins and plays music. The Lite-Brite LED Flat Screen comes in several colors, is LED lit, and is portable, running on three AA batteries. The Lite-Brite 3D cube (called the Four-Share Cube) was LED-lit on four of the six sides of the cube, allowing a child to play with friends or save three of their designs while working on a fourth. The FX Edition is no longer on Hasbro's website.

== See also ==
- Dot-S
- Making Things with Light
