= Masterpiece (game) =

Board game about selling paintings

- Designers: Marvin Glass
- Publishers: Parker Brothers
- Players: 3 to 6
- Setup time: 5–10 minutes
- Playing time: 1 hour
- Chance: a little
- Age range: 12 to Adult
- Skills: Bluffing; Negotiation

Masterpiece is a board game by Parker Brothers, now a brand of Hasbro. Players participate in auctions for famous works of art. The original design was by Christian Thee, who tried to sell it to Parker Brothers in 1969. They rejected it, but brought out Masterpiece, a similar game, the following year. It was credited to Jeffrey Breslow of Marvin Glass and Associates and originally published in 1970 by Parker Brothers, and then published again in 1976 and 1996. Thee successfully sued Parker Brothers and was awarded $400,000. The game is now out of print.

In this game, players compete with other players to bid on potentially valuable paintings, and negotiate with other players to trade these works of art, build a portfolio, amass money, and win the game. The top value of a painting in the 1970 edition is $1 million, and $10 million in the 1996 edition; however, getting the full value for the painting requires some luck in landing on the right square on the board to sell a painting to the bank.

The game utilizes bluffing skills because the players possess asymmetrical information about the value of the paintings they possess. Some pictures are known to their owners to be 'forgeries' with an actual value of zero. These 'forgeries' can, however, be resold to other players or to the bank with the value hidden.

== Versions ==
=== Original U.S. Release (1970) ===
1. The game box is in English only.
2. A green-backed game board with the centre featuring Old Man with a Gold Chain by Rembrandt (1631, Art Institute of Chicago)
3. Play money with denominations colored in gray($50,000), yellow($100,000), red($500,000), and sky blue($1,000,000).
4. The play money says “Masterpiece” on the top and the value on the bottom.
5. There are 24 Value cards ranging in value from $0 (forgery) to $1,000,000.
6. There are 6 Value Chart cards with both a list of the available values in the Value card deck, as well as the bios of the characters seen on the box front. (These cards are the same size as the Value cards.)
7. There are 24 Painting cards (sized measuring 14 cm x 9 cm (5.5” x 3.5”)) that contain paintings on display at the National Gallery in London, England, such as Vincent van Gogh's Sunflowers, Paul Cézanne’s Aix: Paysage Rocheux, Leonardo da Vinci’s The Virgin and Child with St Anne and St John the Baptist, Pierre-Auguste Renoir's Les Parapluies and Claude-Oscar Monet’s The Beach at Trouville. When Joseph Burck first designed the game, he selected all the paintings from the collection of the Art Institute of Chicago, where he lived. Future editions of the game respected Burck's initial concept.

=== Canadian Release (1970) ===
Differs from Original by:

1. The game box has slightly darker tones and richer colors, with both English and French on the cover.
2. The game board has a dark brown backing with the centre featuring Old Man with a Gold Chain by Rembrandt (1631, Art Institute of Chicago)
3. The play money has denominations colored in yellow($50,000), brown($100,000), olive($500,000, and blue($1,000,000).
4. The play money has English on the bottom and French on the top (for example: One Million and Un Million). The word “Masterpiece” is not written on the play money.
5. The Value Chart cards have no character bios on them.

=== United Kingdom Release (1970) ===
Made in the U.K. by Parker Games Division of Palitoy, Limited. In most aspects this is the same as the original U.S. release (1970) and it is stated on the box that the game contains 'Some Imported Components'.

Differs from Original by:

1. The play money has pound sterling denominations coloured in peach(£50,000), blue(£100,000), salmon(£500,000), and green(£1,000,000).

=== Release (1976) ===
Differs from Original by:

1. The box color now sported a green-tinged motif.
2. The box art shows talking paintings replacing the art auction characters.
3. The Value Chart cards have no character bios on them.
4. A completely different painting card set featuring paintings on display at the Art Institute of Chicago. Paintings include such works as Hans Hofmann’s The Golden Wall, Peter Blume’s The Rock, Edward Hopper’s Nighthawks, Grant Wood’s American Gothic, Vincent van Gogh’s Self Portrait and Pablo Picasso’s Sylvette (Portrait of Mlle. D.)

=== Release (1996) ===
differs from Original by:

1. The box cover brought back the concept of art auction characters (featuring a rather surprised blonde lady surrounded by a variety of other characters) with a red-tinged background.
2. The Value Chart cards have no character bios on them but a box insert discusses each of the art collector characters in detail.
3. The play money has much higher denominations, with denominations of $500,000, $1,000,000, $5,000,000, and $10,000,000.
4. The Value cards reduced in size to 7.5cm x 4.5 cm (3” x 1.8”) and increased in number from 24 to 42 with the top value at $10,000,000.
5. A plastic art display easel was included to aid in the auctioning process.
6. The Painting cards remain the same size as previous editions, but feature different paintings from the Art Institute of Chicago, such as Paul Cézanne’s The Basket of Apples, Edward Hopper’s Nighthawks, James Abbott McNeill Whistler’s Violet and Silver – The Deep Sea, Paul Gauguin’s Old Women of Arles, and Vincent van Gogh’s Bedroom in Arles.

=== Release (1987 ) ===
1987 American and European editions In 1987, an American edition was released with 8 character cards and a small blue card value card deck. New set of 24 art cards. The money pack is of a smaller different design. The centre of the game board features a self-portrait by Vincent Van Gogh (1887, Art Institute of Chicago)

In 1987, a European edition was released. The centre of the game board features The Laughing Cavalier by Frans Hals (1624, Wallace Collection). Modern new design of money pack. New and different art card set featuring paintings from the National Gallery (London) and the Art Institute of Chicago. The value cards are badge size of 2 1/2 inches by 3 1/2 inches.

== Reception ==
In The Playboy Winner's Guide to Board Games, game designer Jon Freeman reviewed both Masterpiece and Avalon Hill's similar auction-style game The Collector, and didn't like either one. Of Masterpiece, Freeman wrote, "Masterpiece has, if anything, less to offer an adult [than The Collector]." Freeman especially didn't like the high degree of luck required by the game that completely overshadowed any skill or strategy. Freeman concluded "If gratuitous awards for rolling the right number on a die or landing on the proper space is your idea of excitement, then The Collector or Masterpiece may afford you hours of fun. Otherwise, look elsewhere."

Antony Brown, co-founder of Dice Maestro, called Masterpiece "A beautifully presented and fun game that itself is something of an old masterpiece." He noted, "Although luck plays a part in the game, players can win through shrewd buying and selling.... A forgery may be sold back to the bank for a profit or another player may buy it during a private auction. As the game is about wheeling and dealing it is enjoyable for most people and not just art lovers.... It can even generate philosophical discussion. For example, why should a fake be worth so much less than the original?"

In the January 1989 edition of Games International (Issue 2), Derek Carver criticized the lack of skill needed, since luck seemed to be the overwhelming deciding factor. He also pointed out that buying and selling via auction was often a money-losing proposition, and commented that "you could quite easily play the game without buying any pictures at all and just going around collecting your $2 to $10 million handouts plus the odd free picture." He concluded by giving the game a very poor rating of only 1.5 out of 5.

The 1970 and 1996 editions of Masterpiece held ratings of 4.5 out of 5 stars on Amazon.com as of late 2020.

== Other reviews and commentary ==
- Games and Puzzles
- Jeux & Stratégie #52 (as "La Vente aux Enchères"
