= Denys Fisher =

English engineer

- Born: 11 May 1918; Leeds, England
- Died: 17 September 2002 (aged 84); Barrow-in-Furness, England
- Occupation: Engineer
- Known for: Inventor of Spirograph
- Spouses: Elizabeth Stephenson (m. 1940) Kate Waide (m. 1969)

Denys Fisher (11 May 1918 – 17 September 2002) was an English engineer who invented the spirograph and Stickle Bricks toys and created the company Denys Fisher Toys.

== Personal life and education ==
Fisher's early years were spent living in a railway carriage in a field. During an illness he read Lamb’s Infinitesimal Calculus which sparked a lifelong fascination with logic and maths. He attended Roundhay School and then Leeds University, but dropped out of college to join the family firm, Kingfisher (Lubrication) Ltd. Fisher married Elizabeth Stephenson in 1940. They had a daughter and two sons. He subsequently married Kate Wade in 1969. They had two sons. He lived in Dumfries before moving to Clappersgate, Cumbria, in the 1980s.

== Denys Fisher Engineering ==
In 1960 he left the firm to set up his own company, Denys Fisher Engineering, in Leeds. In 1961 the company won a contract with NATO to supply springs and precision components for its 20 mm cannon. NATO awarded the company a £50,000 contract for five million units.

== Spirograph ==
With the money from the NATO contract, Fisher was able to dedicate time to what was to become the Spirograph. Between 1962 and 1964 he developed various drawing machines from Meccano pieces, eventually producing a prototype Spirograph. Patented in 16 countries, it went on sale in Schofields department store in Leeds in 1965. A year later, Fisher licensed Spirograph to Kenner Products in the United States. In 1967 Spirograph was chosen as the UK Toy of the Year.

== Stickle Bricks ==
In 1969, Fisher invented and marketed Stickle Bricks.

== Other projects ==
Denys Fisher Toys, which also produced other toys and board games, was sold to Palitoy in 1970 and it was subsequently bought by Hasbro. Through the 1980s and 1990s Fisher continued to work with Hasbro in developing new toys and refining Spirograph.

== Toys and games ==
Denys Fisher Toys produced the following toys and games:

Board Games

- Are You Being Served
- Dig (1971)
- Big Bully (1972)
- On the Buses (1973)
- The Fastest Gun
- Thomas Cook – Snap Happy
- Dad's Army (1974)
- Ghost Train (1974)
- Bounce Back (1974)
- It's a Knockout (1974)
- Generation Game (1975)
- Guinness Game of World Records (1975)
- The Magic Magic Magic Game (1975)
- Harvey Smith's Showjumping Game (1975)
- Haunted House
- Hotel
- Conquest (1975)
- Miss UK Game (1975)
- Miss World Game
- The Bionic Woman (1975)
- Jimmy Savile's Pop Twenty (1975)
- Up Periscope (1975)
- Doctor Who – with Tom Baker (1975)
- Six Million Dollar Man (1975)
- Six Million Dollar Man – Bionic Crisis (1976)
- James Hunt's Grand Prix Racing Game (1976)
- Perfection (1976)
- The New Avengers (1977)
- Trac 4 (1977)
- Rod Hull's Emu Game
- Scream Inn
- Morecambe & Wise
- War of the Daleks
- Multi-Coloured Swap Shop (1979)

Toys

- Cyborg, Muton and Android (reproductions of Takara's Shonen Cyborg toys)
- Incredible Stretch Hulk (1979, licensed from Mego Corporation)
- Sound A Round Talking Story Game (1969)
- Six Million Dollar Man
- Six Million Dollar Man – Bionic Bust-out Kit
- Six Million Dollar Man – Oscar Goldman
- Six Million Dollar Man – Maskatron
- Spirograph (1965)
- Super Spirograph (1971)
- Spiroscope (1972)
- Spirofoil
- Stickle bricks
- Doctor Who – Tom Baker Doll (1976 [all Doctor Who dolls were made by the Mego Corporation under license])
- Doctor Who – Tardis (1976)
- Doctor Who – Leela (1976)
- Doctor Who – Giant Robot
- Roger De Courcey's Nookie Bear – Ventriloquist Bear (1976)
- Skull Machine
- Outrider
- Stretch Armstrong (licensed from Kenner)
- stretch octopus ( Ollie & Olivia )
- Star Wars – Large R2-D2 (1978)
- Star Wars – Darth Vader (1978)
- Star Wars – Stormtrooper (1978)

General Games

- Blockhead!
- George and Mildred
- Smash Up Derby : T-Bone Crash
- Chip Away (1972) a complete sculpting and painting set for Boys and Girls from 5-13
  (three sets:Tom and Jerry/The Flintstones/Animals)
- Screen-A-Show (1973)

== See also ==
- Etch-a-Sketch
