= Mystery Date (game) =

1965 Milton Bradley Board Game

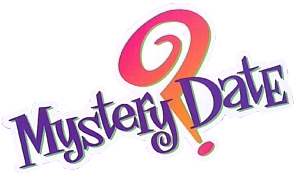

- Mystery Date box cover, 1965
- Manufacturers: Milton Bradley (1965–70); Hasbro (1999–2005)
- Years active: 1965, 1972, 1999, 2005
- Genres: Board game Dice game Card game
- Players: 2–4
- Playing time: 20 minutes
- Chance: Dice
- Skills: Probability

Mystery Date is a board game from the Milton Bradley Company released in 1965, conceived by Marvin Glass and created by Henry Stan. Marketed to girls 6 to 14 years of age, it has been reissued in 1970, 1999, and 2005. It is popularly referenced as a trope in TV and film.

== Gameplay ==
Mystery Date can be played with two, three, or four players. The object of the game is to acquire a desirable date, while avoiding the "dud". Players acquire cards to assemble outfits in four different colors by rolling a die to move around the board, then drawing, discarding, or trading cards as dictated by the spaces where they land. After assembling a three-piece outfit in a single color, the player can open a large plastic "mystery door" set into the center of the board to reveal one of five different dates. These are the "formal dance" date, the "bowling" date (replaced by a "picnic" date in the 1970s version), the "beach" date, the "skiing" date, and the "dud", and are chosen at random by spinning the doorknob before opening the door. The date to be avoided is the poorly dressed "dud". He is wearing slovenly attire, his hair is tousled, and his face sports a beard shadow.

If the player's outfit does not match the revealed date, or if the "dud" comes up, the door is closed and play continues. In the latter case, the player must discard the three cards for the chosen outfit and draw three new ones. The first player to reveal a date in a matching outfit wins the game.

The 1999 version of the game includes an "electronic talking phone" to converse with the dates. Future Captain America actor Chris Evans is on the box using the phone as "Tyler", the "beach" date.

The 2005 version replaces "the dud" with "the nerd" and does not include a phone.

== Reception ==
The book Timeless Toys described Mystery Date as if it were the result of crossing "Barbie in all her high-fashion glory with 1965's biggest game show, Let's Make a Deal". Calling it an example of "simple, yet ingenious" quality typically associated with Marvin Glass, it is now considered "one of the most sought-after games from the '60s".

Having played it as a child, Michelle Slatalla of The New York Times in the 2000s retrospectively called the game's premise "politically incorrect".

In 2013, “Weird Al” Yankovic made a parody of the 1965 commercial on YouTube, featuring him as “the dream” and Adolf Hitler as “the dud”.
