= Stickle Bricks =

Construction toy

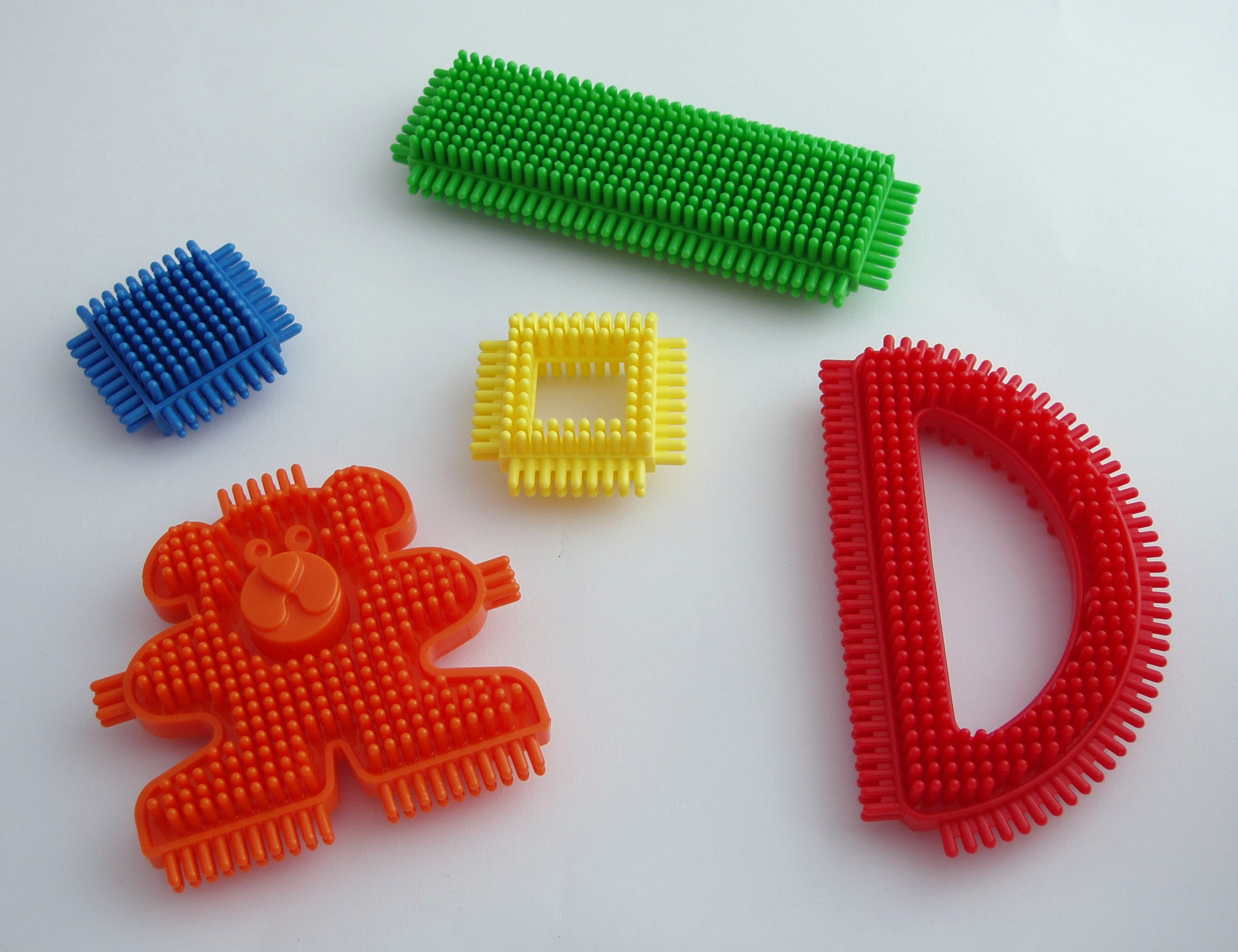
- A selection of bricks
- Type: Construction set
- Invented by: Denys Fisher
- Company: Hasbro
- Country: United States
- Availability: 1969–present
- Materials: Plastic

Stickle Bricks are a construction set primarily intended for toddlers invented by Denys Fisher in 1969. The brand is owned by Hasbro, and as of 2016 is sub-licensed to Flair Leisure Products plc.

== Description ==
An individual Stickle Brick is a colourful plastic shape, a few centimeters long, which has a brush of small plastic fingers on one or more surfaces. The fingers of adjacent Stickle Bricks can interlock, allowing them to be joined in various ways. Standard sets of Stickle Bricks contain triangular, square and rectangular pieces. Many recent sets also include other types of pieces such as heads, wheels and teddy bear shapes.

== History ==
Stickle Bricks were invented in 1969 by Denys Fisher.

From 2001 to 2008, GP Flair was the British distributor of the bricks. In October 2015, Flair licensed the bricks along with Mr. Frosty from Hasbro starting in 2016.

== Similar toys ==
Several companies manufacture similar toys, not all of them compatible. Names for these toys include Nopper, Bristle Blocks, Fun Bricks, Clipo, Krinkles, Multi-Fit, and Thistle Blocks.

== See also ==
- Free Universal Construction Kit – 3D-printable open source construction toy
