= Rock 'Em Sock 'Em Robots =

Two-player action toy and game

- Type: Two-player game
- Invented by: Marvin Glass and Associates
- Company: Louis Marx & Co.
- Country: United States
- Availability: 1964–present
- Materials: Plastic

Rock 'Em Sock 'Em Robots is a two-player action toy and game designed by Marvin Glass and Associates, and first manufactured by the Louis Marx and Company toy company in 1964.

The game features two dueling boxing robots, Red Rocker and Blue Bomber, which are mechanically manipulated by the game's players. The game is won when one player knocks the opposing robot's head up and off the shoulders. The Marx Company was liquidated in 1980, although the game is still available; the 2000s version of the game by Mattel, however, features physically smaller robots.

A film based on the game Rock 'Em Sock 'Em Robots was announced to be in development by Universal Pictures, with Vin Diesel involved, in 2021.

== Play ==
Each player takes control of one of the two robots: Red Rocker and Blue Bomber, both of which are standing on a platform molded in bright yellow high-impact polystyrene plastic, representing a boxing ring. By pushing plunger buttons on a pair of joysticks at the base of the platform, players make their robot punch at their opponent's robot. If a robot's head is hit with sufficient force at a suitable angle, the head will overextend away from the shoulders, signifying that the other player has won the round. The losing player then pushes the head back down to the shoulders to get ready for the next round.

== History ==
From 1948, the International Mutoscope Corporation produced a coin-operated arcade machine called Silver Gloves featuring two players controlling the movement and arms of two boxing figures. The boxing games appeared in arcades, using mannequins made of metal that would fall over if a player managed to hit the button on the chin of the opposing player's dummy.

Rock 'Em Sock 'Em Robots has enjoyed far-ranging success in the United States, selling in the hundreds of thousands and becoming something of a minor popular culture phenomenon. The game was developed for the Marx toy company by the renowned toy design firm Marvin Glass and Associates. After some development, Glass decided to cancel the project in 1963 following the death of boxer Davey Moore in the ring. Burt Meyer felt that the toy was too good to go to waste, and suggested that they "de-humanize" the characters, making them robots which fall apart, rather than humanoid figures who fall over.

Text on the box suggested an outer-space backstory for the two robots. The red boxer is "the rollicking Red Rocker" from Soltarus II, and weighs in at 375 pounds. The blue opponent, the "beautiful Blue Bomber, pride of Umgluck", weighs in at 382 pounds.

The toy first became available to retailers during the 1964 season. Marx produced the action set, virtually unchanged, for well over a decade, until the packaging and characters were updated for the 1977 sales season with a more overt outer-space theme to make it appeal more to buyers looking for space toys following the release of the movie blockbuster Star Wars.

== Versions ==
The game was available in the United Kingdom during the 1970s, where it was sold under the name Raving Bonkers. The two robots were renamed, with the "Blue Bomber" becoming "Basher Bonker" and the "Red Rocker" becoming "Biffer Bonker".

Marx Toys also released an updated version of Rock 'Em Sock 'Em Robots called Clash of the Cosmic Robots in 1977. It featured robots of a design more suitable for the Space Age. The redesign was inspired by the success of the film Star Wars, released that May. Instead of a red robot and a blue robot, Clash of the Cosmic Robots featured PROG-2, an orange robot with a head more like that of RoboCop, and V-STYX, a white robot with a long, protruding mouth (but no eyes). The boxing ring was molded in black to give the game a look reminiscent of outer space. Stickers and decals (for both the robots and the ring) were provided, following the same concept.

For a period of time in the mid-1990s the blue robot was changed to a darker shade of blue and given the old PROG-2 head. The red robot was changed to a grey color (though the instructions referred to him as "silver"), but retained his classic head. Their respective names were changed to "Bolt Crusher Bob" and "Gear Grinder Greg". As in Clash of the Cosmic Robots, stickers and decals were provided for additional design. Aside from the cosmetic changes, the game remained the same.

There have been many variations of the toy, such as the Transformers version, in which the two robots are Optimus Prime and Megatron.

In 2000, a remake of the classic version was developed by Mattel—at approximately half the size of the original model. In addition, an action figure line, a PlayStation game, electronic handhelds, a head-to-head plug and play and bobble head dolls have been recently introduced. The PlayStation game was Rock 'Em Sock 'Em Robots Arena, published by Mattel Interactive, and was developed by Paradox Development using their successful game engine from the completed, but cancelled, Thrill Kill video game. The video game and action figure lines represented a newer, updated version of the robots, whereas the reissued game and licensed products were all based on the original Red Rocker and Blue Bomber characters.

== In popular culture ==
On April 19, 2021, Mattel Films teamed up with Universal Pictures and Vin Diesel's One Race Films for a live-action film adaptation of the 1964-launched toy, with the film starring Diesel himself. In December 2025, it was announced that Diesel would write the script.
