= Inchworm (toy) =

Ride-on toy manufactured by Hasbro

The Inchworm was a ride-on toy for children produced by the Hasbro Corporation, first introduced in the early 1970s. Inchworm was designed by Joseph M. Burck while he worked for Marvin Glass and Associates. Burck built the first inchworm using his clothes-dryer's hose and tested it with his then-three-year-old son. A scooter with yellow wheels in the shape of a green caterpillar wearing a yellow hat, the Inchworm was jointed under the saddle so its wheelbase could expand and contract. The wheels were constricted by a ratchet mechanism to rotating forward. As the rider bounced up and down on the saddle, the toy moved forward in a way somewhat resembling a Geometer caterpillar, with the ratcheting wheels making a clicking sound.
