= Dot-S =

2005 toy

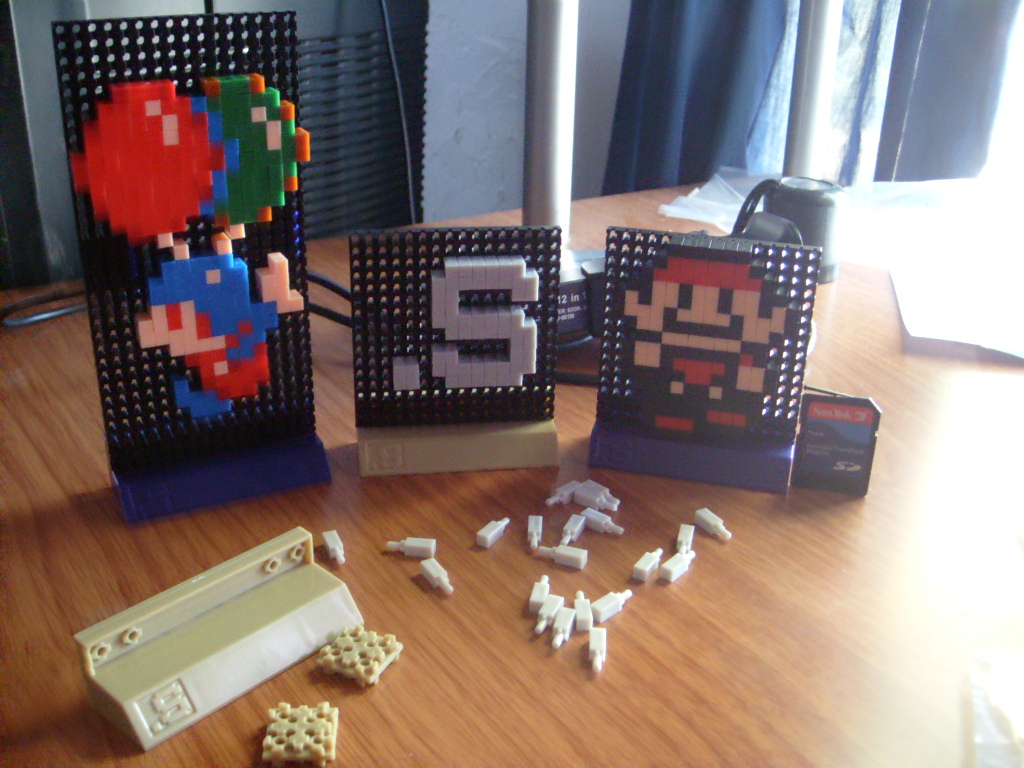
An assortment of dot-S pieces (SD card for size comparison)

Dot-S (ドッツ, styled as .S) also known as Dot-Pin is a toy, similar to a Lite-Brite, created in 2005 by Japanese company Tomytec. The toys allow for the creation of pictures by placing colored pegs into holes in one or more boards. Many sets allow for the creation of various sprite characters from classic video games, with each peg representing one pixel.

== Kits ==
There are 56 kits, including a starter kit which contains 17 colors. Many of sets are licensed from popular franchises. Some of the kits are listed below.

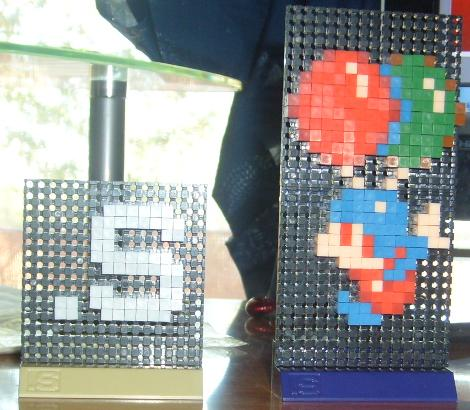
A dot-S freelance model

=== Disney ===
- Donald Duck
- Jack Skellington
- Mickey Mouse (black and white, color versions)
- Minnie Mouse (black and white, color versions)
- Stitch

=== Namco ===
- Dig Dug
- Mappy
- Pac-Man
- The Tower of Druaga
- Xevious

=== Nintendo ===
- Balloon Fight
- Ice Climber
- The Legend of Zelda (two sets, including "King of Games" set))
- Nintendo Classics
- Super Mario Bros. (Mario and Luigi, also available in large sets)

=== Other ===
- Doko Demo Issyo (Sony Computer Entertainment, two sets)
- Space Invaders (Taito)
