= Mr. Machine =

Mechanical toy

Mr. Machine is a once-popular children's mechanical toy originally manufactured by the Ideal Toy Company in 1960.

== History ==
Mr. Machine was designed by Marvin Glass, the toy designer, known for many popular 1960s and 1970s toys. The story goes that Marvin Glass was working so hard at the time, his wife said he was like a machine. Soon after her comment, he invented Mr. Machine. Mr. Machine was a robot-like mechanical man wearing a top hat. The body had a giant windup key at the back. When the toy was wound up it would "walk", swinging its arms and repeatedly ringing a bell mounted on its front. The toy stood about 18 inches tall (roughly 46 cm).

Mr. Machine was primarily made of plastic. This was unique for its time. Innovations in plastic and injection moulding allowed toy manufacturers to produce parts less expensively than previous manufacturing techniques. Packaged as a building kit, the box contained 44 individual pieces along with a plastic wrench. Once assembled, Mr. Machine was complete with a top hat, bell, swinging arms, and an articulated jaw. The toy's clockwork mechanism of wheels and gears could be seen through its transparent plastic body. Mr. Machine “walked” forward as his arms and legs moved and his mouth opened and closed as its internal gears turned.

The gimmick of Mr. Machine was that one could not only see all of his mechanical "innards" through his clear plastic body, but one could also take the toy apart and put it back together, over and over, like a Lego toy or a jigsaw puzzle.

Mr. Machine was one of Ideal's most popular toys. The company reissued it in 1978, but with some alterations: it could no longer be taken apart (owing to the tendency of very young children to put small pieces in their mouths which could be accidentally swallowed or present a choking hazard), and instead of ringing a bell, it now whistled "This Old Man". This later version of Mr. Machine was brought back once more in the 1980s. In 2004, the Poof-Slinky Company remanufactured the original 1960 version (using the actual Ideal molds whenever possible), which made the original sounds and could be disassembled, and with the intention of being marketed to nostalgic adults as a collectible.
