= Pretty Pretty Princess =

Board game

- The cover of the 1990's edition of the game.
- Designers: Elizabeth Pacza
- Publishers: Western Publishing Group (1990-1994); Hasbro (1994-Present)
- Publication: 1990; 36 years ago
- Genres: Board game
- Players: 2-4
- Playing time: 10 minutes or more
- Age range: 4+

Pretty Pretty Princess is a role-playing board game designed for children, characterized by its fantasy theme. It aims to engage young players through a narrative that incorporates elements of fantasy and dress-up. Originally created in 1989 by Elizabeth Pacza, a designer at the Chicago-based firm Meyer/Glass Design, Ltd., the game was licensed to Western Publishing Group and officially released in 1990. Hasbro acquired the property in 1994 as part of its purchase of the games unit of Western.

== Summary of play ==
Pretty Pretty Princess is a turn-based board game for two to four players, each of whom selects one of four available colors (blue, pink, green, purple) at the outset. Players spin a spinner to decide who will start, then take turns spinning and moving around the board and following the directions for the spaces on which they land. The goal is to collect pieces of jewelry in the chosen color; spaces may call for a player to take a specific piece, take any one piece, or discard one piece. One crown and one black ring are included, which can be passed between players or discarded. In order to win the game, a player must hold both the crown and a full set of jewelry in their color, but not the black ring.

== History ==
Pretty Pretty Princess was created in 1989 by Elizabeth Pacza, a designer at the Chicago-based firm Meyer/Glass Design, Ltd. The game was originally licensed to Western Publishing Group in 1989, where Peggy Brown handled internal development until the game was officially released in 1990. Hasbro acquired the property in 1994 as part of its purchase of the games unit of Western. Hasbro marketed the game under its Milton Bradley imprint until 2009.

Multiple special editions of Pretty Pretty Princess have been produced, including licensed Disney variants such as Sleeping Beauty and Cinderella versions. As of 2014, the game was not in print, although "Pretty Pretty Princess" was still a registered trademark of Hasbro, Inc. Hasbro licensed the game to Winning Moves in 2018. In 2020, the game was released with new packaging and is available at a majority of retailers by Hasbro, with the original packaging available at the Winning Moves website.
