= Unimorph =

Cantilever type

Unimorph cantilever

A unimorph or monomorph is a cantilever that consists of one active layer and one inactive layer. In the case where active layer is piezoelectric, deformation in that layer may be induced by the application of an electric field. This deformation induces a bending displacement in the cantilever. The inactive layer may be fabricated from a non-piezoelectric material. Expanded URL for Paper referenced is located here: https://people.eecs.berkeley.edu/~ronf/PAPERS/sitti-icra01.pdf

== See also ==
- Bimorph
