= Marvin Glass and Associates =

Chicago toy firm, 1941–1988

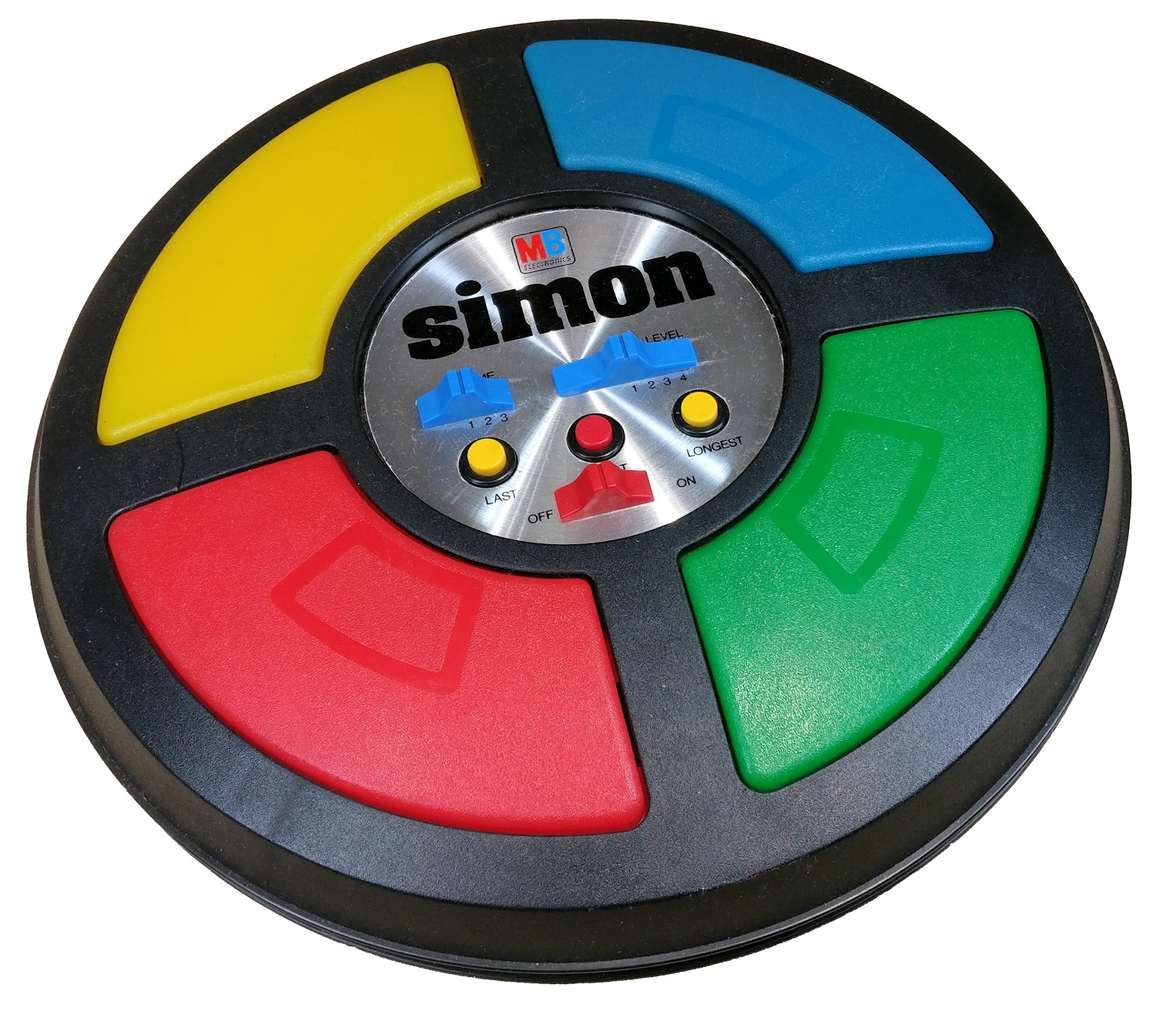
Simon, one of numerous games designed by Marvin Glass and Associates

Marvin Glass and Associates (MGA) was a toy design and engineering firm based in Chicago. Marvin Glass (1914–1974) and his employees created some of the most successful toys and games of the twentieth century such as Mr. Machine, Rock 'Em Sock 'Em Robots, Lite Brite, Ants in the Pants, Mouse Trap, Operation, Simon, Body Language, and the Evel Knievel Stunt Cycle.

== History ==
Marvin Glass and Associates was founded in 1941. Its founder, Marvin Glass, was an entrepreneur and the creative force behind Marvin Glass and Associates. His salesmanship and uncanny ability to spark creativity in the designers he employed was unparalleled. In 1949, he licensed a "novelty item" to H. Fishlove & Company called Yakity Yak Talking Teeth. This item was invented by Eddy Goldfarb, who worked with Marvin Glass for a very short time after World War II.

The first big hit for Marvin Glass was Mr. Machine, a toy invented by a former watchmaker named Leo Kripak. A child could take Mr. Machine apart and put him back together. It was licensed to Ideal Toys and became such a hit that Lionel Weintraub, its president, made it his company mascot and featured it in many of Ideal's early TV ads. The company became so successful that Marvin Glass got his company logo printed on every package for the items it invented and licensed.

The organization's general counsel, James F. Coffee, and accountant Ernest Sonderling, were the architects of the successful business model whereby the designs and inventions were patented and licensed to various toy companies and manufacturers who would pay running royalties based on sales. Outside counsel, chairman and founder of the Intellectual Property Department at McDermott Will & Emery, Robert J. Schneider, was responsible for procuring the patents and protecting them from infringement. Mr. Schneider is currently co-chair of the Intellectual Property Department of Taft, Stettinius & Hollister LLP.

Joseph M. Burck was a senior designer at Marvin Glass through the mid-1960s to early 1980s and invented or designed many of MGA's hottest items such as Inch Worm, Lite-Brite, Astrolite, Which Witch, Masterpiece, SSP Racers, Chu-Bops, and the Evel Knievel line of toys (Burck was Knievel's personal guest at the infamous Snake River Canyon jump.) Burck holds 10 US patents for items developed by MGA. Time Magazine named Lite-Brite one of the top 100 toys of all time.

Marvin Glass died in 1974. Two years later, managing partner Anson Isaacson, partner Joseph Callan and designer Kathy Dunn were shot and killed and two others seriously wounded at the company's offices in Chicago. The perpetrator was 33-year-old Albert Keller, a designer suffering from paranoid delusions who then killed himself.

MGA was contracted by Bally-Midway to design coin-operated video games during the 1980s. Some of the games produced by MGA during this era include Tapper, Domino Man and Timber.

The company continued in operation until 1988. Several partners from Marvin Glass and Associates subsequently started Chicago-based Big Monster Toys.

== Designs ==
Year	Product	Manufacturer
1959	Tic Toy Clock	Ideal
1960	Mr. Machine	Ideal
1961	Great Garloo	Marx
1961	PopZaBall	Mattel
1961	Robot Commando	Ideal
1962	Bop the Beetle	Ideal
1962	Gaylord	Ideal
1962	Golferino	Hasbro
1962	King Zor	Ideal
1963	Ambush!	Hasbro
1963	Dandy the Lion	Irwin
1963	Jungle Hunt	Milton Bradley
1963	King of the Hill	Schaper Toys
1963	Mouse Trap	Ideal
1963	Penny the Poodle	Marx
1964	Clancy the Great	Ideal
1964	Crazy Clock	Ideal
1964	Interior Decorator Set	Irwin
1964	Perils of Pauline	Marx
1964	Rock 'Em Sock 'Em Robots	Marx
1964	Time Bomb	Milton Bradley
1965	American Flyer All Aboard Sets	Gilbert
1965	Fish Bait	Ideal
1965	James Bond 007 Action Toys	Gilbert
1965	Mystery Date	Milton Bradley
1965	Operation	Milton Bradley
1965	Tigeroo Bike Siren	Ideal
1966	Babysitter Game	Ideal
1966	Mosquito	Milton Bradley
1966	Thing Ding	Schaper Toys
1967	Careful	Ideal
1967	Clean Sweep	Schaper Toys
1967	Fang Bang	Milton Bradley
1967	Lite Brite	Hasbro
1967	That Kid Doll	Hasbro
1968	Big Mouth	Schaper Toys
1968	Bucket of Fun	Milton Bradley
1968	Little Lost Baby	Ideal
1968	Sand Lot Slugger	Milton Bradley
1968	Situation 4	Parker Brothers
1969	Ants in the Pants	Ideal / Schaper Toys
1969	Astro Sound	Hasbro
1969	AstroLite	Hasbro
1969	Dynamite Shack	Milton Bradley
1969	Finders Keepers	Cardinal
1969	Humor Rumor	Whitman
1969	Sketch a Toon	Unknown
1970	Brink Ball	Lakeside
1970	Mad Marbles	Lakeside
1970	Mind Maze	Parker Brothers
1970	Mr. Mad	Ideal
1970	Rattle Battle	Parker Brothers
1970	Snoopy and the Red Baron	Milton Bradley
1970	SSP	Kenner
1970	The Tiny Tim of Beautiful Things	Parker Brothers
1970	Twiddler	Parker Brothers
1970	The Wall Walker	Kenner
1970	Which Witch?	Milton Bradley
1971	Alley Up	Hasbro
1971	Gnip Gnop	Parker Brothers
1971	Inchworm	Parker Brothers
1971	Masterpiece	Parker Brothers
1971	Smash Up Derby	Kenner
1971	Stay Alive	Milton Bradley
1972	Big M-X	Matchbox
1972	Blythe Doll	Kenner
1972	Bops 'n Robbers	Marx
1972	Don't Blow Your Top	Schaper Toys
1972	Skittle Horseshoes	Aurora
1973	Flip It	Aurora
1973	Silly Sammy	Marx
1973	Super Sunday Football	Hasbro
1974	Body Language	Milton Bradley
1974	Evel Knievel Stunt Game	Ideal
1974	Fighting Furies pirate action figures	Matchbox
1974	The Inventors	Parker Brothers
1974	Jack Be Nimble	Schaper Toys
1974	The Miss America Pageant	Parker Brothers
1974	Planet of the Apes	Milton Bradley
1974	Ricochet Racers	Hasbro
1974	Trip Hammer	Milton Bradley
1974	Tug Boat	Parker Brothers
1975	Hugo: Man of a Thousand Faces	Kenner
1975	Shrunken Head Apple Sculpture kit	Milton Bradley
1974	Electronic Table Tennis	Ideal
1977	Mister Rogers' Neighborhood Puppets & Trolley	Ideal
1978	Laser Attack	Milton Bradley
1978	Simon	Milton Bradley
1979	Maniac	Ideal
1979	Super Simon	Milton Bradley
1980	Chu-Bops	Amurol
1981	4 wheel drive toy used in Attak Trak (Masters of the Universe)	Mattel
1982	Stuff Yer Face	Milton Bradley
1985	Rocks Bugs and Things	Ideal
1988	C.O.P.s and Crooks	Hasbro
1988	Smoochees	Fisher-Price Toys
