= Which Witch? (board game) =

Children's board game

- Other names: Haunted House; Ghost Castle
- Publishers: Milton Bradley; Denys Fisher
- Publication: 1970; 56 years ago
- Years active: 2–4
- Genres: Board game
- Languages: English
- Players: 2–4
- Playing time: 45'
- Age range: 6+

Which Witch? is a children's board game published in 1970 by the Milton Bradley Company, and was invented by Joseph M. Burck of Marvin Glass and Associates. The board represents a haunted house with four large rooms: the Broom Room, the Witchin' Kitchen, the Spell Cell and the Bat's Ballroom, assembled before play into a three-dimensional model house with vertical walls, and a large plastic chimney in the center. There are four tokens, colored red, yellow, blue and green. Each token is shaped like a child, either a boy or a girl, with four corresponding mouse tokens of identical color.

== Overview ==
In each turn, each player rolls a single die to determine movement distance along a tiled track through the rooms. Several tiles are "danger" squares because they are in the path of the game's "whammy ball", a steel ball dropped into the central chimney that falls randomly into one of the rooms. The end of the track in the Bat's Ballroom is the "Charmed Circle". The player to reach the Charmed Circle first wins the game.

After rolling the die, a player draws a card from a deck. Each card is imprinted with one of three witches: Ghoulish Gertie, Wanda The Wicked and Glenda The Good. Drawing a Ghoulish Gertie card instructs player to drop the whammy ball into the chimney; if any player's token is knocked off the track by the ball, it must be returned to the start square for that room. Drawing the Wanda the Wicked card requires that the player's token be replaced with a mouse; a mouse cannot move from its current tile until the same player draws a Glenda The Good card, which allows the player to reclaim the original child token.

A version of the game was released as a tie-in to the animated television series, The Real Ghostbusters, with identical play mechanics but Ghostbusters characters and cards. Which Witch? was sold as Haunted House by Denys Fisher and later as Ghost Castle in the UK.

== Reviews ==
- Games & Puzzles #7
