= Bimorph =

Bimorph cantilevers used as micromechanical linear actuator: 1 - substrate 2 - piezoelectric layer 3 - passive layer 4 - mechanical contact area 5 - track

A bimorph is a cantilever used for actuation or sensing which consists of two active layers. It can also have a passive layer between the two active layers. In contrast, a piezoelectric unimorph has only one active (i.e. piezoelectric) layer and one passive (i.e. non-piezoelectric) layer.

== Piezoelectric bimorph ==
The term bimorph is most commonly used with piezoelectric bimorphs. In actuator applications, one active layer contracts and the other expands if voltage is applied, thus the bimorph bends. In sensing applications, bending the bimorph produces voltage which can for example be used to measure displacement or acceleration. This mode can also be used for energy harvesting.

== Bimetal bimorph ==
A bimetal could be regarded as a thermally activated bimorph. The first theory about the bending of thermally activated bimorphs was given by Stoney. Newer developments also enabled electrostatically activated bimorphs for the use in microelectromechanical systems.

== See also ==
- Shape-memory alloy
