= Momoko Doll =

Japanese Fashion Doll

Momoko Doll (モモコドール) is a 1/6 scale (27 cm, 10.6 inch) Japanese fashion doll, roughly similar in size to Robert Tonner's Tiny Kitty Collier.

== History ==
Momoko was created in 2001 as a side project by a Japanese software company called PetWORKs. (The creator was Namie Manabe (真鍋 奈見江), the art director.)

In 2004, PetWORKs handed the line over to doll-making firm Sekiguchi. Sekiguchi altered the doll somewhat and turned it into a mass-market item competitively priced with other fashion dolls, but retained the general concept of an "everyday" modern woman one might find walking down the street in Japan.

PetWORKs continues to produce a limited number of Momokos every year in their Close-Clipped Sheep (CCS) line, using the Sekiguchi body but a slightly different face paint style, and sometimes a slightly different head.

== Description ==
The Momoko doll, like most Asian fashion dolls, has visible joints and good flexibility, able to tilt and rotate her head, bend and rotate the elbows, bend the knees, slightly flex and bend near the waist, flex the wrists and ankles, and so on. The Momoko doll is able to stand on her own without help, though a white metal stand is included.

Momoko outfits display a characteristic normality and simple elegance in a range of styles, such as a variety of modern casual looks, typical Japanese school girl uniforms, Japanese office lady style, Western bridal gowns, Japanese summer yukata, and a variety of other looks. In addition to the main line of doll releases, Sekiguchi also releases numerous special edition dolls with apparently even more limited availability. These include such things as Isetan special Momokos, or collaboration pieces such as Gainax Momoko dolls.

== Market ==
Momoko has the same Asian target market as the highly popular Blythe and Pullip dolls, and is able to wear most Asian and some American fashion doll outfits, including a number of 1/6 scale Pullip, Jenny, Azone, Obitsu, Annz, Barbie My Scene, and other such products. Although Momoko's audience is largely female, a few Momokos (such as one of the schoolgirl dolls) have had male purchasers.

As with other Asian doll fans, Momoko fans are known for proudly posting photographs of the doll posed in different clothing styles, in different situations, and in different countries.

Mame Momokos (豆momoko: literally, "bean" or "mini" Momokos) are cheaper and cartoony 9 cm (3.5 inch) dolls meant to allow Momoko creators the chance to inexpensively explore wild new outfits. Unlike their taller cousins, Mame Momoko dolls come in male and female, though there are no anatomical differences to speak of.

== Ruruko Doll ==
In October 2013, PetWORKs debuted Ruruko as Momoko's little sister, a brand new line of dolls that introduced kids fashion for a smaller 20 cm (8 inch) body. Much like PetWORKs' current CCS line of Momoko dolls, each new release of Ruruko is made in very limited quantity and direct from the dollmakers themselves. Instead of a Sekiguchi body, Ruruko uses the smallest 1/6 scale doll body from Azone (ja:アゾンインターナショナル), known as the Pure Neemo XS. This body makes Ruruko roughly similar in size to Japan's most popular dress-up doll, Takara's Licca-chan.

== See also ==
- Asian fashion doll
