= Pullip =

Fashion doll

A customized Pullip doll

Pullip (Korean: 푸리프) is a fashion doll created by Cheonsang Cheonha of South Korea in 2003. Pullip has a jointed plastic body (1:6 scale) and a relatively oversized head (1:3 scale), with eyes that can move from side to side and eyelids that can blink. Pullip was first marketed by Jun Planning out of Japan; but the company underwent management changes in early 2009 and, since then, has operated out of South Korea under the name Groove. Since the release of the original female doll, other companion dolls have been added: male dolls Namu (나무, tree) (Namu is not on the market anymore) and Taeyang (태양, sun); Taeyang's younger sister, Dal (달, moon); Dal's best friend, Byul (별, star); and Pullip's younger brother, Isul (이슬, dew). In February 2013, a new member of the Pullip family was introduced, called Yeolume (열매, berry/fruit), who is Pullip's future daughter. There is also a miniature line called Little Pullip, with 1:12 scale bodies and 1:6 scale heads. Pullip and her counterpart dolls are often customized by collectors, with the most common customizations including wig changes, eye color changes and rebodying.

== Design ==
Pullip dolls have a unique eye movement mechanism that allows their eyes to move from side to side and their eyelids to blink, all via levers on the back of the head. Pullips released after January 2008 can not only blink but also keep their eyes closed via these levers. Pullip has an articulated body and can be easily customized. Standing at 12 inches tall, Pullip's body is about 9 inches tall and is on the 1:6 scale, while her oversized head is about 3 inches tall and on the 1:3 scale. With a 1:6 scale body, Pullip is approximately the size of many popular playscale fashion dolls, such as Barbie and Jenny. Pullip can sometimes wear playscale doll clothing and shoes. However, the 1:3 scale of her relatively oversized head is approximately the same size as many larger or SD-sized ball-jointed doll heads.

=== Body types ===
Pullip's highly articulated stock body has gone through several changes over the years. Early Pullips—the first 10 releases from July to December 2003—had what is called the Type 1 body, which was a Marmit-style action figure body with visible screws. The first three Pullip releases (Wind/Debut, Street, and Moon) have necks that can snap easily under the weight of the oversized Pullip head, but this fragile neck problem was corrected with later releases. Another common problem with the Type 1 body is vertical splitting between the two halves of the legs. All Pullips released on the Type 1 body have rooted hair.

Starting in January 2004 with the release of Pullip Venus, a new stock body was introduced. The Type 2 body had a soft torso, no visible screws, and joints that could be pulled apart. This body had more realistic proportions and, to date, is the most posable, flexible, and articulated Pullip stock body ever released. The primary disadvantage of this body is that the soft plastic torso causes chemical melt on the hard plastic limbs and pieces that remain in contact with it, including the hip joint/lower torso piece and the ball joints of the shoulders. If measures are not actively taken to prevent it, the soft torso can also cause a ring of chemical melt around the neck hole in Pullip's head. Although chemical melt is the most widely recognized problem with the Type 2 body, it is not known whether environmental conditions (heat, humidity) exacerbate the melt. Other common problems with the Type 2 body are that limbs can fall off or pull apart too easily and that the soft torso can pop out of the hip joint. Only the first three Pullips released on a Type 2 body (Venus, Savon, and Nomado) have rooted hair; all subsequent releases, starting with Arietta in March 2004, have glued-on wigs, which can be removed and changed if desired.

With the dual release of Lan Ake and Lan Ai in August 2005, the next stock body, the Type 3, was introduced. Relative to the Type 2 body, the Type 3 had less articulation; a smaller, more juvenile sculpt; and hinged wrist and ankle joints. While sturdier than its predecessors, the Type 3 was the least posable stock body and remains so even today. Many Pullip collectors expressed displeasure with the Type 3 body, especially after having grown accustomed to the superior aesthetics and possibility of the Type 2. The most common problem with the Type 3 body is wrist cracking, which was prevalent with the Pullips released after January 2007, starting with Stica. Additionally, the leg and knee joints on the Type 3 body often make a creaking noise when bent.

In January 2009 with the release of Neo Noir, another Pullip stock body was introduced: the Type 4, which is still in production today. This body is more posable than the Type 3 and uses peg-and-hole joints to prevent the wrist cracking that occurred with the Type 3 body. Common problems with the Type 4 body are stiff, creaky joints; knees that can bend backwards; and loose-fitting pegs at the wrist and knee, causing limbs to easily slip apart. The vertical leg split that occurred with Type 1 bodies can also sometimes occur at the knees of the Type 4 body.

== Releases ==
New editions of Pullip dolls are released on a monthly basis. Additional limited-release exclusives are sold occasionally. Each doll has a unique name with distinct face makeup (called a "faceup"), hair, outfit, accessories, collector's card, doll stand and box. (Some of the earliest Pullips did not come with a collector's card or a doll stand.)

Between 2003 and 2014, there have been over 220 Pullip doll releases. The regular monthly releases of Pullip are limited in that only a certain amount are produced; this number is known only by the manufacturer.

Occasionally, a limited-edition, exclusive Pullip will be made in a quantity between 300 and 2000 and will be sold in addition to the regular monthly release. In early 2006, with the release of limited-edition Fall Purezza, Jun Planning announced that it would no longer produce exclusive Pullips because their sales cannibalized the demand for the regular monthly releases. However, the company apparently changed their mind in early 2007 with the release of the first US store exclusive, Haute LA, by HauteDoll, which was later followed by multiple Japan exclusives. Some stores that have had these exclusive Pullips are Toys-R-Us Japan, who sold Vivien in November 2004; Magma Heritage, in Singapore, who sold Bianca, Oren and Mitzi in 2004; HauteDoll, in Los Angeles and New York, who sold Haute LA and Haute NY in 2007; TBS shop, in Japan, who sold Kirakishou in September 2007 as well as a limited version of Sparrow and (new) Shinku in March 2014; and pullip.net, in South Korea. Until September 2007, the limited-release exclusive dolls came with a certificate showing their production number; however, as of 2014, certificates are included only sporadically with the exclusives/limited-edition dolls.

Prior to 2006, Jun Planning released some editions that bore close resemblance to popular characters and celebrities but are not officially licensed. Fantastic Alice is similar to Disney's rendition of Alice in Wonderland. Rida bears resemblance to Nana. The "Happy Birthday #2" set includes a Native American Pullip named Sacagawea and Namu named Geronimo.

In anticipation of the 5th anniversary of Pullip in 2008, five dolls were released as part of the "Another Alice" limited-edition series, including Another Alice, Another Queen, Another King (Taeyang), Another Rabbit (Dal), and Another Clock Rabbit (Dal). Only 500 of each of these dolls were produced. This series was inspired by Alice in Wonderland. Their original release date was postponed in order to include the updated eye-closing feature on Taeyang Another King, and the series ended up being released in August 2007. Collectors who ordered the complete set received a bonus flamingo figurine.

=== Collaborations and licensed releases ===
In 2006, Jun Planning began releasing licensed Pullips based on the characters from the anime/manga Rozen Maiden series. With the exception of the final Rozen Maiden Pullip, Kirakishou (which was an exclusive to TBS/Japan), the Rozen Maiden dolls were not limited editions.

Since 2007, several Pullip dolls have been released through fashion and design-based collaborations, such as with designer H. Naoto; clothing brand SunaUna; Lolita fashion houses Angelic Pretty and Baby, The Stars Shine Bright; and doll customizers Kanihoru, Mitsubachi@BabyBee, Silver Butterfly, Sheryl Designs and PoisonGirl.

Several other Pullip dolls have been released through commercial collaborations to portray well-known fictional characters, including Hello Kitty and My Melody from Sanrio; Rei Ayanami and Asuka Langley Soryu from Neon Genesis Evangelion; Grell, Sebastian and Ciel from Black Butler; Angelique Limoges, Rayne, and Erenfried from Neo Angelique Abyss; Peter Pan, Captain Hook, Tinkerbell and Tiger Lily from Disney's Peter Pan film; and Dumbo and Pinocchio from their eponymous Disney films. Three Pullips have been based on characters in Audrey Hepburn films, including Holly, from Breakfast at Tiffany's; Princess Ann, from the film Roman Holiday; and Sabrina, from the film Sabrina. Several Pullips released from 2011–2014 were based on Vocaloid characters.

The majority of these collaborations have not been exclusive or limited-edition dolls, but they do have higher MSRPs than conventional releases because of licensing costs.

== Pullip's companions ==
=== Namu ===
Namu was the first male counterpart to Pullip and his character was introduced as her boyfriend. Namu was 34 cm tall and had an oversized head (1:3 scale, like Pullip) and an articulated body. Also like Pullip, Namu's eyes can be moved from side to side and his eyelids can blink via levers on the back of the head. He can be customized similar to Pullip dolls. Clothing for Namu can be exchanged with many 1:6 action figures and dolls, including the modern Ken doll.

There were seven versions of Namu released between 2004 and 2005. The first Namu, called Vispo, had rooted hair, similar to the early Pullips; however, all subsequent Namu releases had glued-on wigs. Jun Planning retired Namu in 2005 under the story that he and Pullip had "broken up." The final Namu, released in May 2005, was "Happy Birthday Namu #2," also called Geronimo and came in a set together with Pullip Sacagawea. In 2006, a new male doll called Taeyang replaced Namu.

=== Taeyang ===
Taeyang was introduced in February 2006 as Pullip's new boyfriend, replacing Namu. The first Taeyang released was named MJ and was intended as a counterpart to Pullip Rida. Taeyang's body is the same as his predecessor, Namu, but his face and head sculpt are different, with a wider jaw and blunter chin. Like Pullip, Taeyang has eyes that move from side to side, and eyelids that can blink and close, via levers on the back of his head. Starting with Taeyang Hash in August 2007, Taeyang's eyelids could remain closed via these levers. Taeyang can be customized, just like Pullip can, with the ability to change his hair, eyes, faceup, and body. He stands 36 cm tall and can exchange clothes with many 1:6 action figures and dolls, including the modern Ken doll. Taeyang is released on a bi-monthly basis by Jun Planning.

Since 2006, Jun Planning has released six to seven versions of Taeyang each year, with more than 50 different releases in total. Some of the Taeyang dolls bear close resemblance to popular characters and celebrities. Taeyang Edward Scissorhands is licensed from Tim Burton's eponymous character. Taeyang Shade bears close resemblance to Sherlock Holmes. Taeyang Another King was inspired by the King of Hearts from the Alice in Wonderland story.

=== Dal ===
Dal was introduced in October 2006, with the first three versions–Drta, Fiori and Monomono–released concurrently. Dal is profiled as Taeyang's 13-year-old sister, who considers Pullip to be her rival in terms of fashion and style. Just as Pullip is approximately the size of 1:6 scale fashion dolls like Barbie and Jenny, Dal is similar in size to "little sister"-type dolls such as Skipper and Licca. Dal is 26.3 cm in height and, when standing next to Pullip, comes up to her shoulder.

Dal's body articulation is similar to Pullip's. Her eyes move from side to side, but they do not close. Dals can be customized, just like Pullips and Taeyangs. Jun Planning announced in the beginning of 2008 that a new Dal would be released every month. Since then, the manufacturer has occasionally skipped a few months between releases; however, to date, there have been more than 75 Dals released in total.

=== Byul ===
Byul was introduced in December 2008, with the first version named Eris. Byul shares the Dal body type but has a different face sculpt. She is profiled as Dal's 13-year-old best friend who has secretly lost her heart to Isul, Pullip's little brother. Just like Dals, Byuls cannot close their eyes, and their height is 26.3 cm. A new Byul is released approximately every two to five months. Since 2008, there have been more than 25 Byul releases.

=== Isul ===
Isul is Pullip's 15-year-old brother and was first released in February 2011. The debut Isul was named Apollo and was part of the Steampunk series of Pullip dolls. Like Pullip, Isul has eyes that can move from side to side and eyelids that can blink and close via levers on the back of the head. Isul is profiled as a high school student in San Francisco who likes to play soccer. As a prodigy, he is a fan of reading university literature. In personality, he is said to be very calm, tender and helpful. Isul is 29.5 cm tall. Isul is released approximately once per month, but the Groove sometimes skips a month or two between releases. Since 2011, there have been more than 30 Isul releases.

=== Yeolume ===
Released in February 2013, Yeolume is Pullip's future daughter and the newest addition to the Pullip line of dolls. Yeolume is 26 cm tall, and the first release, named Podo, wears a school uniform with a pink and blue bow. According to her biography on the official Pullip website, Yeolume is 10 years old and is an elementary school student.

Yeolume is approximately the same size as Dal and, like Dal and Byul, her eyes moves from side to side but cannot close. However, unlike Dal and Byul, the design of Yeloume's body is very different: she has minimal articulation points, and her body somewhat resembles a Little Pullip (though larger in size) or a Blythe doll. However, Yeolume's arms and legs do bend and she can be posed to a certain extent. Like the other dolls in the Pullip line, Yeolume is customizable and her body can easily be swapped for a sturdier, more flexible body (e.g., a Pure Neemo or Obitsu body).

=== Little Pullip ===
Little Pullip is a miniature version of Pullip, with a 1:12 scale body and a 1:6 scale head. Often called a "mini," these little versions stand about 4.5 inches tall. Little Pullips lack articulated elbows or knee joints, their shoes are painted on, and their eyes do not move or blink. Despite their small size and limited articulation points, they are still somewhat customizable: they can be given new wigs, bodies, eye colors, and makeup.

Several editions of Little Pullip are miniature replica of full-sized Pullip dolls with similar name, clothes, hair, and makeup, such as Principessa, Cornice, and Mir. The Little Pullips who happen to not be modeled after a full-sized doll are unique to the Little Pullip line, such as Riletto, Aloalo, and Miss Green. The only Pullip doll that was first released as a Little Pullip and later released as a larger, full-sized doll was Pullip Froggy. There have been themed releases for the Little Pullip line that are distinct and completely separate from the full-sized releases, including the Western astrological signs and the Bremen Town Musicians.

Little Pullips were first introduced in January 2005 with the release of Moon, a miniature replica of the full-sized Pullip doll of the same name. Production of Little Pullips stopped in March 2007 but resumed in October 2009 under the name Little Pullip +. The primary difference between the original line and the Plus line is that the latter dolls have a ball-jointed head that can swivel and tilt to different angles, allowing for more expressiveness than the original Little Pullip head, which could only turn from side to side along a single axis.

There are also Little Taeyangs, Little Dals and Little Byuls that are part of the Little Pullip line. The Docolla line (a portmanteau of "doll" + "collaboration") was released as an extension of the Little Pullip + line, beginning in July 2011 with the release of miniature Pullip Grell from Black Butler.

== Related Merchandise ==
=== Pullip Costume ===
Pullip Costume/Fashion are clothes and accessories sold by Jun Planning for Pullip dolls. This includes complete costumes, articles of clothing, and accessories. Pullip Costume items are released sporadically.

=== Petit Luxury ===
Petit Luxury are display furniture for Pullip released by Jun Planning of Japan, starting in January 2008. This includes classic French armchairs and other pieces in resin.

=== Magazine ===
In July 2005, Jun Planning authorized "Pullip Magazine," a book that is 88 pages long and written in Japanese. The magazine book includes the full catalog of each Pullip released up to that point, concepts, interviews with the designers, collaborations with popular clothing lines, guides on customizing Pullips, and outfit patterns of brand-name fashion designs.

In August 2010 a second book, entitled "Pullip Complete Style" and again printed in Japanese, became available to purchase on its own and as part of a special box set with limited-edition Pullip Bonita. This book is 133 pages and features photographs of all the Pullip releases from 2003 to autumn 2010.

== Customizing ==
Like the more expensive ball-jointed dolls, Pullips are easily customizable. Pullips released prior to March 2004 had rooted hair, but their scalp pieces can be swapped with each other. Beginning in March 2004, all dolls in the Pullip line–starting with Pullip Arietta and Namu Trunk–were released with removable wigs, thus allowing their hair to be changed more easily.

Pullip and her companions can be given new bodies in a process called rebodying. Popular rebodying options include 1:6 scale bodies made by companies such as Obitsu, Volks, and Pure Neemo. Some collectors prefer to rebody with 1:6 scale action figure bodies or with playline doll bodies, such from Barbie or Liv dolls.

All dolls in the Pullip line have heads and eye mechanisms that can be taken apart with a screwdriver. Customization changes range from minor, such as new wigs or eye colors, to major, including new faceups and fully custom dolls with completely new designs. More intensive customization can include resculpting the face or body, piercings and body jewelry (which can be done either with glue on the surface of the doll or with a small drill to make a permanent hole), and painted or carved tattoos.

== Controversy ==
The Pullip release originally scheduled for July 2005 was called Beressa, a "lady spy," who came with a black uniform and cap with gold braids and red details, including a red arm band and a pistol. Although no swastikas were visible on the doll or in photographs, the resemblance of the uniform and gun design bore a close resemblance to German SS officer uniforms. Jun Planning announced the cancellation of Beressa out of respect for the 60th anniversary of the Holocaust. Lan Ake, the Pullip that was created to replace Beressa, was delayed by a month; consequently, Jun Planning ended up not releasing a Pullip during July 2005 and instead released Lan Ake and Lan Ai together in August 2005.

== See also ==
- Asian fashion doll
- Ball-jointed doll
