= Joy and Tom Studios =

American entertainment and art company

- Industry: Statues and Collectibles
- Founded: 1983
- Founder: Joy and Tom Snyder
- Headquarters: Sanford, Florida, USA
- Services: Sculpting, Design, Molding, Painting
- Website: http://www.joyandtomstudios.com/

Joy and Tom Studios, Inc. produces hand sculpted prototypes for the pre-painted statues and collectibles industry. The company, located in Sanford, Florida, was founded in 1983 by Joy and Tom Snyder. Their portfolio of work consists of many statues, busts, and portraits based on licensed properties from companies such as Disney, Warner Brothers, Marvel Comics, DC Comics, and others. In addition to their work in the collectibles industry, they have produced many sculpted and painted likenesses that have appeared on the stop-motion animated program Robot Chicken on Cartoon Network's Adult Swim.

== History ==
Joy and Tom Snyder met while attending art school at Ringling College of Art and Design in Sarasota, Florida where they both majored in fine art. After graduating from art school in 1983, they married on June 4 of the same year and later formed Joy and Tom Studios, where they would provide artistic services in a number of different fields, including family portraiture and graphic design. In the early 1990s they were approached about sculpting their first resin garage kit which marked the beginning of long, diverse sculpting careers for the artists.

== Services ==
Joy and Tom Studios' sculpted works range in scale from 6" action figures to life size statues. They work in several forms of sculpting media, including Super-Sculpey, Apoxy-Sculpt, Castilene, wax, fiberglass, and Styrofoam. Their prototyping work also includes molding, build-up, and paint-mastering services.

== Statues and Collectibles ==
During the mid-to-late 1990s, Joy and Tom continued to do freelance sculpting work in the garage kit industry through their studio. These projects eventually led to their company obtaining sculpting work on prototypes for licensed statues and collectibles from several notable companies that produce licensed collectibles.

Below is a partial list of some of Joy and Tom Studios' clients:

* Walt Disney Co.	* Warner Brothers
* Universal Studios	* Cartoon Network
* F.A.O. Schwartz	* Dynamic Forces
* Bowen Designs	* ReelArt Studios
* Tonner Doll Company	* Art Asylum
* Diamond Select Toys	* Plastic Earth
* Monogram International	* Amok Time
* Sci-Fi Metropolis	* Executive Replicas
* Go Hero

== Licensed Work ==
Since beginning to work in the collectibles industry, Joy and Tom Studios have had their services utilized for a number of projects involving notable licenses from comics, television, and film. For many projects, Joy and Tom work directly with the owner of the license throughout the sculpting process to assure that the finished product meets their exact specifications. Below is a partial list of some of the many licenses Joy and Tom Studios have worked with:

* Disney	* Warner Brothers
* DC Comics	* Marvel Comics
* Star Wars	* Star Trek
* Pirates of the Caribbean	* Harry Potter
* Battlestar Galactica	* Lost in Space
* Romero's Dead series	* The Golden Compass
* Tarzan	* Zorro
* Red Sonja	* Lone Ranger
* Buck Rogers	* Prince Valiant
* The Phantom	* Grendel
* Sheena	* Jungle Girl

== 2D Translation ==
Many of the collectibles that Joy and Tom Studios sculpt involve translating the work of notable comic book artists and illustrators into 3-dimensional statues. In many instances the original artist provides art direction as the statues are being made and is responsible for giving their final approval upon completion of the project.

Below is a partial list of some of the many 2D artists whose work has been translated into statues and busts by Joy and Tom Studios:

* Alex Ross	* Michael Turner
* Frank Frazetta	* George Pérez
* Matt Wagner	* Frank Cho
* Joseph Michael Linsner	* John Cassaday
* J. Scott Campbell	* Hal Foster
* John Romita, Sr.	* John Romita, Jr.
* Larry Elmore	* J. Allen St. John
* William Stout	* Gil Elvgren
* John Byrne

== Likeness Sculpting ==
Much of the sculpting done by Joy and Tom Studios that is not based on comic book properties involves sculpting likenesses of notable actors, musicians, and public figures. The company has sculpted approximately 1,000 different portraits of famous individuals including more than 300 different likenesses that have appeared on the stop-motion animated program Robot Chicken.

Of the many likenesses sculpted by Joy and Tom Studios, some of the notable public figures their work has been based on are listed below:

* George W. Bush	* Nicolas Cage	* Ray Charles
* Chevy Chase	* George Clooney	* Stephen Colbert
* Gary Coleman	* Sean Connery	* Daniel Craig
* Tom Cruise	* Matt Damon	* Robert Downey Jr.
* Clint Eastwood	* Harrison Ford	* Mel Gibson
* Seth Green	* Mark Hamill	* Anthony Hopkins
* Samuel L. Jackson	* Elton John	* Boris Karloff
* George Lucas	* Marilyn Monroe	* Eddie Murphy
* Bill Murray	* Leonard Nimoy	* Bill O' Reilly
* Bettie Page	* Sean Penn	* Brad Pitt
* Elvis Presley	* Vincent Price	* Prince
* Christopher Reeve	* William Shatner	* Kevin Spacey
* Britney Spears	* Sylvester Stallone	* Patrick Stewart
* Ben Stiller	* Mr. T	* John Travolta
* Vince Vaughn	* Adam West	* Owen Wilson

== Lifesize Sculpture ==
In addition to collectibles, Joy and Tom Studios has also done sculpting work on many life-size statues. From 1995-96 Joy and Tom worked full-time at Walt Disney World, designing and sculpting various life-size statues and props of Disney characters for display in the theme parks and stores, including a life-size Goofy statue sitting on a bench on permanent display just inside the front gate of the Magic Kingdom. Following their tenure at Disney, Joy and Tom continued to work for Disney on a freelance basis through their company.

In addition to their projects for Disney, other notable life-sized projects include Droid Starfighters from the Star Wars films that were displayed in F.A.O. Schwartz in New York City, a replica of the Batboat from the film Batman Forever used in a water-based stunt show at Six Flags over Texas, and the Emperor's throne for the set of the Mortal Kombat TV series.

== Awards and recognition ==
The sculpted works of Joy and Tom Studios have been honored by inclusion in the Spectrum Annual publication and the company has been recognized multiple times for their work by Wizard Magazine and ToyFare Magazine on various "Top 5 Statue and Busts" lists including the "Statue of the Year" award from ToyFare in 2005 for their Ultimate Spider-Man vs. Dr. Octopus for Dynamic Forces.
