= Asian fashion doll =

Toy market segment

- Type: Fashion dolls
- Country: Asia

Asian fashion dolls are fashion dolls that are made by Asian manufacturers or primarily targeted to an Asian market. Some have received international attention, such as with Momoko Doll, and in 2005 the first annual Dollstyle convention was held in Tokyo.

Many of these dolls have anime style features. Clothing lines may include Asian themes and in some cases Asian names (such as "Momoko" or "Taeyang"). Some Asian fashion dolls are dominated by Western dress, such as with Momoko Doll's lineup, Pullip's wardrobe, or the extensive Jenny fashions.

== Notable brands ==
- Pureneemo dolls by Azone (ja:アゾンインターナショナル)
- Blythe by Takara, formerly by Kenner
- Dollfie, Super Dollfie, and Dollfie Dream by Volks
- Jenny by Takara
- Kurhn doll (Chinese) by Foshan Kurhn Toys
- Licca-chan by Takara
- Momoko Doll by Petworks and Sekiguchi
- Obitsu by Obitsu (ja:オビツボディ)
- Pullip from Cheonsang Cheonha of South Korea. Manufactured by Groove, formerly by JUN Planning
- Sonokong dolls by Sonokong
- Smart Doll by Danny Choo
- YounJi by DollsKorea
- Mimi by MimiWorld

== See also ==
- Ball-jointed doll
