= Scheugenpflug =

Mechanical engineering manufacturer

Scheugenpflug (Atlas Copco EPS GmbH)
- Type: Aktiengesellschaft
- Industry: Mechanical engineering
- Founded: 1990
- Founder: Erich Scheugenpflug
- Headquarters: Neustadt an der Donau, Germany
- Area served: global
- Products: Resin dispensing systems
- Number of employees: 470 (2017)
- Website: www.scheugenpflug.de

Scheugenpflug is a manufacturer of adhesive bonding, dispensing, and potting systems for synthetic resins or thermally conductive pastes. Target industries include the automotive and electronics industry, telecommunications engineering, medical technology, and the chemical industry.

== Development ==
It was founded in 1990 by Erich Scheugenpflug, who gained his first experience in resin casting as an employee of Siemens AG in Munich. Over the years, the enterprise accomplished a leading role in the market for resin dispensing systems by gaining special know-how, demonstrated by numerous patents.

Over the years, it became evident that manufacturing steps before and after the casting had to be integrated into the design of resin casting systems to optimize the whole process. This caused the addition of automation to the range of products.

Because the company is active not only in the highly industrialized countries of Europe and USA, but also in emerging markets like India or Mexico, it was necessary to adapt the degree of automation of the delivered systems and machines to the level of wages and the skills of the employees. This resulted in the creation of preconfigured modular compounds that can be put together quickly to form individually designed systems.

In 2017, Scheugenpflug operated four subsidiaries in China, USA and Mexico and had sales partners in many parts of the world. The company employed more than 470 people worldwide, of which about 370 worked in the German headquarters.

Since 2020, Scheugenpflug belongs to the Atlas Copco enterprise, Sweden. In September 2020, the legal form of the Scheugenpflug AG was changed into a GmbH.

With the renaming to Atlas Copco EPS GmbH in 2024, the integration into the Atlas Copco Group has been completed. As the experts for automated electronics dispensing, the Scheugenpflug product line will now provide more comprehensive global support in all matters related to dispensing technology.

== Products ==
Scheugenpflug mainly produces piston dispensing systems. The product portfolio features various dispensers and dispensing cells for both atmospheric dispensing and vacuum potting.

The company also manufactures a variety of material preparation and feeding systems for liquid and pasty materials, even for such containing highly abrasive fillers. These systems are designed for container sizes ranging from standard cartridges to barrels. A patented vacuum follower plate was designed to facilitate the material feed from pails while reducing material waste.

In the area of process automation, Scheugenpflug provides all systems along the whole production chain, ranging from pretreatment, to dispensing and potting units to aftertreatment, including control and handling systems for the parts to be potted.
