= Hans Völk Dolls =

Hans Völk Dolls is a German doll manufacturing company owned by Engel-Puppen. Founded by puppeteer Hans Völk in 1922, the company have for more than 80 years produced its classical dolls in various materials.

== Background ==
In 1922 Hans purchased the old terracotta factory in Mönchröden, Germany. On 8 December that year he founded a company which specialized in punching and stamping paperboard together with his wife, Martha. During this period of time Hans manufactured puppets of papier-mâché.

Hans and Martha had a daughter, Lotte, on 6 August 1923, who would later run the company in future generations together with her husband, Otto Buchner. Additional doll models were created under her artistic influence. It was during the end of the 1950s that Lotte led the company into plastic manufacturing, the old puppets were redesigned in hard plastic in a blow-moulding process. The Völk factory was also installed with a rotational moulding technique, something that made the company a modern polymer processor.

Lotte and her mother, Martha ran the company after Hans death 1961, up to the passing of Martha in 1969. Lotte's husband, Otto, was mainly involved in technical issues in the manufacturing during this period. As Lotte died on 5 August 1989, and Otto on 29 June 1995, the ownership was left to their daughter, Barbara Buchner. It was Barbara who in 1997 gave up the polymer processing and instead focused on producing and selling classical Völk dolls, as well as nostalgic collector sets.

== Affiliation ==
In May 2002 Barbara decided that the doll department were to be continued by the doll-manufacturing company Engel-Puppen. The company introduced Völk dolls made in classical procedures under the Hans Völk trademark.

== See also ==
- Tonner Doll Company
