= Tyler Wentworth =

Fashion doll

Tyler Wentworth doll from the 2009 10th Anniversary collection

Tyler Wentworth was a 16" fashion doll created by Robert Tonner produced by the Tonner Doll Company, Inc. for adult collectors. Tyler Wentworth dolls were constructed of vinyl and hard plastic and had rooted hair or wigs. The Tonner Doll Company produced an extensive selection of ensembles and boutique pieces for the Tyler Wentworth doll made from the finest silks, French lace, chiffon, wool and scale knits. The Tonner Doll Company strongly encouraged adult collectors to play with their dolls.

The first Tyler Wentworth collection debuted at American International Toy Fair in 1999. Subsequent collections debuted each year at Toy Fair from 1999 until the company closed in 2018. Beginning in 2002, Tonner Doll Company released "Mid-Year" or "Fall / Holiday" collections during the Summer.

Tyler Wentworth had an elaborate backstory and several friends that have been produced as dolls for the collection.
