= Dollfie =

Toy doll brand

A customized Dollfie doll

Dollfie (ドルフィー, Dorufī) is a brand of vinyl doll created by the Japanese company Volks in 1997. It is a highly pose-able hybrid of fashion doll and action figure. A Dollfie doll is about the size of a Barbie doll, 1/6 or playscale, though there are variants in different heights ranging from 23–29 cm (9–11.5 in). Dollfie dolls generally come blank, with unpainted heads intended for the user to customize themselves. Dollfie dolls feature a larger range of motion and more points of articulation than a typical Western fashion doll, due to their target audience of adult collectors rather than children.

Sometimes included with Dollfie dolls were customization tools such as pre-rooted hair and stick-on eye decals. Later, complete dolls were released. There are various body types, male and female, with several forms and skin tones for both as well as a line of child-sized dolls. The company also produces tools and materials to customize and maintain dolls.

== Dollfie Dream ==
Dollfie Dream is a line of 60 centimetre soft-bodied vinyl dolls produced by Volks, similar to the smaller Dollfie dolls. Models released include both Volks original characters and licensed characters from popular media. A wide variety of parts are also available for purchase directly from Volks, up to and including pre-assembled bodies and heads. Seven different Dollfie Dream body types have been released:

The original Dollfie Dream body, referred to as simply Dollfie Dream, is a stylized adult female body. The body has gone through three revisions since its first release. The first Dollfie Dream Body which was called DD Basic body was strung with elastic string. The body pieces were 'hard soft vinyl' with the hands and bust being 'flexible soft vinyl'. The second and third versions, as well as all subsequent models released, are soft vinyl dolls with a hard plastic internal skeleton that enables articulation.

Mini Dollfie Dream is a short, childlike model that stands at about 43 centimetres, similar in concept to Mini Super Dollfie.

Dollfie Dream Pretty more mature in proportion than the Mini Dollfie Dream body, but less so than the Dollfie Dream or Dollfie Dream Sister. Its proportions are intended to be similar to that of a pre-teen or young teen girl.

Dollfie Dream Sister features a slightly smaller, shorter, and less mature frame than the Dollfie Dream.

Dollfie Dream Dynamite features a more curvy build than the Dollfie Dream, with wider hips and a larger bust.

Chimikko Dollfie Dream is the most recently released Dollfie Dream model, smaller than even Mini, it is made to look like a child of around six years old. Thus far only two limited models have been released.

In 2016, Volks released their first two male Dollfie Dream dolls, modeled after the Vocaloid mascot Len Kagamine and the character Kirito from Sword Art Online. The body type shared by all male Dollfie Dream dolls is referred to by Volks as the Dollfie Dream Boy body. This model has yet to see a wide release, and is only available as limited character models or at Volks's Doll Point stores.

== See also ==
- Asian fashion doll
