= Super Dollfie =

Japanese brand of ball-jointed doll

スーパードルフィー

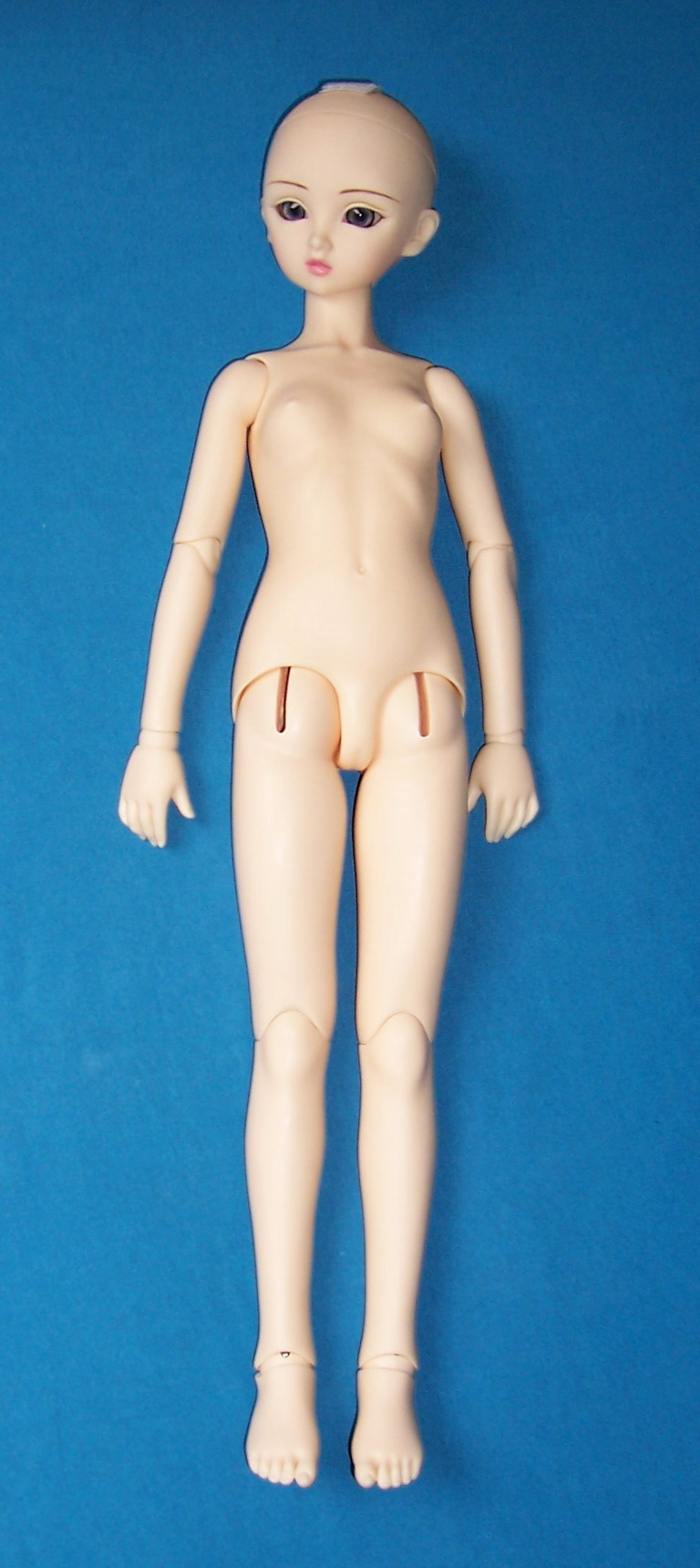

Super Dollfie (スーパードルフィー, Sūpā Dorufī), often abbreviated SD, is a brand of ball-jointed doll, or BJD, made by the Japanese company Volks. They are made to be easy to customize and are primarily marketed to adult doll collectors and customizers. They are cast in polyurethane resin, a porcelain-like, hard, dense plastic. The most common standard models are about 60 cm, or 24 inches, tall, taller and heavier than most comparable Western dolls. They are designed in a style which is both realistic and influenced by anime, and most models are anatomically correct. The various body parts have ball joints for articulation, and are strung together with a thick elastic cord.

The term "dollfie" is a portmanteau formed from the words "doll" and "figure". The original Dollfie dolls are Barbie sized vinyl figures, and the term "Super Dollfie" was introduced to distinguish the larger resin dolls. Super Dollfie, or even just Dollfie, are sometimes used as generic terms to refer to BJDs made by other companies. However, both Super Dollfie and Dollfie are registered trademarks.

== Overview ==
Super Dollfie dolls are made to be easy to customize. The hair is a wig that can easily be changed. The head can be opened to change the eyes and adjust the stringing. The face paint can be removed and the head repainted. Optional hands and feet are available, and heads and other body parts are removable and interchangeable. The resin parts themselves can be carved or sanded to reshape them.

Super Dollfie are not widely distributed, and, with a few exceptions, new dolls are only available directly through Volks own events or stores, either online, or through their brick and mortar stores called Tenshi no Sumika (angel's nest), located throughout Japan, in South Korea and until March 2014 in Los Angeles, California.

Super Dollfie are collectible, customizable dolls marketed to adults. They vary in price from about 36,000 yen (about US $400) for the smallest, unassembled standard models, up to about 150,000 yen (about US $2,000) for the most exclusive larger limited dolls that come with outfits and accessories.

On the secondary market, limited and customized Super Dollfie often fetch a higher price than the original. There is a second hand market online, where dolls are bought and sold on auction sites, as well as forums.

New models are regularly released at Dolls Party, or Dolpa, (ja:ドールズパーティー) promotional convention-like events organized by Volks several times a year in locations around Japan. Here fans can buy and sell limited and customized dolls, accessories and clothes. Dolpas have grown in scale over the years and the Dolls Party held at Tokyo Big Sight regularly has 15,000 attendees.

Tenshi no Sato (angel's home) in Kyoto is Volks headquarters and Super Dollfie museum. Here exclusive doll models are sold, and events are held where special limited editions are released. Doll repair services are also available and classes are held teaching various customization methods. Tenshi no Sato is surrounded by a traditional Japanese garden where visitors can photograph their dolls. To gain entrance visitors have to book reservations in advance.

Following the introduction of Super Dollfies an increasing number of Asian ball-jointed doll companies have been established, most of them based in South Korea.

== History ==
In the late 1990s Volks produced a line of 1:6 scale articulated vinyl figures for hobbyist customers to finish to their own taste. Volks named these figures Dollfie, a portmanteau of doll and figure.

The first Super Dollfie was designed in 1999 by the sculptor Akihiro Enku. Enku sculpted a one-off doll for his wife, 57 cm tall, in what would become the Super Dollfie size and style. An executive director at Volks noticed the doll and wondered if they would be made in larger numbers.

The first Super Dollfie release was four different models, Kira, Nana, Sara and Megu, which all shared the same head mold, the standard SD Four Sisters head.

At this time Volks was a producer of resin figure kits, and the early Super Dollfie were made and sold similarly to resin kits, in very small quantities (almost build to order), and in parts, for the customer to assemble. Volks has stated that they were trying to create a female market for resin kits, which were male dominated up to that point.

The first generation SD bodies were highly detailed, but had some difficulty remaining standing, and their ball joints were very prominent.

All Super Dollfie dolls were female, until 2001 when the first boy doll, Licht, was released. The first release was a limited run of only 50 dolls, but sales were so successful that the doll was rereleased two times, and many other male dolls followed.

In 2003, Volks released a new 'skin type' (resin mixture) of the dolls called "Pure Skin". Pure skin has a less plastic and more skin-like, translucent look and feel. The Super Dollfie body was improved with better poseability and less conspicuous ball joints. During the change, Volks gradually phased out production of "old skin" dolls in favor of pure skin.

Old skin body parts were available separately, so buyers could easily get pieces and assemble their own custom doll. After the change to pure skin, only certain hands and feet are available to buy as optional parts, and only a few pure skin head molds and body types are readily available as completed standard models. The majority of Super Dollfie models are now only available as limited editions, already assembled, painted, and fully clothed.

Following the 2003 changes of the dolls, Volks expanded their business internationally. The same year they held the first Dolpa in South Korea, and also opened the first Korean store. In 2004 the Super Dollfie museum Tenshi no Sato was opened in Kyoto. In November 2005 Volks USA opened their first American Tenshi no Sumika store in Los Angeles, California, and they have been holding Dolpa events in New York City every summer since 2006.

In 2008 Japan Today reported that Volks annual sales were $50 million and that they have about 30 shops worldwide.

== Culture ==
There is a sizeable community dedicated to Super Dollfie and other ball-jointed dolls. The largest English BJD forum has over 30,000 members as of March 2011. Doll owners customize their dolls and share photos and photo stories online. The dolls are usually named by their owner, and sometimes assigned individual characteristics and personality traits. In the West, enthusiasts organize offline doll meetups and conventions, which include other BJDs along with Super Dollfie. In Japan, Volks hold Dolpa conventions and Tenshi no Sumika store meetups. These are exclusively Super Dollfie events, and other BJD brands are not allowed.

Super Dollfie is associated with the Gothic Lolita and Lolita fashion subcultures in Japan, as well as the Cosplay subculture, with some dressing their Super Dollfie up as famous characters. Volks have a history of collaborating with Lolita fashion designers going back to 2002, when they released limited edition Super Dollfie with clothes designed by Baby, The Stars Shine Bright, Black Peace Now and Atelier-Pierrot.

The character Momoko from the Lolita fashion-themed movie Kamikaze Girls was released as a limited Super Dollfie, wearing a Baby, The Stars Shine Bright outfit, coinciding with the release of the movie in Japan in 2004. Baby, The Stars Shine Bright have created several other Super Dollfie outfits as well. Some sold separately, some with limited edition dolls. They have also made matching human and doll sized outfits, like the outfits worn by the limited edition Toppi and Luna released in early 2007.

The Gothic Lolita fashion designer H. Naoto created an exclusive outfit for a limited Super Dollfie in 2006, and have since created several other Super Dollfie outfits.

Super Dollfie are influenced by the anime style, but they also have some more direct ties with anime and manga. In 2003, the android character Chi from the manga and anime Chobits, as well as Yumi and Sachiko from Maria-sama ga Miteru were produced as limited edition Super Dollfie. The main characters in the manga and anime Rozen Maiden are all BJD-like "living dolls", and five of them were released as limited Super Dollfie dolls in 2005 and 2007.

Super Dollfie have also been featured in various work. A fashion shoot with Super Dollfie was featured in the November 2007 issue of Vogue Nippon. The virtual band Mistula is composed of customized ball-jointed dolls, several of which are Super Dollfie. The 2006 Kawaii episode of the British TV series Japanorama featured a segment on Super Dollfie.

== Super Dollfie models ==
Super Dollfie, or SD, was the first model, introduced in 1999. The current pure skin models are about 55 cm (22 inches) tall, while the original version was slightly taller at 57 cm (23 inches). Among fans they are sometimes referred to as Super Dollfie 10 or SD10 to specifically refer to the size versus the whole line of dolls.

Super Dollfie 13, or SD13, are more mature and slightly taller than the plain Super Dollfie, SD13 boys are 60 cm (24 inches), and girls 57 cm. When they were released in December 2001 they were an improvement on the original SD body, with less prominent ball joints.

Mini Super Dollfie, or MSD, are more childlike and shorter, about 42 cm (17 inches) tall. They were introduced in September 2001.

The standard names SD, SD13 and MSD, or just "mini", are sometimes used to describe the size of BJDs from other companies as well, compare with Ball-jointed doll sizes and types.

Yo-SD, from the Japanese infant (幼, yō), are only available as limited editions, but they have been released several times. Younger looking than MSD, they are 26.5 cm tall, and were first released in 2004.

DearSD, or Dear Super Dollfie, is the latest available Super Dollfie model. It was first released in 2015, in commemoration of the 16th anniversary of Super Dollfie. The DearSD is very similar in height to the MSD, standing at 43 cm tall. However, the proportions of a DearSD are more childlike since the DearSD is meant to depict a toddler. The DearSD body is asexual, allowing owners of this doll to customize it into a boy or a girl. The DearSD is currently a limited model, made available for sale in small batches to collectors in Japan. It will be sold again in limited runs, but a date for the next sale has yet to be announced.

In addition to these models, there are also the limited edition SD16 and SD17, which are more mature than SD13 and about 65 cm (25.6 inches) tall, and SDCute, which are about as tall as MSD, but more mature. The regular SD versions are anatomically correct, but there are also limited genderless Tenshi, or angel, editions. Sei-Tenshi and Rei-Tenshi are smaller than Yo-SD and not for sale, but only given out at promotional events.

Super Dollfie buyers can also create a customized doll with the Full Choice System, or FCS. Through FCS, the buyer selects from various options including body type, head mold, eye color, wig style, and cosmetics style, and the doll is then assembled by Volks. Different FCS head molds are distinguished by numbers, not names like the pre-assembled models, with for example F-16 being a popular mold. FCS is not available online, but only through Volks physical Tenshi no Sumika stores or through Tenshi no Sato, where the FCS service has additional options.

== See also ==
- Ball-jointed doll
- Dollfie

== Bibliography ==
- スーパードルフィー パーフェクトカタログ [Super Dollfie Catalog]. Japan: Asahi Sonorama. 2003. ISBN 4-257-03686-9.
- スーパードルフィー パーフェクトカタログ (2) [Super Dollfie Catalog 2]. Japan: Asahi Sonorama. 2005. ISBN 4-257-03709-1.
- スーパードルフィーパーフェクトカタログ 3 [Super Dollfie Catalog 3]. Japan: Asahi Sonorama. 2007. ISBN 978-4-257-03739-2.
