= Ball-jointed doll =

Type of articulated doll most commonly purchased by adult collectors

Super Dollfie, a modern Japanese ball-jointed doll (BJD) described by Time as having "exaggerated features inspired by Japanese animation"

A ball-jointed doll is any doll that is articulated with ball and socket joints. In contemporary usage when referring to modern dolls, and particularly when using the acronyms BJD or ABJD, it usually refers to modern Asian ball-jointed dolls. These are cast in polyurethane synthetic resin, a hard, dense plastic, and the parts strung together with a thick elastic. They are predominantly produced in Japan, South Korea and China. The BJD style has been described as both realistic and influenced by anime. They commonly range in size from about 60 centimetres (24 in) for the larger dolls, 40 cm (15.5 in) for the mini dolls, and down to 10 cm (4 in) for the very smallest BJDs. BJDs are primarily intended for adult collectors and customizers. They are made to be easy to customize, by painting, changing the eyes and wig, and so forth.

The modern BJD market began with the Volks line of Super Dollfie in 1999. Super Dollfie and Dollfie are registered trademarks but are sometimes erroneously used as generic blanket terms to refer to all Asian BJDs regardless of manufacturer.

== History ==
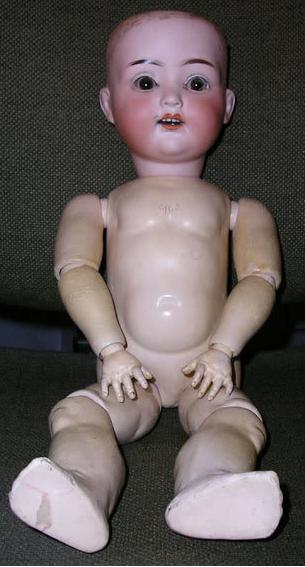
Bisque-headed German doll with ball-jointed composition body, c. 1920

Articulated dolls go back to at least 200 BCE, with articulated clay and wooden dolls of ancient Greece and Rome. The modern era of ball-jointed doll history began in Western Europe in the late 19th century. From the late 19th century through the early 20th century, French and German manufacturers made bisque dolls with strung bodies articulated with ball joints made of composition: a mix of pulp, sawdust, glue, and similar materials. These dolls could measure between 15 and 100 cm (6 and 39.5 in) and are now collectible antiques.

During the 1930s, the German artist Hans Bellmer created dolls with ball joints and used them in photography and other surrealistic artwork. Bellmer introduced the idea of artful doll photography, which continues today with Japanese doll artists, as well as BJD hobbyists.

Influenced by Bellmer and the rich Japanese doll tradition, Japanese artists began creating strung ball-jointed art dolls. These are commonly made entirely of bisque and are often very tall, sometimes as tall as 120 cm (47 in). These dolls are purely intended as art, and not for play or even the hobby level of collecting usually associated with dolls. They cost several thousand dollars, up to several hundred thousand dollars for older collectible dolls from famous artists. The art doll community is still active in Japan and artists regularly release artbooks with photographs of their dolls.

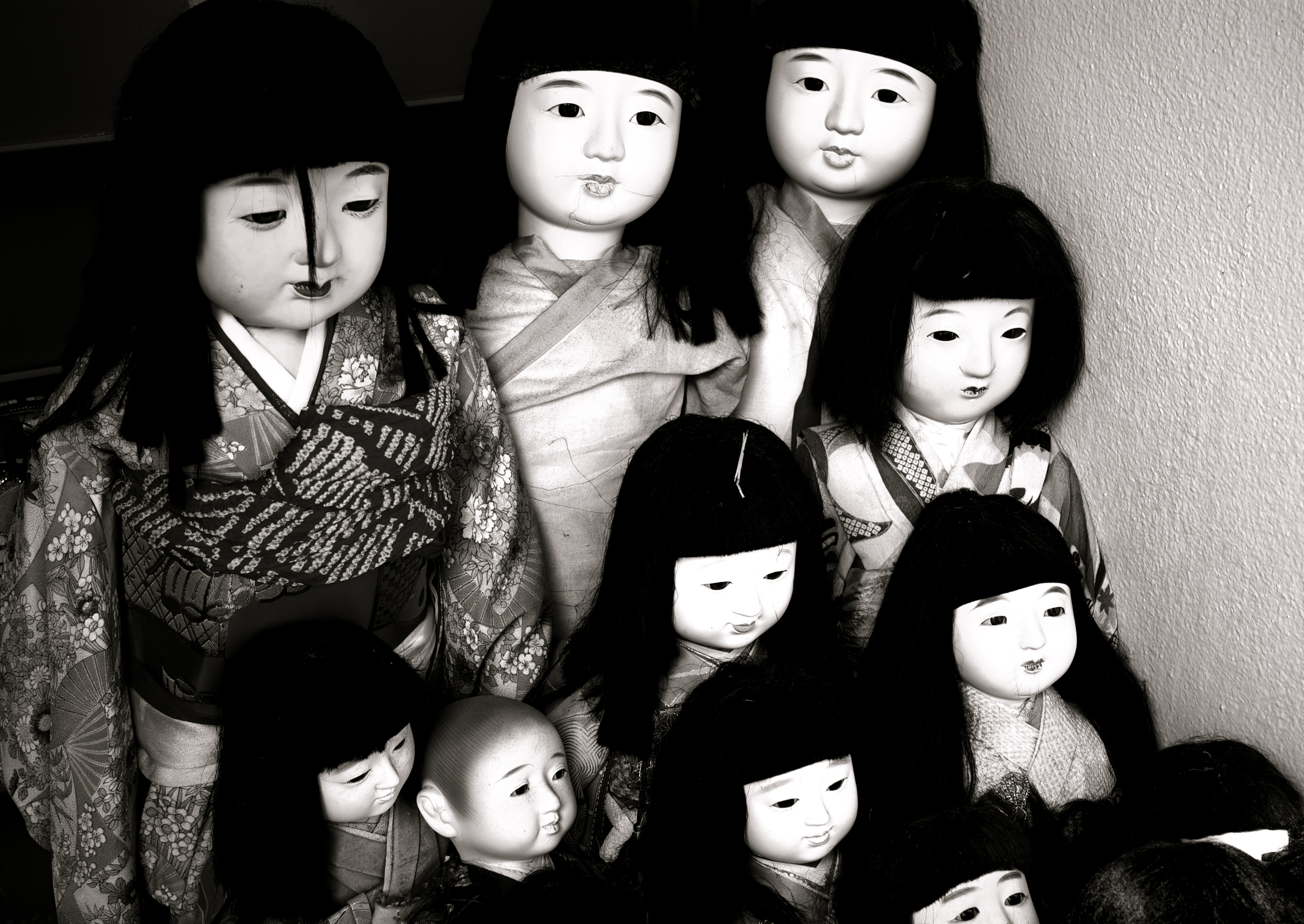
Asian ball-jointed dolls are influenced by Japanese traditional dolls, like Ichimatsu dolls (pictured).

The history of commercially produced Asian resin BJDs began in 1999 when the Japanese company Volks created the Super Dollfie line of dolls. The first Super Dollfie were 57 cm tall, strung with elastic, ball-jointed, and made of polyurethane resin; similar to garage kits, which were Volks main product at the time. Super Dollfie were made to be highly customizable and to find a female market for Volks products. See further: Super Dollfie History.

The earliest Asian BJDs were influenced by the anime aesthetic. The early, prominent BJD companies Volks, Cerberus Project with the Delf line, as well as the Japanese artist Gentaro Araki with the U-noa line, all have backgrounds in anime-style resin figure kits.

Around 2002–2003, South Korean companies started creating and producing BJDs. Customhouse and Cerberus Project were among the first Korean BJDs companies, and since then the Korean market has expanded with many more.

Unlike the West and Japan, Hong Kong previously did not have doll culture. In 2003, BJD collector Pasu Lau first introduced BJDs to Hong Kong. Since then, they have been featured in local news reports, including Sing Tao Daily, Asia Television, and Phoenix Hong Kong Channel. Initially, BJDs accounted for only 5% of the doll market in Hong Kong, but by 2024, they had gained prominence through exhibitions and become a recognized art form in the city.

The earliest Chinese produced BJDs were knockoffs. Some were direct recasts, while others were slight modifications of Super Dollfie or Korean BJDs. These knockoffs were made of plaster, low quality resin or polystone—a mix of resin and a filler material like sand. They were low in price, but not very durable. The first Chinese company to release their own original BJD sculpts in high quality polyurethane resin was Dollzone. Their dolls hit the market in 2006. Since then, several other Chinese companies followed suit, putting their own BJD creations on the international market.

The first American company to produce a BJD with more of an American aesthetic influence was Goodreau Doll in 2007.

== Modern Asian BJDs ==
Modern Asian BJDs are intended for adult collectors and customizers and range in price from US$100 to over US$1000. The more costly BJDs have body elements which are cast in polyurethane resin and held together by thick elastic cords, making them fully articulated and highly poseable.

BJDs tend to follow a distinctly Asian view in their aesthetics, but the designs are diverse and range from highly anime-inspired to hyper-realistic. LA Weekly said Asian BJDs are "often strangely human looking" while NPR described them as "eerily lifelike." Most are anatomically correct and have proportionally large heads, big eyes and comparatively large feet, contrasted with fashion dolls like Barbie, and are capable of standing on their own, without a stand or other support.

=== Customization ===
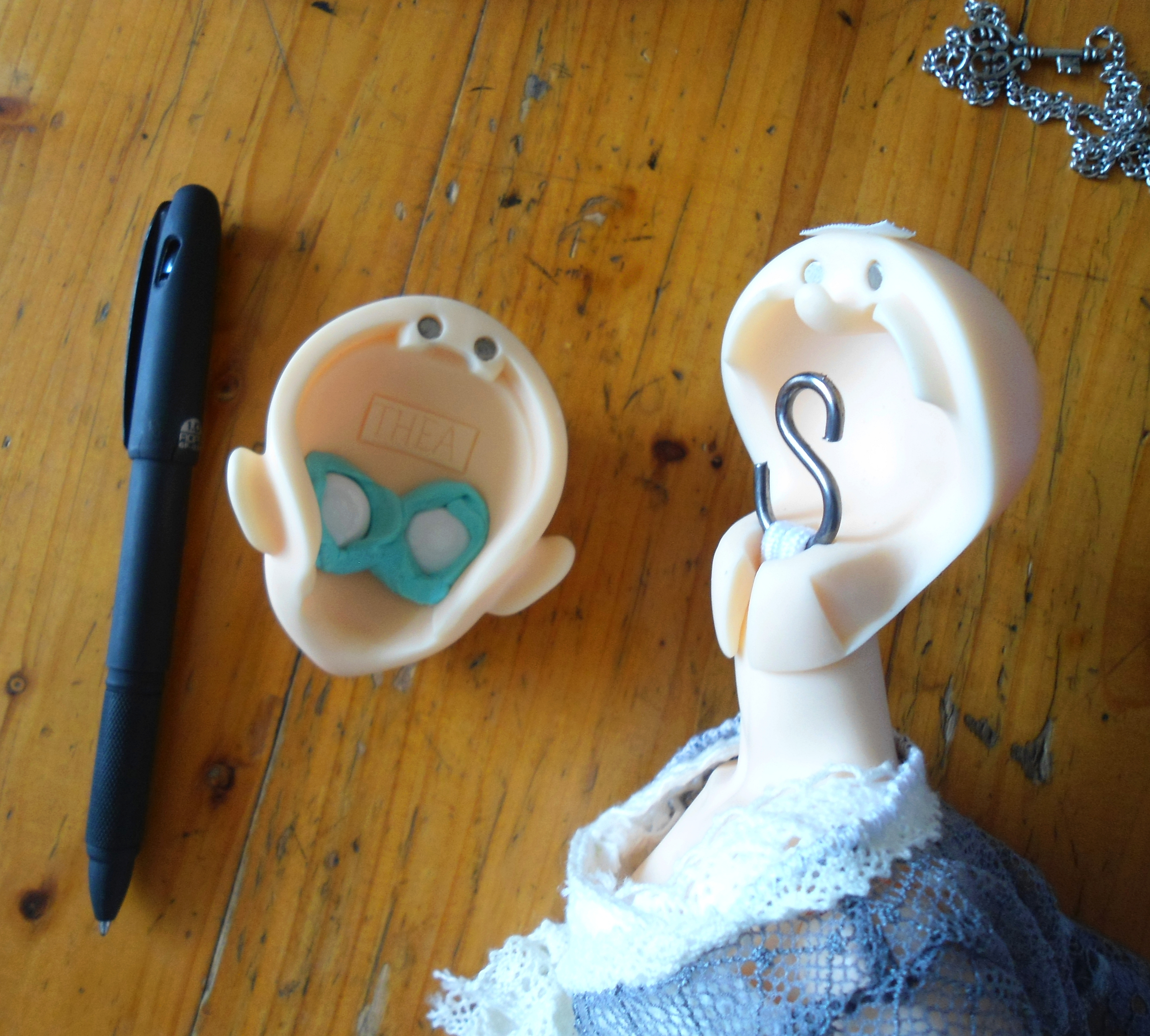
Female doll with face removed showing replaceable eyes. Note the velcro tab on the top of the head for wig attachment.

BJDs are readily customizable. Wigs and eyes are easy to remove and replace, as well as heads, hands, and feet. A doll may even be a hybrid of parts from different companies. Some BJD owners or customizers even re-shape existing parts by sanding them or applying epoxy putty to them.

BJD face paint is referred to as a face-up to indicate that it is not just make-up, but all facial features that are painted on and customized. This includes the eyebrows, lips and blushing to enhance features. Face-ups and body blushing are done with watercolor pencils, acrylic paint—applied with a regular brush or an airbrush—or soft pastels, and coated with a sprayed-on layer of clear matte sealant for protection. BJD face-ups, even from large companies, are always painted by hand, and it takes considerable skill to execute detailed, professional face-ups. The polyurethane resin material of which the higher-end, hand-cast BJDs are usually made is easier to paint than the softer and more slick vinyl often used for other dolls, which may require a base sealant to make the paint adhere properly.

=== Culture ===
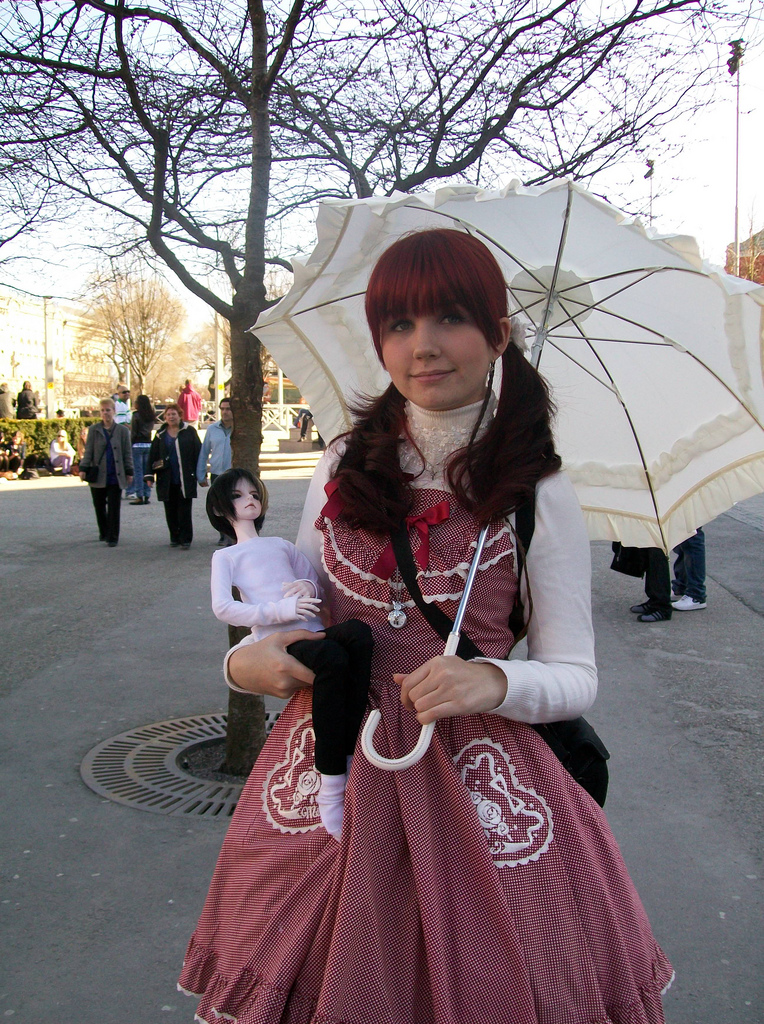
A BJD owner wearing Lolita fashion

There is a sizeable international community dedicated to BJDs. The largest English language BJD internet community, Den of Angels, has over 43,000 members as of February 2016. Enthusiasts have also held offline BJD meetups and organized conventions, like Dollectable in San Francisco, US. In Japan, Dolls Party conventions are organized by Volks, and some enthusiasts meet and take pictures of their dolls at doll-friendly maid cafés.

BJDs owners usually customize the look of their dolls, and they are often named, and sometimes assigned individual characteristics and personality traits. The dolls are often used as subjects of artistic work, such as photography or drawing, which is shared on the internet. Some use their dolls and characters for roleplaying. A small minority makes further emotional investment, going so far as to talk to their dolls as if they were alive.

Some BJDs are collectible; limited editions and skillfully customized dolls can fetch prices much higher than the original in the second hand market, sometimes as much as US $5000. However, the customization and personalization aspects are usually more emphasized in the BJD world. Even collectible limited-edition BJDs are played with and used as props in photoshoots, and even dolls that are no longer in mint condition can command high prices in the second hand market.

Many BJD owners have other interests such as anime, Lolita fashion and cosplay, and some dress their dolls in related styles. BJDs can often be seen dressed in contemporary and casual youth fashions like punk or goth. Other dolls may display fantasy elements like elf ears, vampire fangs, different types of wings, horns, hooves, and cyborg parts.

Doll manufacturers sometimes base BJDs on characters from anime, manga, other works of fiction, or even historical figures. Some BJD owners similarly customize their dolls to create one-off representations of existing characters or celebrities.

Asian BJDs have been featured in movies and other works. The Korean horror movie Doll Master from 2004 and the Taiwanese drama film Spider Lilies from 2007 feature BJDs. The virtual band Mistula is composed of customized BJDs, Super Dollfie and Delf dolls. The main characters in the manga and anime Rozen Maiden are ball-jointed living dolls. The horror novel, manga and anime Another also features BJDs. BJDs are also an important motif in the movie Ghost in the Shell: Innocence where many dolls have "spirits" of some sort, but at the same time are not quite human, with designs based on the art of Hans Bellmer.

=== Sizes and types ===
The earliest BJDs were all around 60 centimetres (24 in) tall, but as the market expanded they have been produced in many different types and sizes. There are roughly three main size categories for BJDs: full size, mini and tiny. Compare with Super Dollfie models.

Large full size dolls, sometimes referred to as SD size from the Super Dollfie size range, are around 60 centimetres (24 inches). Roughly 1/3 scale, they usually represent fully grown teenagers or adult body types. There is also a range of even larger full size BJD, from about 70–90 cm (27.5–35.5 in) tall.

Mini size dolls, sometimes referred to as MDD from Mini Dollfie Dream or MSD from the Mini Super Dollfie size range, are about 40 cm (15.5 in) tall. There are two major categories of minis: those that are roughly in the same scale as the 1/3 full-size dolls and meant to look like children, and mature or slim minis which are meant to represent fully grown adults that are in 1/4 scale.

Tiny BJDs are under 30 cm (12 in) tall. They are available in many different types and scales. Some tiny BJD are made to look like toddlers or babies next to full size dolls, these are about 25 cm (10 in) tall and are sometimes referred to as Yo-SD size after the Super Dollfie size range. Even smaller childlike dolls, tiny tinies, are usually not made to be in scale with any larger BJDs. A few tiny BJDs have mature bodies and are in the same 1/6 scale as fashion dolls like Barbie, about 21–30 cm (8.5–12 in) tall. Humanoid anthro animal BJDs are usually in the tiny size scale.

=== Production ===
Ball-jointed doll prototypes can be produced in one of two ways. They can be initially modeled in clay, most commonly polymer clay, by hand or, alternatively, they can be digitally designed using digital sculpting tools such as ZBrush, and 3D printed. The hardened clay or 3D printed body parts are used to form molds for multiple parts to be cast in synthetic polyurethane resin. Cured resin has a hard, smooth, porcelain-like feel, but is less brittle. Unlike porcelain however, polyurethane tends to turn yellow and decay over time depending on exposure to UV light and heat. The resin casting process allows for molds to be produced with a relatively low initial investment, compared to the injection molding commonly used for mass produced vinyl dolls. However, the materials are more expensive, and the process requires more manual labor, resulting in a higher cost per unit.

Most regular edition BJDs come assembled with an option for a "face-up", the facial blushing and painting, while full set BJDs, which are often limited, include clothes, face-up, and sometimes full body blushing. A few BJDs are sold as bare unassembled parts in a kit, similar to a garage kit.

=== Lines and companies ===
BJDs are produced by anything from single-person outfits on a hobby level, to incorporated multinationals. Hobby artists in Asia, particularly Japan, and the West, particularly USA and Australia, create and sell their own dolls. In Asia there is a wide variety of companies making BJDs, most based in South Korea. The BJD Orbyrarium book lists 49 different BJD companies and one fan-run BJD database includes 125 companies as of February 2009. A few of the most notable BJD lines and companies can be found below.

On occasion, unauthorized copies or recasts of original dolls are sold, predominantly in South-East Asia. Several Korean and Japanese BJD companies have posted notices warning against recast dolls. There is a strong resistance against these knockoff dolls within the BJD community.

==== Japan ====
Super Dollfie from Volks

Super Dollfie from Volks was the first line of modern Asian BJD. They set the range of sizes used by most companies. Volks have released a vast variety of different dolls, most of them limited editions, some in collaboration with fashion designers like Baby, The Stars Shine Bright and H. Naoto or anime series like Rozen Maiden. Volks has a number of stores in Japan and Korea, as well as one in Los Angeles. They also run the Super Dollfie museum, Tenshi-no-Sato in Kyoto, Japan. In 2004, Time magazine described Super Dollfie as having "trendily refined makeup" and "exaggerated features inspired by Japanese animation". Shojo Beat, in 2008, said they have "cool glassy expressions", "a distinct anime look" and that their styles "stay true to a Japanese aesthetic."

U-noa

The Japanese artist Gentaro Araki first started in BJDs in 2000 with the 60 cm Andolrea U-Noss line in collaboration with Volks. He later went on to create his own company called Alchemic Labo with a line of mature minis called the U-noa Quluts, and later continued to branch out to other sizes including the 35 cm Unoa Quluts Chibi and the 64 cm Unoa Zero/Unon.

==== Korea ====
Delf from Luts and Cerberus Project

The Delf dolls were one of the earliest lines from Korea, dating back to 2003. They are slightly taller and slimmer than Super Dollfie and there is a variety of doll types available, including dolls with elf ears and vampire teeth. Delf were originally designed by Japanese resin kit designers Cerberus Project and made and distributed by the Korean company Luts, who also own the rights to use the Delf name. These dolls are often referred to by the acronym CP, or as Luts dolls, after the distributor; dolls produced after 2007 are correctly known only as Luts dolls due to a split between Cerberus Project and Luts, who now trade separately. Minifee are mini-sized versions of the Delf dolls made by Cerberus Project, distributed by Korean company Fairyland. Old Delf line sculpted and manufactured by Cerberus Project was discontinued in November 15, 2011 on Luts website. New Delf line sculpted and manufactured by Luts was launched on December 2012 and this new Delf line has nothing to do with Cerberus Project.

Custom House

Custom House is one of the oldest Korean BJD companies. Their dolls were featured in the Korean horror movie Doll Master from 2004.

Doll in Mind

D.I.M (Doll in Mind) produced, among other dolls, the Minimee, completely customized heads created from customer photos or drawings. Some people commissioned heads from them in the likeness of celebrities, anime/video game characters, TV show personas, or even comic book characters.

Dollshe

Dollshe introduced a line of tall, slim, double jointed mature boy dolls in 2003. These are slightly larger full size BJD, about 68 cm tall. Their Bermann doll was strictly limited and is one of the most sought after collectible BJDs. Tensiya has since split with Dollshe.

Dream of Doll

D.O.D. (Dream of Doll) was one of the earliest Korean companies to make a large line of child like minis, D.O.C. (Dream of Children). They have since expanded and now make, among others, the D.O.T. (Dream of Teen) line, the D.O.B line (Dream of Baby), and D.O.I. (Dream of Idol) line.

Elfdoll

Elfdoll is a subsidiary of the Korean company Artmaze. Elfdoll are created by the sculptor Rainman and a team of artisans. In addition to a range of fullsize human dolls, Elfdoll have released many types of tiny anthro BJDs, beginning with Catsy. They had a showroom in Glendale, California, opened in August 2007 where they held parties and meetups for BJD enthusiasts. In 2007, LA Weekly described Elfdoll dolls as having "detailed, human-like features."

==== China ====
Dollzone

Dollzone was one of the first Chinese BJD doll brands, developed and manufactured by Shenzhen Red Society Toys Ltd. Dollzone make male and female dolls, 1/3 and 1/4 dolls, and BB dolls in 26 cm size.

Ringdoll

Ringdoll is a Chinese BJD company, known for its ‘Spirits between Fingers'. It collaborated with brand Clairol in 2014.

Angell Studio

Angell Studio was established in Hangzhou, China in 2005 as one of the earliest BJD creators in China. In 2013, the company collaborated with makers of Gujian Qitan (古剑奇谭), a popular Chinese MMOG to create ball jointed dolls for the game.

FaithZ

FaithZ is a Hong Kong based ball-jointed doll dealer shop, founded by Pasu. It has signed contracts with several BJD companies and sell their dolls. It also organises bjd exhibition called Dollvie.

Doll Leaves

Doll Leaves is a Shenzhen based Chinese ball jointed doll company introduced in April, 2010. The company produces both male and female dolls in sizes ranging from 12 cm to 70 cm in a variety of skin tones.

== Vinyl dolls ==
There are several types of larger 60 cm vinyl dolls in Japan. They are in the same scale as fullsize BJDs, with similar proportions. The two most common types are Dollfie Dream from Volks and Obitsu. The first Dollfie Dream body type was strung and had classic ball and socket joints, but the current body has an internal skeleton of hard plastic, as do the Obitsu dolls. The vinyl bodies can, sometimes with some modifications, be combined with a resin BJD head. Vinyl dolls usually have facial features that are more highly stylized after anime and less realistic than the typical resin BJDs.

== See also ==
- Asian fashion doll
- Super Dollfie
