= Potting (electronics) =

Encasing of electronics in solid resin

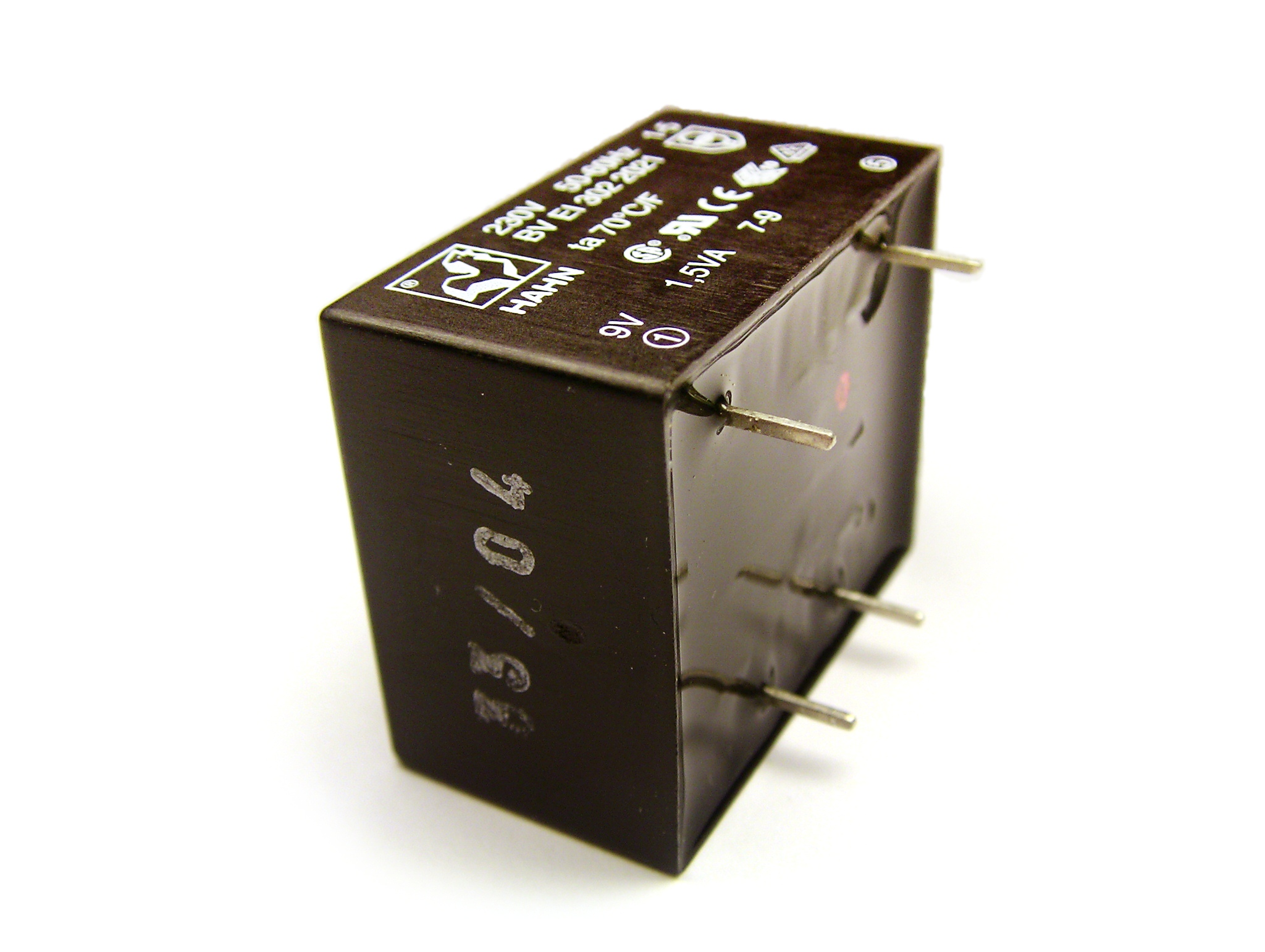
A small transformer potted in epoxy. The surface visible on the right is formed by the potting compound that has been poured into the plastic box.

In electronics, potting is the process of filling a complete electronic assembly with a solid or gelatinous compound. This is done to exclude water, moisture, or corrosive agents, to increase resistance to shocks and vibrations, or to prevent gaseous phenomena such as corona discharge in high-voltage assemblies. Potting has also been used to protect against reverse engineering or to protect parts of cryptography processing cards. When such materials are used only on single components instead of entire assemblies, the process is referred to as encapsulation.

Thermosetting plastics or silicone rubber gels are often used, though epoxy resins are also very common. When epoxy resins are used, low chloride grades are usually specified. Many sites recommend using a potting product to protect sensitive electronic components from impact, vibration, and loose wires.

In the potting process, an electronic assembly is placed inside a mold (the "pot") which is then filled with an insulating liquid compound that hardens, permanently protecting the assembly. The mold may be part of the finished article and may provide shielding or heat dissipating functions in addition to acting as a mold. When the mold is removed the potted assembly is described as cast.

As an alternative, many circuit board assembly houses coat assemblies with a layer of transparent conformal coating rather than potting. Conformal coating gives most of the benefits of potting, and is lighter and easier to inspect, test, and repair. Conformal coatings can be applied as liquid or condensed from a vapor phase.

When potting a circuit board that uses surface-mount technology, low glass transition temperature (T_{g}) potting compounds such as polyurethane or silicone may be used. High T_{g} potting compounds may break solder bonds through solder fatigue by hardening at a higher temperature because the coating then shrinks as a rigid solid over a larger part of the temperature range, thus developing greater force.

== See also ==
- Integrated circuit packaging
- Resin dispensing
