= Resin casting =

Method of plastic casting

Resin casting is a method of plastic casting where a mold is filled with a liquid synthetic resin, which then hardens. It is primarily used for small-scale production such as industrial prototypes and dentistry. It can be done by amateur hobbyists with little initial investment, and is used in the production of collectible toys, models and figures, as well as small-scale jewellery production.

The synthetic resin for such processes is a monomer for making a plastic thermosetting polymer. During the setting process, the liquid monomer polymerizes into the polymer, thereby hardening into a solid.

Single-monomer resins may be used in the process, which form homopolymers (polymers made from a single type of monomer). In such uses, the "curing agent" mixed with the resin contains what is loosely referred to as a "catalyst," but which is more technically an initial source of free radicals (such as MEKP) to act as an initiator in a free-radical chemical chain reaction polymerization. Alternately, resin casting may be accomplished with a resin plus a nearly equal amount of a "hardener" liquid (as in many epoxy resin or polyester resin systems), which functionally contains a second polymer, for use in forming a final product plastic which is a copolymer. Copolymers contain two different alternating chemical entities in the final polymer molecule.

== Process ==
Most commonly a thermosetting resin is used that polymerizes by mixing with a curing agent (polymerization catalyst) at room temperature and normal atmospheric pressure. The resins are named by analogy with plant resins, but are synthetic monomers for making polymer plastics. The so-called synthetic resins used include polystyrene resin, polyurethane resin, epoxy resin, unsaturated polyester resin, acrylic resin and silicone resin.

Epoxy resin has a lower viscosity than polyurethane resin; polyester resin also shrinks markedly while curing. Acrylic resin, in particular the methyl methacrylate type of synthetic resin, produces acrylic glass (also called PMMA, Lucite, Plexiglass), which is not a glass but a plastic polymer that is transparent, and very hard. It is suitable for embedding objects (such as, for example, acrylic trophies), for display purposes. Styrene is a similar liquid monomer at room temperature, which will also polymerize into clear glass-like polystyrene plastic, with addition of a suitable catalyst.

A flexible mold can be made of latex rubber, room temperature vulcanized silicone rubber, of which there are two types: Tin catalysed (sometimes called condensation cured due to the alcohols weeping out as a by product of the reaction) or Platinum (or addition cured, thus no byproduct) catalysed. Other similar materials can be used at relatively low cost, but can only be used for a limited number of castings.

The simplest method is gravity casting where the resin is poured into the mold and pulled down into all the parts by gravity. When the two part resin is mixed air bubbles tend to be introduced into the liquid which can be removed in a vacuum chamber. The casting can also be done in a vacuum chamber (when using open molds) to either extract these bubbles, or in a pressure pot, to reduce their size to the point where they aren't visible. Specialist equipment can enable closed molds to be filled whilst under vacuum, a process known as resin vacuum casting, where air and gas bubbles are completely removed from the cast part. Pressure and/or centrifugal force can be used to help push the liquid resin into all details of the mold. The mold can also be vibrated to expel bubbles.

Each unit requires some amount of hands-on labor, making the final cost per unit produced fairly high. This is in contrast to injection molding where the initial cost of creating the metal mold is higher, but the mold can be used to produce a much higher number of units, resulting in a lower cost per unit.

== Collectibles and models ==
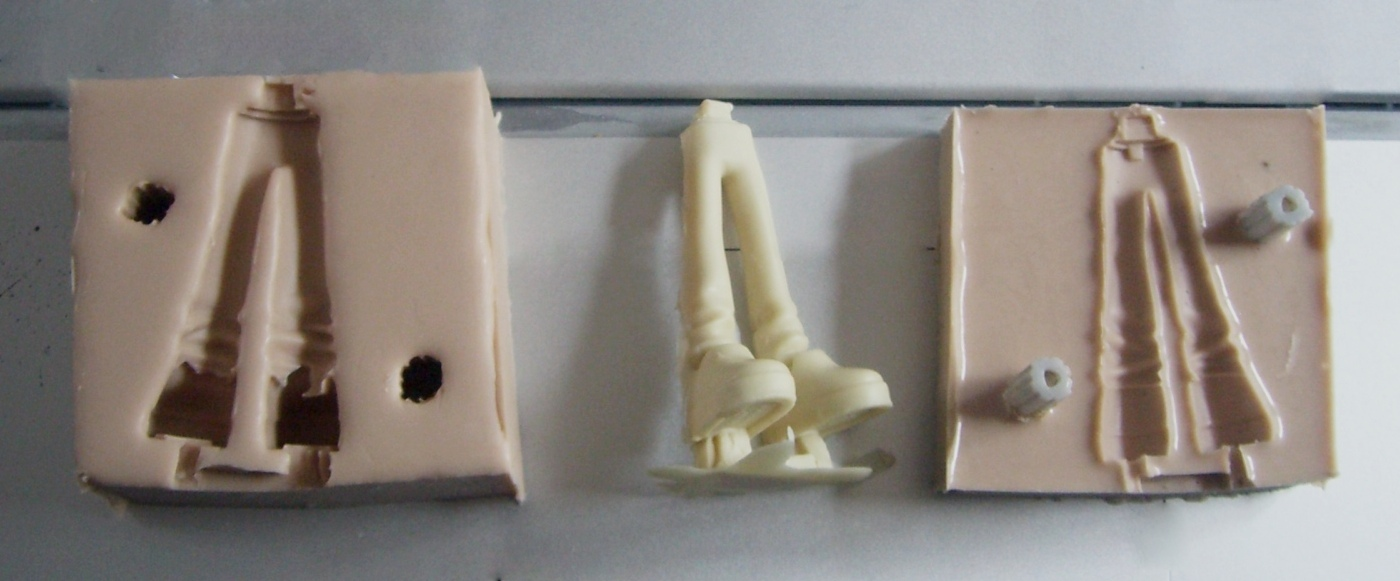
A custom resin cast Pinky:St part and two-part silicone mold

Resin casting is used to produce collectible and customized toys and figures like designer toys, garage kits and ball-jointed dolls, as well as scale models, either individual parts or entire models of objects like trains, aircraft or ships. They are generally produced in small quantities, from the tens to a few hundred copies, compared to injection-molded plastic figures which are produced in many thousands. Resin casting is more labor intensive than injection molding, and the soft molds used are worn down by each cast. The low initial investment cost of resin casting means that individual hobbyists can produce small runs for their own use, such as customization, while companies can use it to produce small runs for public sale.

The creation of a toy or figure start with the traditional sculpting process where the artist designs a clay sculpture. Where appropriate, for example when making a garage kit, the sculpture is dissected into several parts like head, torso, arms and legs. A flexible mold made from room temperature vulcanized (RTV) silicone rubber is made for each part.

After the mold has been made, a synthetic resin - such as polyurethane or epoxy - mixed with a curing agent, is poured into each mold cavity. Mixing the two liquid parts causes an exothermic reaction which generates heat and within minutes causes the material to harden, yielding castings or copies in the shape of the mold into which it has been poured. The molds are commonly half-divided (like the hollowed chocolate Easter eggs with candy inside) and a release agent may be used to make removal of the hardened/set resin from the mold easier. The hardened resin casting is removed from the flexible mold and allowed to cool.

A Baldwin 6-axle locomotive kit cast in resin in HO Scale

Due to aggressive nature of most compounds used for casting and the high temperature of the reaction the mold gradually degrades and loses small details. Typically, a flexible mold will yield between 25 and 100 castings depending upon the size of the part, the intensity of the heat generated.

Depending on the type of product it may then be cut or sanded to remove any casting artefacts like sprues and seams. Some products are also assembled and painted, while some models and kits, which are intended for the consumer to assemble, are left unfinished.

The ability of RTV silicone molds to reproduce even the tiniest detail means that many of these low volume castings are of very high quality. Quality of both original masters and resin castings varies due to differences in creator's skill, as well as casting techniques.

== See also ==
- Dental composite
- Resin dispensing
- Spin casting

== Bibliography ==
- Harper, Charles A. (2003). In Plastics Materials and Processes: A Concise Encyclopedia. Wiley-Interscience . pp. 80–82. ISBN 0-471-45603-9. Google Book Search. Retrieved on June 26, 2009.
