= Robert Tonner =

American entrepreneur and designer

- Born: July 14, 1952 (age 74); Bluffton, Indiana, U.S.
- Education: Parsons School of Design
- Occupation: C.E.O/Founder The Tonner Doll Company Inc.

Robert Tonner (born July 14, 1952) is an American entrepreneur, fashion designer, sculptor, doll artist and owner of Tonner Doll Company, Inc. and the Effanbee Doll Company, Inc.

Robert Tonner is best known for his fashion doll designs and the creation of the Tonner Doll Company, which designs a number of original doll lines, such as the Tyler Wentworth and Antoinette series. In addition, Tonner Doll Company Inc. contracts with and designs for many major film studios. They have designed dolls for such contemporary films as Harry Potter, Spider-Man 3, and Twilight, as well as classic films, such as Gone with the Wind and The Wizard of Oz.

Robert Tonner has received national and international artistic awards and recognition including a permanent piece at The Louvre Museum of Decorative Arts in Paris. He has also served as President of the National Institute of American Doll Artist (NIADA).

== Early life ==
Robert Tonner was born as a twin, to a working-class family in Bluffton, Indiana. Martin Tonner, his father, was a self-educated engineer, and his mother, Virginia, a housewife. Robert has one older brother, John; his twin brother, David; and a younger sister, Mary.

Tonner's mother Virginia was plagued with several illnesses throughout her life, including; epilepsy, encephalitis, cancer of the kidney and myasthenia gravis. The continual cost of his mother's health-care would lead to very low economic and family stability throughout Tonner's childhood.

As a child, Tonner turned to drawing and television as an escape from the difficult home-situation. Programs such as The Mickey Mouse Club, The Wonderful World of Disney, Bonanza, Bewitched, as well as many comic book superheroes, such as the members of The Justice League, would be his greatest inspiration. At the age of eight, Tonner learned to sew.

Tonner began his college career as a pre-med major, attending three different universities. However, in 1973 the struggling student abandoned his goal of becoming a surgeon and decided to pursue his true passion of becoming a fashion designer. That same year he would attend the Parsons School of Design in New York City.

== Fashion career ==
In 1975, at the age of 23, Tonner was hired as the Personal Assistant to Don Sayres, a designer for Gamut, a sportswear company located in New York City. After three years with Gamut, Tonner accepted a position with fashion designer Bill Blass and was later asked to head the Blassport label. In 1983 Tonner launched his personal fashion label, "Robert Tonner for Tudor Square".

After leaving the fashion industry, Tonner joined the National Institute of American Doll Artists (NIADA). He served as Standards chairman from 1991 to 1995 and was later elected President of NIADA 1995, a post which he held until 1997.

Tonner launched Robert Tonner Doll Design (RTDD) in 1991 with his partner, Harris Safier. The first RTDD designs were introduced at the American International Toy Fair that same year. Backed by past connections within the NIADA and fashion design world, and the aggressive publicizing by Tonner's partner Harris, RTDD saw exponential growth within the first few years. In 2000, RTDD was renamed Tonner Doll Company, Inc.

In 2006, Robert Tonner created the direct-marketing company Wilde Imagination, which built a collectible fashion doll design business based on Tonner's fictional character Ellowyne Wilde. Wilde Imagination continues to market direct to the consumer with new collections featuring Evangeline Ghastly and licensed pop-culture dolls based on The Wizard of Oz film.

Tonner returned to the world of fashion design with the introduction of the Robert Tonner 2010 Spring Collection, which debuted on September 9, 2009, at the Metropolitan Pavilion in New York City.

== Current activities ==
Robert Tonner resides in the Mid-Hudson River Valley town of Stone Ridge, New York with his family. His preferred activities include reading, following pop-culture trends and traveling for business. Tonner is the owner and director of Tonner Doll Company, Inc., as well as running his self-funded clothing line.

Still a member of NIADA, although no longer explicitly active, Tonner also belongs to the National Toy and Doll Collectors' Club in New York City, and is a sitting member of the Kingston Hospital Foundation in Kingston New York.

In October 2026, Tonner published his debut novel, Practically Human, a middle-grade science fiction book, published by Lounsbury Press.

== Publications ==
- Robert Tonner Inspirations, a personal guided tour through the culture that shaped the acclaimed doll designer's career and creations.
- The Robert Tonner Story: Dreams and Dolls, by Stephanie Finnegan.
