= Blythe (doll) =

Fashion doll line

- A customised Blythe doll
- Type: Fashion doll
- Invented by: Allison Katzman
- Company: Kenner (1972); CWC Tokyo (2001–present)
- Country: United States (1972); Japan (2001–present)
- Availability: 1972–present
- Materials: Plastic
- blythedoll.com

Blythe is a fashion doll, about 28 cm (11 inch) tall, with an oversized head and large eyes that change color with the pull of a string. It was created in 1972 and was initially only sold for one year in the United States by toy company Kenner (later purchased by Hasbro). In 2001, the Japanese toy company Takara (Note: Takara and Tomy were merged into a single company in 2006, which operates in Japan and parts of Asia as Takara Tomy, and rest of the world the Tomy.) began producing new editions of Blythe dolls. There is a network of hobbyists who customize the doll for resale and create clothing and shoes for Blythe. Enthusiasts share photographs of their work and other types of dolls on the Internet.

== History ==
In 1972, Kenner released versions of the doll with four hair colors in the U.S., a brunette with chunky bangs, a brunette with a side part, a darker brunette with thinner bangs, a blonde with a side part, a redhead with bangs, and a redhead with a side part. Twelve different outfits were released as well, along with four brightly colored wigs. The dolls were also released in Japan in 1972 by Tomy under the brand name Mahou no Hitomi Ai Ai Chan.

In 2010, Hasbro released the Blythe Loves Littlest Pet Shop line as a part of its 2004 incarnation of the Littlest Pet Shop toy line, with Blythe dolls as petsitters for their animal toys in the pre-mentioned toy-line. Blythe stars as a protagonist in the Littlest Pet Shop Presents animated shorts that were produced by Cosmic Toast Studios and released online by Hasbro. Another incarnation of the character, Blythe Baxter (voiced by Ashleigh Ball), starred in the 2012 Littlest Pet Shop animated television series.

== See also ==
- Asian fashion doll
- Ball-jointed doll
