= Fashion doll =

Doll designed to be dressed to reflect fashion trends

The original Barbie fashion doll from March 1959

Fashion dolls are dolls primarily designed to be dressed to reflect fashion trends. They are manufactured both as toys for children to play with and as collectibles for adults. The dolls are usually modeled after teen girls or adult women, though child, male, and even some non-human variants exist. Contemporary fashion dolls are typically made of vinyl or another plastic.

Barbie was released by the American toy-company Mattel in 1959, and was followed by many similar vinyl fashion dolls intended as children's toys. The size of the Barbie, 11.5 inches (290 mm), set the standard often used by other manufacturers. However, fashion dolls have been made in many different sizes varying from 10.5 to 36 inches (270 to 910 mm).

Costumers and seamstresses use fashion dolls as a canvas for their work. Customizers repaint faces, reroot hair, or do other alterations to the dolls themselves. Many of these works are one-of-a-kind and are referred to as art dolls. These artists are usually not connected to the original manufacturers and sell their work to collectors.

== Before 19th century ==
=== Early modern fashion dolls ===
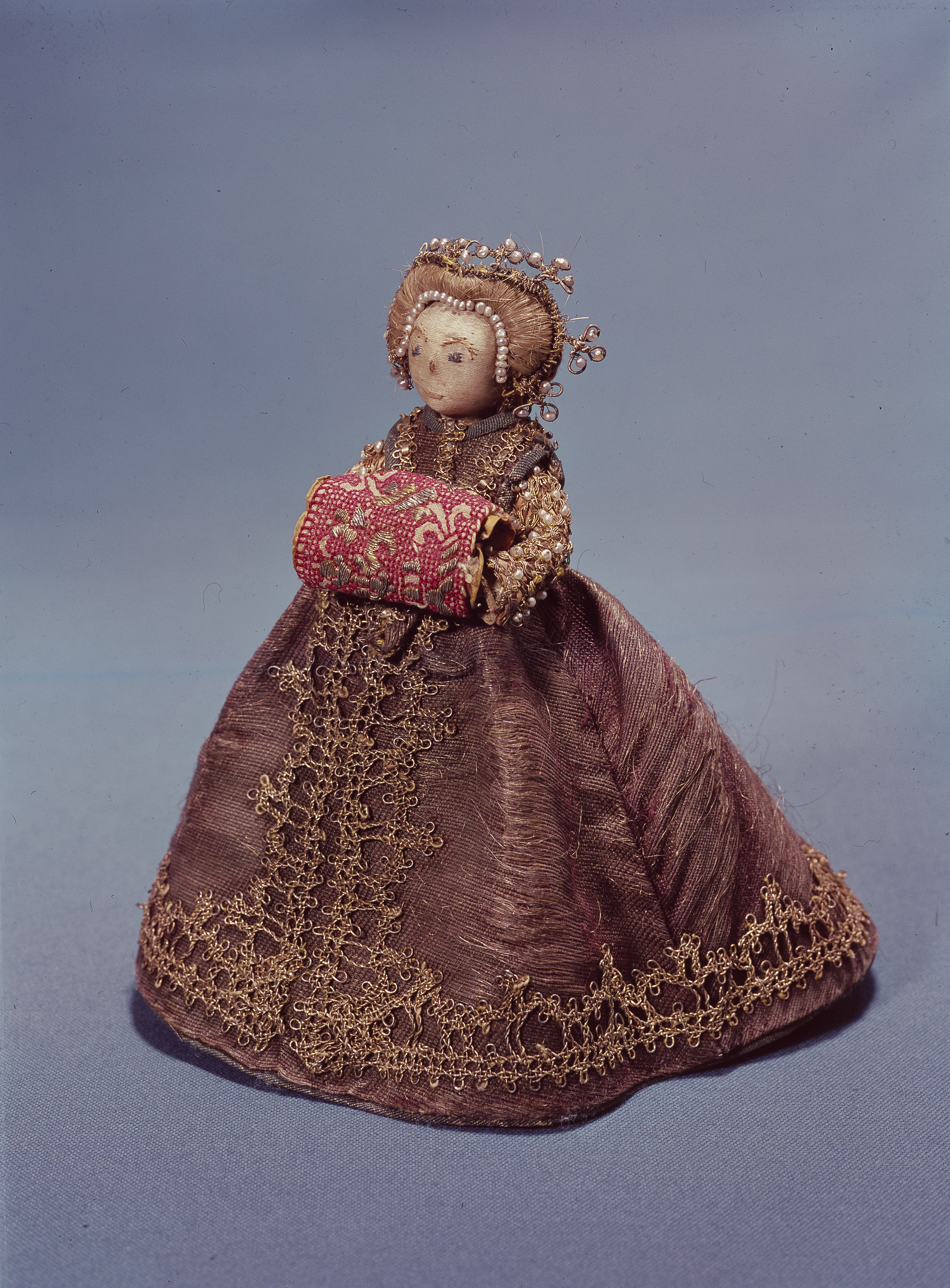
An early modern doll, c. 1600, Livrustkammaren. Owned by Christina of Holstein-Gottorp or Catherine of Sweden.

Fashion dolls may have been in use as early as the 14th century. They were in use at European royal courts in the 16th century to show the tactile qualities of fashion which could not be incorporated into paintings or described to tailors in words. A letter dated 1515 and sent by Federico Gonzaga on behalf of King Francis I of France to his mother Isabella d'Este asks her to send a fashion doll to the French court so that copies of her style might be made for the women of France.

As an adult in Scotland, Mary, Queen of Scots owned dolls, called "pippens", which were dressed by her tailors, and may have been fashion dolls. Jane Seymour, third wife of Henry VIII, owned great and little "babies" dressed in gowns of cloth of silver, satin, and velvet tied with gold "aglettes", like her own sleeves.

In April 1604, Helena Snakenborg, Marchioness of Northampton had a doll dressed in the latest fashion in London to send to her sister Karin Bonde in Sweden. During negotiations in 1611 for a marriage between Henry Frederick, Prince of Wales, and Caterina de' Medici, portraits and Italian dolls were sent as a gift from Florence to his mother Anne of Denmark.

In a treatise on collecting printed in 1565, Samuel Quiccheberg noted that princesses and queens sent each other dolls with details of foreign clothing. Jeanne d'Albret bought dolls, called poupines, in 1571.

A poet, Francesco Algarotti (1712–1764), described the display of a French fashion doll in Venice, a "piavola de Franza". He wrote that droves of women examined the details of its ribbons and petticoat. This was a means to market ribbons and dress accessories.

=== Pandora dolls ===
From around 1642 onwards some fashion dolls were called "Pandora". During the period of 1715–1785, Pandora dolls became more common and were manufactured and used by seamstresses, milliners, tailors and fashion merchants, and displayed in their shop windows and sent across borders to illustrate the latest fashion trends. Rose Bertin was among those fashion merchants who used them. Pandora dolls fell out of fashion in the late 18th century, when illustrated fashion magazines became common after the publication of Cabinet des Modes, and were finally banned by Napoleon I, who feared that they could be used to smuggle secret messages.

During the first half of the 19th century, fashion dolls were sometimes used to display fashion garments for clients before it was made in the salon of the milliner, seamstress or tailor, until Charles Frederick Worth introduced living human models in the 1850s, beginning with the modelling of his wife, Marie Vernet Worth.

== 19th century ==
=== Bisque doll ===
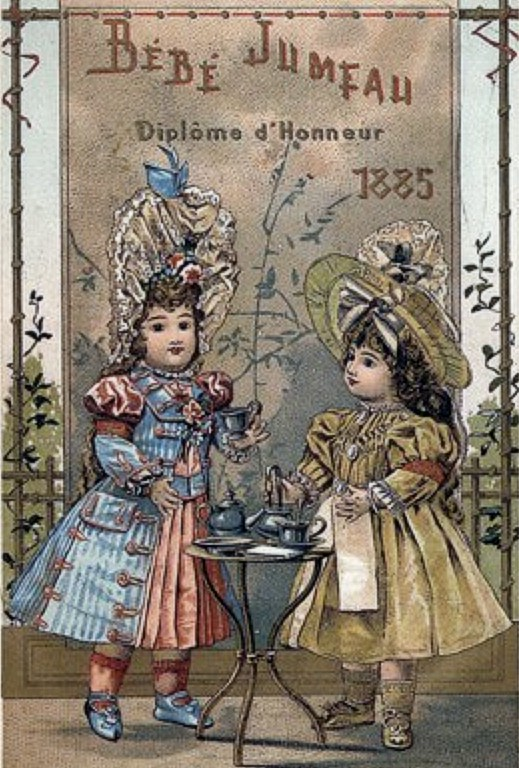
Bisque doll advertising from the French company Jumeau, 1885

The earliest bisque dolls from French companies were fashion dolls. These dominated the market between approximately 1860 and 1890. They were made to represent grown up women and intended for children of affluent families to play with and dress in contemporary fashions. These dolls came from companies like Jumeau, Bru, Gaultier, Rohmer, Simone and Huret, though their heads were often manufactured in Germany. In the Passage Choiseul area of Paris an industry grew around making clothing and accessories for the dolls. Child like bisque dolls appeared in the mid-19th century and overtook the market towards the end of the century.

== 20th century and modern age ==
=== Patty-Jo ===
Jackie Ormes contracted with the Terri Lee doll company in 1947 to produce a play doll based on her little girl cartoon character in Patty-Jo 'n Ginger. As in the cartoon, the doll represented a real child, in contrast to the majority of dolls that were mammy and Topsy-type dolls. The dolls were popular with both black and white children.

=== Cissy ===
The first American fashion doll, Cissy, was released by the Alexander Doll Company in 1955. Cissy sported a pronounced bosom and high-heeled shoes.

=== Marilú ===
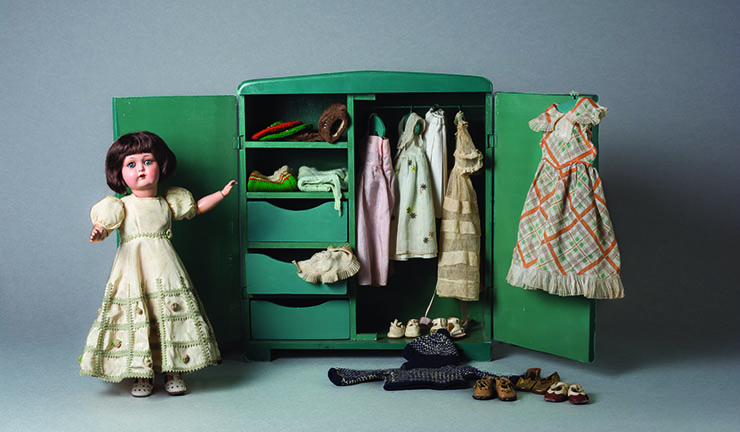
A model of the Argentine fashion doll Marilú from c. 1936–1939 along with a variety of her outfits

Marilú was an Argentine composition doll that was highly popular in the 1930s, 1940s and 1950s. It was created by Alicia Larguía, who was inspired by the French predecessor of Bleuette, a doll available through the famous magazine for girls La Semaine de Suzette The game proposed by Marilú was, on the one hand, that of the transmission of motherhood in the girls—who were called the doll's "mommies"—, but the doll's clothing also occupied a central role. The advertisements encouraged girls to change and renew the doll's clothes according to the occasion or season, with the Marilú brand thus promoting the clothes they made to accompany the toy. In addition, the Billiken and Marilú magazines included patterns for the girls or someone in their family to sew the doll's wardrobe, and published instructions and fashion tips. In this way, Marilú can be placed within the genealogy of fashion dolls, such as the Gaultier dolls, the Huret dolls, or the more recent Vogue dolls and Barbies.

=== Barbie ===
Barbie was launched by the American toy company Mattel in 1959, inspired by the German Bild Lilli doll. Barbie has been an important part of the toy fashion doll market for more than fifty years.

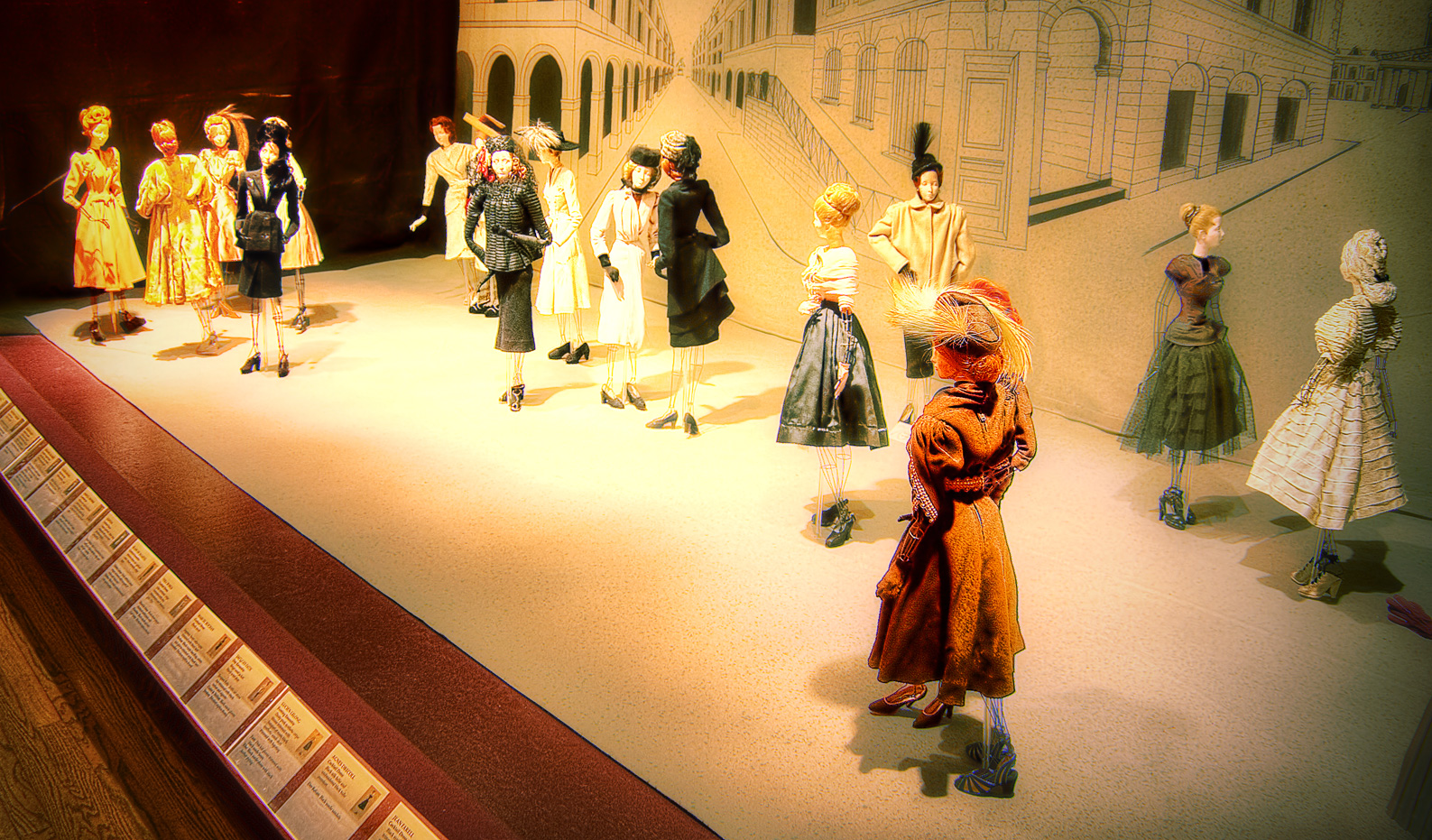
Paris-made fashion dolls from the Théâtre de la Mode (1946) on display at the Maryhill Museum of Art

Many fashion doll lines have been inspired by Barbie, or launched as alternatives to Barbie. Tammy was created by the Ideal Toy Company in 1962. Advertised as "The Doll You Love to Dress", Tammy was portrayed as a young American teenager, more "girl next door" than the cosmopolitan image of Barbie. Sindy was created by the British Pedigree Dolls & Toys company in 1963 as a rival to Barbie with a wholesome look.

=== Tressy ===
American Character Doll Company released their "Tressy" fashion doll in 1963 to compete with Barbie. Tressy was first sold as an 11½" fashion doll, and, after being acquired by the Ideal Toy Company, by the late 60s was sold as a larger pre-teen doll. Tressy featured a long swatch of hair that could be pulled out of the top of the doll's head by pushing a button on the doll's midriff; that mechanism allowed children the ability to comb the hair in a variety of styles. In the late 1960s and early 1970s Ideal released several other large fashion dolls with hair with adjustable length.

The Crissy Doll and friends along with the Velvet Doll and friends are 18". British designer Mary Quant's Daisy doll from 1973 had a large selection of contemporary 70s fashion designed by Quant.

=== Fulla doll ===
Fulla is marketed to children of Islamic and Middle-Eastern countries as an alternative to Barbie. The concept of her evolved around 1999, and she hit stores in late 2003.

=== Bratz ===
Bratz were released in 2001, designed by Carter Bryant and manufactured by California toy company MGA Entertainment. They are distinguished by large heads with skinny bodies and lush, glossy lips.

=== Later Mattel dolls ===
Mattel introduced the My Scene line in 2002 and the Flavas line in 2003 to rival Bratz.

In 2010 Mattel launched the Monster High doll line, based on fantasy and horror monsters. Subsequently, they launched a spinoff in 2013, titled Ever After High, inspired by fairytales. In 2016, both lines went through a massive reboot and were discontinued soon after. Also in 2016, Mattel launched an animal-themed line titled Enchantimals; it was originally a spinoff of Ever After High but became its own line soon after.

=== Lamm dolls ===
In 2014, artist Nickolai Lamm unveiled Lammily, a fashion doll based on Lamm's study comparing Barbie's figure with measurements matching those of an average 19-year-old woman.

=== Asian dolls ===
Asian fashion dolls are made by Asian manufacturers and primarily targeted to an Asian market. Blythe dolls with oversized heads and color changing eyes were originally made by American company Kenner but are now produced by Japanese company Takara. Another doll with an oversized head, Pullip, was created in 2003 in Korea. Japanese fashion dolls marketed to children include Licca (introduced in 1967) and Jenny (introduced in 1982) by Takara Tomy.

=== Adult collectors ===
In the mid-1990s larger fashion dolls mostly marketed to adult collectors appeared. These include Gene Marshall from Ashton-Drake, Tyler Wentworth from Tonner and Alexandra Fairchild Ford from Madame Alexander. They are between 15.5 and 16 inches (390 and 410 millimetres), larger than typical fashion dolls marketed as children's toys.

== See also ==
- Action figure
- Ball-jointed doll
- Celebrity doll
- Paper doll
