= Tonner Doll Company =

American collectible doll design

Tonner Doll Company, Inc.
- Company type: Private
- Industry: High-end fashion doll design, production, marketing, and distribution
- Founded: 1991; 35 years ago
- Founder: Robert Tonner
- Defunct: 2018; 8 years ago
- Headquarters: Kingston, New York, United States
- Area served: Worldwide

Tonner Doll Company, Inc. was a collectible doll design and distribution company located in Kingston, New York. Founded by Robert Tonner in 1991, Tonner Doll designed and marketed original doll lines, as well as a number of licensed dolls for films such as Harry Potter, Spider-Man 3, and Twilight. Its original products included the Tyler Wentworth, Kitty Collier, and Antoinette series.

== History ==
Tonner Doll Company, Inc. was founded in 1991 by Robert Tonner under the name Robert Tonner Doll Designs (RTDD). Originally, the company had only three employees: Tonner, his partner Harris Safier, and a part-time seamstress. In February 1991, RTDD made its public debut at the American International Toy Fair in New York City, displaying multi-jointed porcelain fashion dolls and jointed porcelain child dolls in limited editions. Prices ranged from $650 to $1500.

In 1995, Tonner Doll gained licensing rights for the recreation of the 1950s paper doll Betsy McCall for reintroduction to the collector's market. To keep costs down, Tonner decided to produce the doll in China. Made from vinyl, the Betsy McCall-license series was one of the company's initial mainstream commercial successes.

Over the following years, as RTDD's business grew, so did its staff. This growth would lead to the company being renamed the Tonner Doll Company. By 2000, Tonner Doll employed 24 people, including designers, marketers, and various sales and administrative staff.

In 2017, the company released its first transgender doll, modeled after activist Jazz Jennings.

In December 2018, the Tonner Doll company officially closed.

== Licensing ==
Tonner Doll had the licensing rights to design and develop dolls based on many American television, cinema, comic book, and video game franchises.

Since the 1995 issue of the Betsy McCall doll, Tonner Doll had gained the merchandising rights for characters in films like 1997's Titanic (Kate Winslet) and 1999's Star Wars: Episode I – The Phantom Menace (Natalie Portman). In 2006, Tonner Doll gained licensing rights to recreate the cast of the Harry Potter series, as well as characters from Memoirs of a Geisha. Tonner Doll licensed comic book heroes and villains from DC Comics for its DC STARS Collection. The line included 13-, 17-, and 22-inch dolls, including various versions of Aquaman, Batgirl, Batman, Black Canary, Catwoman, Donna Troy, Dove, Green Lantern, Harley Quinn, Hawkwoman, Huntress, Joker, Lois Lane, Mera, Poison Ivy, Power Girl, Raven, Starfire, Supergirl (Linda Danvers), Superman, Wonder Woman, and Zatanna.

Over time, Tonner Doll also licensed the Twilight Saga, Lara Croft, Tomb Raider: Legend, Chicago, Dreamgirls, The Chronicles of Narnia, The Golden Compass, Mary Engelbreit's Ann Estelle, Fancy Nancy, Thèâtre de la Mode, Dick Tracy, Get Smart, Disney Princesses, Mary Poppins, Davy Crockett, Pirates of the Caribbean, Ava Gardner, Joan Crawford, Bette Davis, Miss Piggy, Miss America, and characters from the comic strip For Better or for Worse by Lynn Johnston. Additional licenses included Tim Burton's Alice in Wonderland, The Lord of the Rings, Disney's Prince of Persia, and Disney Princess Tiana.

== Buyout ==
In 2002 Tonner Doll purchased the Effanbee Doll Company, Inc. to obtain the rights to their characters. They gained exclusive rights to Bernard Lipfert's 1928 Patsy doll, Patsyette. Effanbee also had the rights to reproduce fashion dolls licensed by Tribune Media, like the Brenda Starr, Girl Reporter series, and the comic strip Little Orphan Annie.

For the first few years after the buyout, Effanbee remained an independent subsidiary of Tonner; however, the two eventually became a conglomerate run under a singular management. The Effanbee doll lines were designed, produced, marketed and distributed by Tonner while retaining the Effanbee name.
