= Volks =

Japan-based corporation

Volks Inc.
- Native name: 株式会社ボークス
- Romanized name: Kabushiki-gaisha Bōkusu
- Founded: December 3, 1972; 53 years ago
- Founder: Hideyuki Shigeta
- Headquarters: Shimogyō-ku, Kyoto, Japan
- Key people: Setsu Shigeta (Representative Director)
- Products: Super Dollfie, Dollfie, Garage kits
- Website: Official website

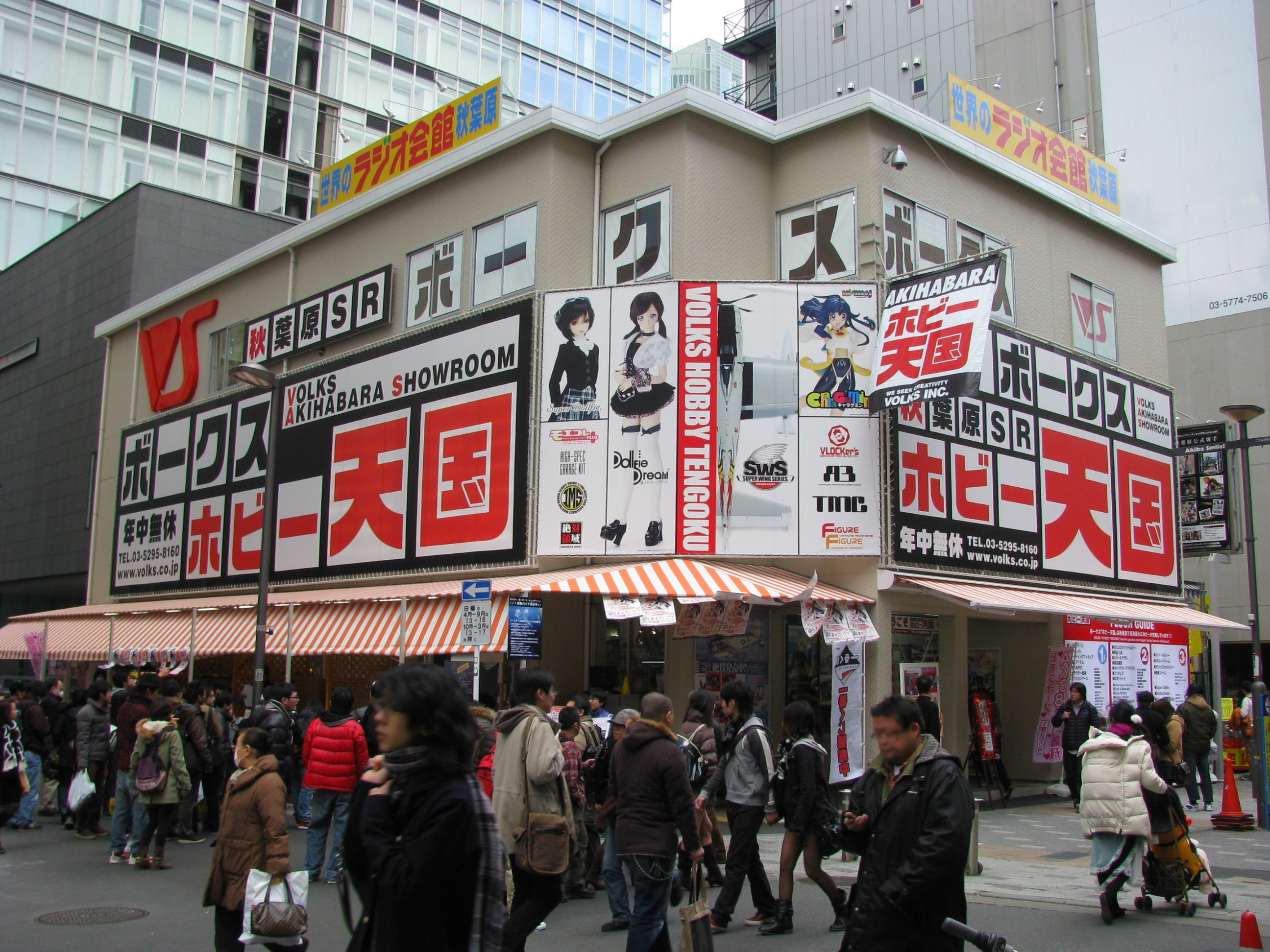
Volks Akihabara Hobby Tengoku

Volks Inc. (Note: Japanese: 株式会社ボークス, Hepburn: Kabushiki gaisha Bōkusu) is a Japan-based corporation that produces garage kits and mecha kits as well as the Dollfie, Super Dollfie and Dollfie Dream lines of dolls. The company's headquarters is in Kyoto, with some 30 shops worldwide, and annual sales of about $50 million as of 2008.

== History ==
Volks began as a small hobby shop in 1972. In the late 1990s they produced the first Dollfie dolls, and in 1999 the first Super Dollfie doll was created by Akihiro Enku. In November 2005, Volks USA opened their first American Tenshi no Sumika store in Los Angeles, California.

== Corporate structure and products ==
Volks is organized into three different enterprises. Volks Inc. is the main umbrella company. They operate the Tenshi-no-Sato museum in Kyoto, the Volks Showrooms in Japan, and the Tenshi-no-Sumika shops in Japan, Korea, and the United States. Zoukei-Mura is Volks' sculpting, designing, and assembly department for Super Dollfie. Virginal Art is Volks' marketing and design department with a focus on the hobby market.

Hideyuki Shigeta is the president of Volks Inc. Several sculptors are working under Zoukei-Mura, most notably Akihiro Enku, the creator of Super Dollfie. Artist Gentaro Araki briefly worked with Volks creating the U-noss line of dolls. There are also several designers working with the Super Dollfie line of dolls. The main designer, Mikey, is the daughter of Volks' president Shigeta. Some other notable designers are K. Mayura, Valico, Aone and Ciera.

Volks regularly publish the magazine Volks News with information about new products from all of their lines.

Volks have created resin kit figures of characters from a large variety of anime and manga, such as My-HiME, Love Hina, Neon Genesis Evangelion and Oh My Goddess!, along with video game franchises, such as Shantae. They also have their own line of figures called A-Brand.

They have also created Super Dollfie dolls based on characters from anime and manga such as Chobits, Maria-sama ga Miteru and Rozen Maiden. Volks have also collaborated with Lolita fashion brands like Baby, The Stars Shine Bright, H. Naoto, Black Peace Now and Atelier-Pierrot to create Super Dollfie outfits.
