= Jenny (doll) =

10 1/2-inch fashion doll

Takara Jenny

Jenny (ジェニー, Jenī) is a 10½ inch fashion doll produced by Takara (the Japanese toy company now known as Takara Tomy) since 1982. The doll was known as Takara Barbie, and in 1986 the doll was renamed "Jenny" after Takara ended their licensing agreement with Mattel.

Takara Barbie is different from a western Barbie that the former was altered to better appeal to Japanese preferences, with a shorter height, large rounded manga-style eyes and a closed mouth. Like her Western counterpart, Jenny wears a large variety of outfits, which often include street fashion, school uniforms, kimono, and other unique Japanese costumes, such as "Bullet-Train Stewardess Jenny".

== Name ==
Prior to 1986, the doll was known as Takara Barbie. In 1986 Takara ended their licensing agreement with Mattel, and, as they owned the rights over the Takara Barbie's design, came up with a new name for the doll. The explanation given for the name change was that Jenny was the name of a character Barbie portrayed in a play, also titled Jenny. The play was a success and Barbie had become so associated with her character's name that she decided to change it to Jenny. Jenny's boyfriend was renamed from "Takara Ken" to "Jeff".

== See also ==
- Asian fashion doll
- Licca-chan
- Barbie
