= Resin dispensing =

A resin dispensing system is a technical installation to process casting resin for the purpose of filling, sealing, covering or soaking technical parts, especially in the field of electricity and electronics like transformers, LCDs and other devices of various size.

Due to progressing miniaturization and introduction of electronics into new areas, quality requirements for the parts are rising, and thus the quality of dispensing must be increased as well. To obtain the required quality, on one hand, the resin system has to be developed and optimized accordingly. On the other hand, the resin dispensing system has to work more and more precisely to obtain best dispensing. Because of continuously increasing cost pressure, casting devices must be capable of increased quality, while also becoming faster and more reliable.

== Requirements for good dispensing ==
First of all, by dispensing, electrical and electronic parts have to be insulated reliably and penetration of moisture has to be excluded totally. Very often heat has to be conducted out from the part properly, an attribute that can be improved by the choice of an appropriate resin e.g. epoxy, polyurethane or silicone.

== Process steps in a dispensing system ==
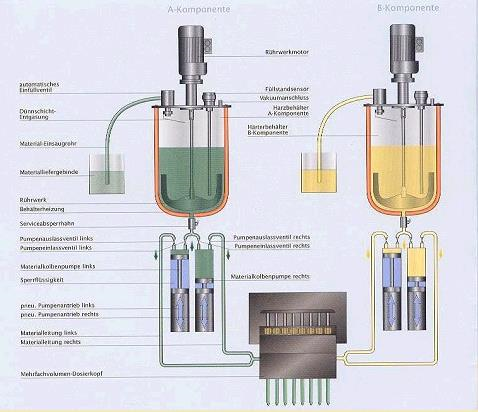
Schematic illustration of a resin casting system

In a dispensing system the following processes have to be performed:

- Conditioning of the resin mix
- Material transportation
- Metering
- Mixing
- Casting

A good resin dispensing system provides high quality casting of the same high standard even during long series in mass production.

== Conditioning ==
Several properties of the resin mix, with or without filler material, one component or two components (resin + hardener), are crucial for the quality of the product:

- Even distribution of the fillers (no settling)
- Elimination of air and moisture
- Constant, often elevated temperature to maintain low viscosity

Even distribution of the fillers without setting is maintained by ongoing stirring.

Air and moisture are eliminated by evacuating the material tanks.

Elevated temperature is reached and maintained by thoroughly controlled heating of the tanks, the material feeding lines, the pumps and metering heads. In filled, complex resin mixes conditioning is especially crucial for the quality of the product.

== Material transportation ==
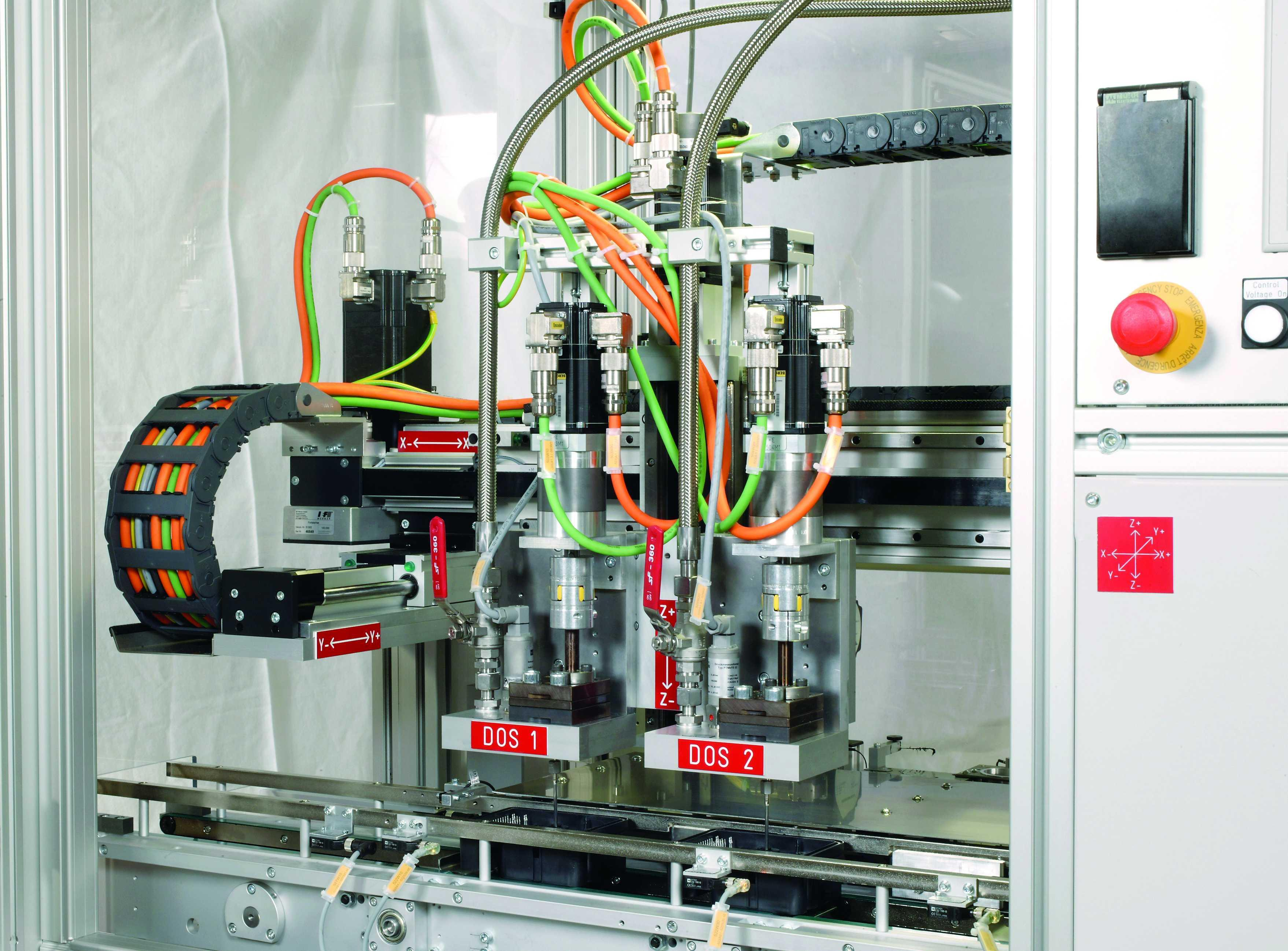
Resin casting unit with two metering units (gear pumps)

Which kind of feeding pump has to be used depends mainly on the viscosity of the material and the abrasiveness of the fillers.

For low to medium viscous material:

- Piston pumps
- Eccentric screw pumps
- Progressive cavity pumps
- Gear pumps

Gear pumps are not fit for abrasive material

For highly viscous material follower plate pumps are connected with an eccentric screw pump or a scooping piston pump. Metering is controlled for mass, time, and volume to determine the amount of resin dispensed.

=== Metering by mass ===
Weighing provides very exact determination of amount, but it lengthens the cycle time. Also, a scale within a production line can be quite sensitive to malfunction and hard to use on boards populated with many parts. Because of these issues, this method is rarely used.

=== Metering by using Volume ===
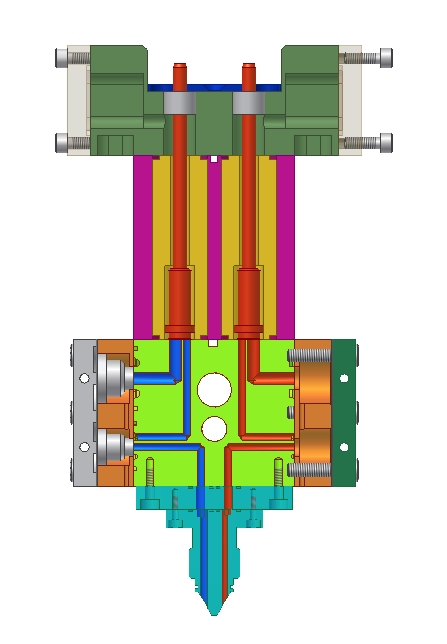
Longitudinal section through a metering head for two components (resin left, hardener right)

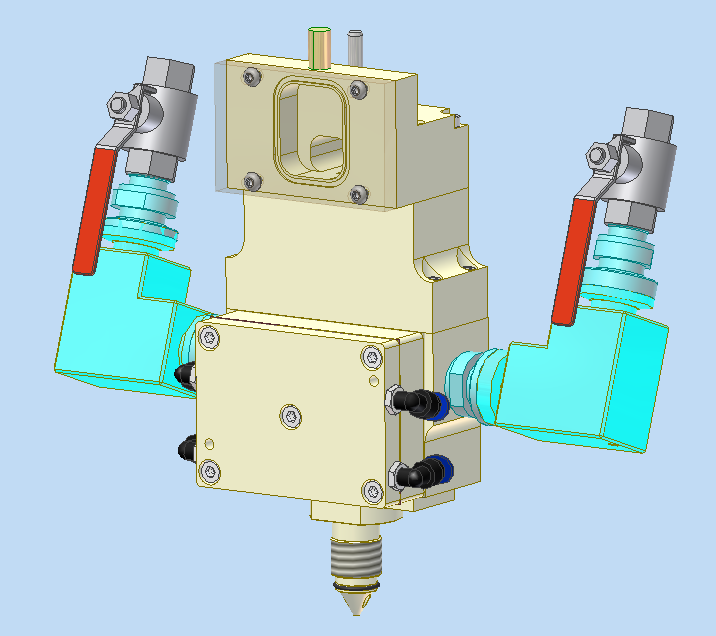
Metering head for single component (piston metering head)

Getting constant volume is, technically, relatively simple and metering systems relying on constant volume dispensing therefore are especially simple and reliable.

A very good way is the use of piston metering heads. The ratio of resin to hardener can be determined exactly by the ratio of the width of two separate pistons, one for resin, one for hardener, where both pistons are pushed simultaneously. The amount is determined by a common stopper, limiting the stroke of both pistons equally.

State of the art (2009) are metering volumes from 0,01 mL to about 250 mL, may be even more.

=== Metering by using time ===
This method demands that the appropriate pumps provide precisely constant flow of the material. Flow of material is started by a controlled valve and stopped after a certain time.

This method is especially susceptible to metering flaws, because the slightest change in flow speed causes different amounts of dispensed resin and/or hardener. Providing for an absolutely constant flow calls for relatively high electronic complexity, but provides much greater flexibility in adjusting the proportions of hardener to resin.

== Mixing ==
In two component resins, thorough mixing is crucial to obtain equal reaction between resin and hardener throughout all the material. There are three possible ways to mix:

- static mixing tube
- dynamic blender
- dynamic static mixing tube

=== Static mixing tube ===
The components meet in a mixing tube made of plastic. The tube contains immobile walls to divide and bring together the material several times, mixing resin and hardener by this process. The mixing tube is not cleaned after use, but discarded.

advantages: no moving parts, no post-process cleaning, no residue of cleaning liquid
disadvantages: mixing tubes as litter, intensity of mixing can hardly be varied

=== Dynamic mixing ===
The components meet in a mixing chamber, usually made of stainless steel and there they are mixed homogeneously by a rotating blender. To optimize mixing, the rotational speed can be controlled electronically. Mixing chamber and blender have to be cleaned with a special cleaning fluid to be used again. Usually this happens automatically.

advantage: the mixing intensity can be controlled exactly.
disadvantages: more due to failure because of moving parts, cleaning required, possibly residue of cleaning fluid, used cleaning fluid is waste or even hazardous waste, expensive replacement or cleaning of the chamber in case of encrustation because of hardened resin within the mixing chamber.

=== Static-dynamic mixing ===
A mixing tube made from plastic contains a helix driven by an external motor. This method is rarely used.

== Dispensing ==
To provide for best casting, the part and the dispensing unit have to be moved relatively to each other. In principle there are two ways:

- Movement of the dispensing unit
- Movement of the part

For many applications, dispensing can only be done successfully in vacuum. This is true especially for parts with a large undercut, i.e. soaking of transformation coils. In such cases bubble free dispensing can only be obtained in vacuum. For this purpose dispensing systems are equipped with vacuum chambers. To shorten cycle times there can be an airlock at the entrance and one at the exit. In vacuum dispensing only systems where the parts are moving and the dispenser remains in place can be built reasonably.

For the production of series, dispensing systems with multifold metering heads can be used. At this time (2006) there are systems running capable to do up to thirty dispensing acts simultaneously.

=== Variability of dispensing ===
The most simple way of dispensing is, to cast a certain amount of resin into one spot of a not moving part. Such simple systems sometimes are called metering systems. Centrifugal casting tables are available. The mold is fixed on this rotary table and while the resin mix is dispensed into the mold, centrifugal force ensures a solid, clean bubble free fill. The part is also stronger due to stress hardening. In some cases, the parts are equal to pressure injection dispensing.

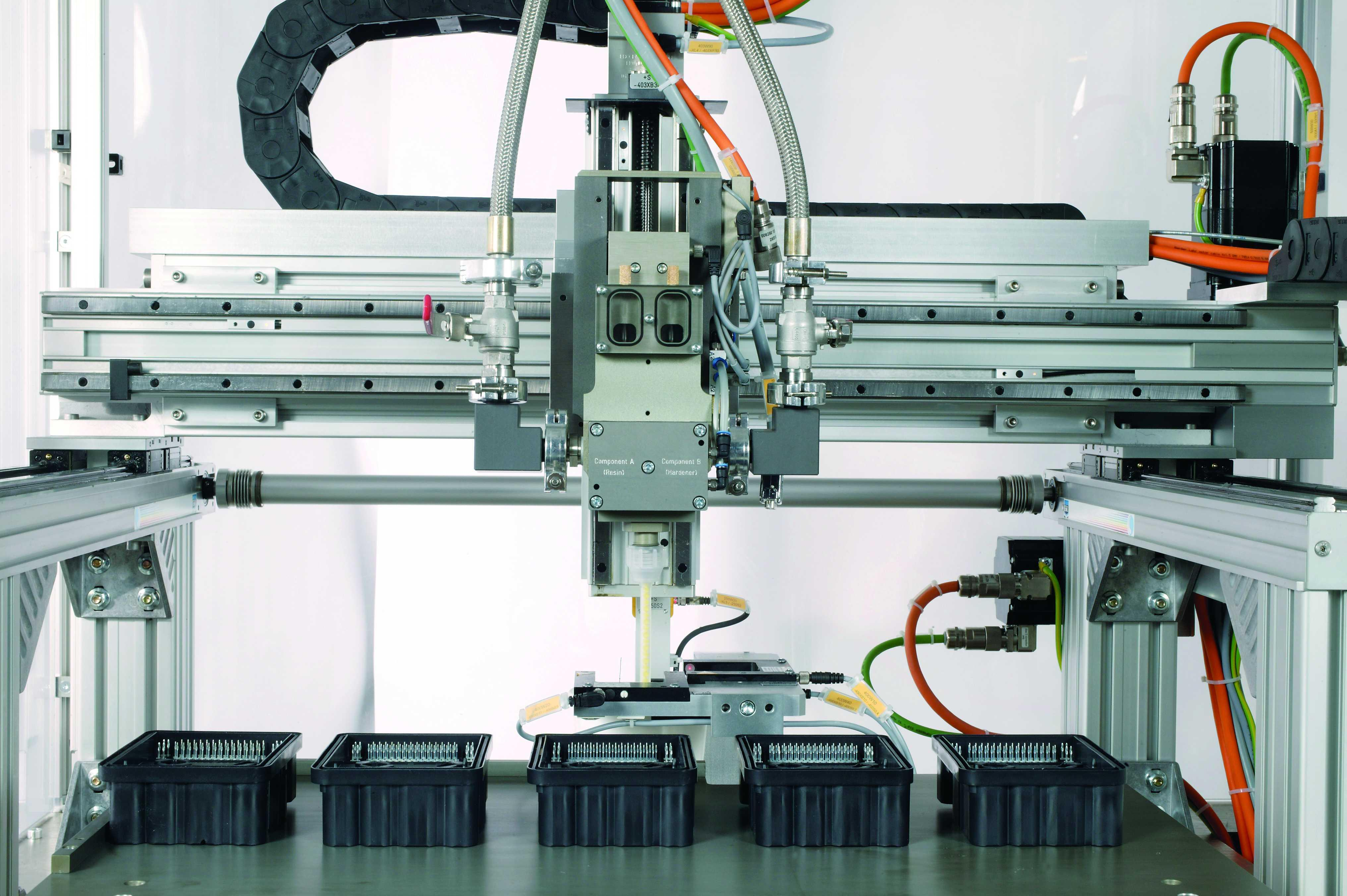
Single metering unit for two components, mounted on portal system to move the metering unit, CNC-controlled

By using adequate controls, many variations of casting are available. For instance, dams can be cast in different forms. Cast from highly viscous, thixotropic material, dams can be filled with resin of low viscosity (dam & fill). The deposition speed of the resin can be varied during casting or casting can be done in several portions. At the same time the part can execute complex movements. Using additional options of that kind make it possible to solve difficult casting problems.

== Implementation of Dispensing into a Production Line ==
A casting system can be combined with many different production steps within a production line. So casting becomes an integrated part of the whole manufacturing of a part. To account for the delicate requirements of dispensing in all production steps in the best way, the most significant manufacturers are active in automation as well. The newest development in this area is the design of a production line from prefabricated, ideally adapted modules and robotics. This speeds up the development of individual solutions and decreases their costs.

== Examples for Application of Dispensing ==
More and more parts are sealed by casting, because this accelerates the production and increases the lifetime and functionality of the parts. On the other side, sealed parts cannot be repaired.

=== Sealing of electronic parts ===
Electronic units, plugged into a board, usually are sealed by resin to protect them from environmental influences and from mechanical damage. In those cases dispensing usually means just to fill up a form, a relatively simple process.

=== Production of LEDs ===
Light-emitting diodes are produced in fully automated lines. Part of it is the dispensing in transparent plastics. Here short working cycles are of great significance to lower the price of the little lights. This an example for the use of multiple metering heads.

=== Soaking of electrical windings ===
In electric motors and in transformers, multiple layers of windings of fine copper wire are essential. Today they usually are soaked in resin to protect them from environmental influences and to improve insulation from each other. Because of the fine structure of the space between the windings and because of much undercut, soaking of such windings puts highest demands to the used dispensing device.

== See also ==
- Microdispensing
- Resin casting
