= Licca-chan =

Japanese dress-up doll series

- First appearance: July 4, 1967; 59 years ago
- Created by: Miyako Maki

In-universe information
- Full name: Licca Kayama (香山リカ, Kayama Rika)
- Nickname: Licca-chan

Licca-chan (リカちゃん, Rika-chan) is a Japanese fashion doll launched on July 4, 1967, by Takara, and created by former shōjo manga artist Miyako Maki. Enjoying the same kind of popularity in Japan as the Barbie series does in the United States, Takara had sold over 48 million Licca-chan dolls as of 2002, and over 53 million as of 2007.

Takara has provided an extensive background story for the Licca-chan doll, including an age (11), where she attends school, names and occupations for her parents, and her favorite books (Anne of Green Gables and A Little Princess). Licca-chan also likes Doraemon.

In 2001, a pregnant adult version of Licca-chan was introduced, which included a postcard the purchaser could send to Takara for a baby doll. The baby came with a key which allowed the doll to be returned to its standard proportions. The release of the doll happened to coincide with the birth of Aiko, the daughter of Crown Prince Naruhito and Crown Princess Masako of Japan, a factor which helped boost the sales of the new doll. Since then, other versions of Licca-chan have been introduced, including a new "Departure Licca", released just ahead of the 40th anniversary in 2007. A Licca-chan video game was released for the Nintendo DS in Japan on November 29, 2007. This game was later released in the U.S. on October 14, 2008, as Lovely Lisa.

== History ==
In 1966, Takara planned to enter the dress-up doll market taking advantage of their knowledge of the plastic process. The initial plan was for the company to produce a portable dollhouse, for dolls of other companies like Mattel. The necessary size was larger than anticipated and therefore considered unsuitable for Japanese houses and portability. They decided to produce a 21 cm tall fashion doll that would adopt characteristics of an anime girl. Miyako Maki was put in charge of the illustration of the initial advertisements and was credited in the form of "supervised by Maki-sensei".

The name "Licca-chan" was decided by the general public in the July 1967 issue of the monthly girl manga magazine "Ribon". Subsequently, the name "Licca" became known as a name that worked both domestically and abroad. Two years after the launch in 1969, the dolls were popular enough to cause Mattel (makers of the Barbie doll) to move its production base to another country, focusing less on sales in Japan. Licca-chan started exceeding Barbie sales and became the most popular Japanese dress-up doll brand. Despite enduring popularity, Licca-chan dolls suffered a decline in sales in the 1990s due to rival dolls based on anime like Sailor Moon. In 1996, Licca-chan returned to the top sales of dress-up dolls again.

Even now, Licca-chan is highly recognized and it is even used as a generic name for dress-up dolls. From its high recognition from the Takara era to the current Takara Tomy, Licca is positioned as a mascot.

Rough Trade Records teamed up with Takara in the late 90s to release "Street Licca", a DJ that carried a Rough Trade record satchel and doll-sized LPs from the labels' artists. Along with her Ursula 1000, Gants and Spearmint records, she toted a pair of pink Converse running shoes, grey "leather" pants, headphones, layered hoody and a blonde bob haircut. Street Licca was the ultimate "indie rock" doll.

In the early 1980s, Takara attempted a short-lived expansion of the brand to the United States and other western markets under the name Lisa. In 2026, the line was relaunched in the country under its original name with a target audience of adult collectors rather than children.

== Product development ==
Licca-chan dolls placed a new value on play. The objective of the doll was "to provide dreams for girls". These dolls taught traditional women's roles, such as cooking, washing, and cleaning. Many Licca-chan dolls, dresses, playsets, and accessories were sold in sets, as well as separately. Since the doll's inception, there was emphasis within the company to develop toys from a child's perspective. This was the philosophy that Yasuhiro Kojima, a former senior managing director, lived by, and it still remains the founding philosophy of the product development team.

In the fictional setting Licca-chan lives in, she was born to a Japanese mother and a French father. Most customers don't know this, and believe she is entirely Japanese. This makes the doll a novel concept in Japan, where mixed-race people are rarer and culturally seen as exotic.

== Product specifications ==
The specifications of the Licca-chan doll has changed over time. The doll is currently on its fourth generation. The first generation was launched in 1967. Licca-chan had brown curly hairs with bangs. Her charm point was the one white star in her eyes. The second generation was launched in 1972. Licca-chan's hair was more reddish brown and her bangs were parted. The stars in her eyes increased to three and she wore magnetic heels. The third generation was launched in 1982. Licca-chan's hair is a lighter brown and it is straight. Her body size is the same as the second generation and her mouth is open instead of closed. The fourth generation Licca-chan was launched in 1987. Licca-chan's hair is close to blond and her eyes were bigger. Her body grew by 1cm making her height 22cm.

Licca-chan, her family and friends evolved generation by generation to reflect the vogue of the time period. She depicted fashion, careers and family life of that era. Her parents were also known as an ideal married couple, ideal parents leading to an ideal family life.

== In other media ==
- Licca-chan is a playable character in the 1996 fighting game Battle Arena Nitoshinden and the 2003 fighting game DreamMix TV World Fighters, released by Hudson Soft for the GameCube and PlayStation 2 in Japan.
- Licca-chan makes an appearance in the manga series Kiben Gakuha, Yotsuya Senpai no Kaidan.

== See also ==
- Super Doll Licca-chan (anime television series)
- Jenny
- Asian fashion doll
