= Garage kit =

Assembly scale model kit

A garage kit (ガレージキット) or resin kit is an assembly scale model kit most commonly cast in polyurethane resin.

They are often model figures portraying humans or other living creatures. In Japan, kits often depict anime characters, and in the United States, depictions of movie monsters are common. However, kits can be produced depicting a wide range of subjects, from characters in horror, science fiction, fantasy films, television and comic books to nudes, pin-up girls and original works of art, as well as upgrade and conversion kits for existing models and airsoft guns.

Originally garage kits were amateur-produced, and the term originated with dedicated hobbyists using their garages as workshops. Unable to find model kits of subjects they wanted on the market, they began producing kits of their own. As the market expanded, professional companies began making similar kits. Sometimes a distinction is made between true garage kits, made by amateurs, and resin kits, manufactured professionally by companies.

Because of the labor-intensive casting process, garage kits are usually produced in limited numbers and are more expensive than injection-molded plastic kits. The parts are glued together using cyanoacrylate or an epoxy cement and the completed figure is painted. Some figures are sold completed, but most commonly they are sold in parts for the buyer to assemble and finish.

== Japan ==
Japanese garage kits are often anime figures depicting popular characters. Another major subject is "Kaiju" monsters such as Godzilla, and they may also include subjects such as mecha and science fiction spaceships. Garage kits can be as simple as a one piece figure, or as complex as kits with well over one hundred parts. Most commonly they are cast in polyurethane resin, but may also be fabricated of diverse substances such as soft vinyl, white metal (a type of lead alloy) and fabric.

Originally the kits were sold and traded between hobbyists at conventions like Wonder Festival. As the market grew, a number of companies began producing resin kits professionally, such as Federation Models, Volks, WAVE/Be-J, Kaiyodo, Kotobukiya and B-Club, a subsidiary of Bandai producing Gundam kits (Gunpla).

The scale of figure kits varies, but as of 2008, 1/8 seems to be the predominant scale. Prior to 1990 the dominant scale was 1/6. This scale shrink coincided with the rise in material, labor, and licensing costs. Other scales, such as 1/3, 1/4, 1/6, 1/7 also exist, but are less common. Larger kits (1/3, 1/4, etc.) generally command higher prices due to the greater amounts of material required to produce them.

Japanese garage kits are usually cast as separate parts which are packed with instructions and sometimes photographs of the final product. Most professionally manufactured kits come in a box while amateur-produced kits sold at conventions come in plastic bags, blank boxes or even boxes with copied sheet information glued onto them. They are not painted, but some of them do have decals provided by the sculptor or circle. The builder then paints and assembles the model, ideally using an airbrush. However, they can also be painted with a regular brush using a variety of techniques to achieve similar effects as when painting with a conventional airbrush.

== United States ==
In the 1950s and 60s, Aurora and other companies produced cheap plastic models of movie monsters, comic book heroes, and movie and television characters. This market has since disappeared, but through the 1980s an underground market grew through which enthusiasts could acquire the old plastic model kits.

In the early to mid-1980s, hobbyists began creating their own garage kits of movie monsters. There was a small but enthusiastic market for these new model kits. They were poured into flexible molds which could produce rigid reproductions of new figures which were then sculpted more accurately and with more detail than the old plastic model kits. They were usually produced in limited numbers and sold primarily by mail order and at toy and hobby conventions.

In the mid- to late 1980s the monster model kit hobby grew toward the mainstream. By the 1990s, model kits were produced in the US and the UK, as well as in Japan, and distributed through hobby and comic stores. There was an unprecedented variety of licensed model figure kits.

In the late 1990s, model kit sales went down. Hobby and comic stores and their distributors began either carrying fewer garage kits or closing down, along with their producers.

As of 2009, there are two American garage kit magazines, Kitbuilders Magazine and Amazing Figure Modeler, and there are garage kit conventions held annually, like WonderFest USA in Louisville, Kentucky.

== Production ==
Garage kits are generally produced in small quantities, from the tens to a few hundred copies, compared to injection-molded plastic kits which are produced in many thousands. This is due to the labor-intensive nature of the manufacturing process and the relatively low market demand.

Resin casting garage kit production is the most labor-intensive. The upside is that creating the initial mold is much less costly than in the injection-molding process.

Vinyl garage kits are produced by using liquid vinyl Plastisol in a spin casting process known as slush molding. It is more complex than resin casting, but less expensive and less sophisticated than the injection molding used for most plastic products. It is not something that is commonly done in a basement or garage.

== Intellectual property issues ==
The legality of amateur garage kits can be questionable as they are not always properly licensed. The model might be of a copyrighted character or design that was produced by fans because no official model exists.

The relatively low initial investment and ease of resin casting means that it's also easy to create recast copies of existing original kits. Recasts are produced by making molds of parts from original model kits and then doing recasts from the new molds. This can be done for personal use, such as modification of an existing kit, but unlicensed recast copies are sometimes sold unlawfully. In some cases the original kit is no longer available, but in others they are still in active production. The recasts can be of officially licensed model kits, but when they are of unlicensed kits the sculptor usually has a hard time pursuing litigation. The recasts are usually of inferior quality when produced in Thailand, however, other recasters in Hong Kong rival originals in quality and casting and offer at a price that undercuts the original. Recast kits can be found on online auction sites, where they can be difficult to control due to potential cumbersome site policies and seller pseudonymity. Many recasters are in East Asia but can be found all over the globe.

In an effort to legitimize amateur garage kit production and sales in Japan, it is not uncommon for a license holder to issue a 'single day license' (ja:当日版権システム) where for one day only, license is granted for the sale of amateur garage kits. These licensing agreements are typically negotiated between an event organizer (Wonder Festival, Character Hobby, Figure Mania, etc.) and various licensing entities for license to characters from specific TV shows and movies. Typically, the event organizer publishes a list of licenses available in advance, and sculptors intending to sell their sculptures then submit applications (including photos of their sculpture) for approval. Applications may be rejected.
