= Action figure =

Character toy figurine made commonly of plastic

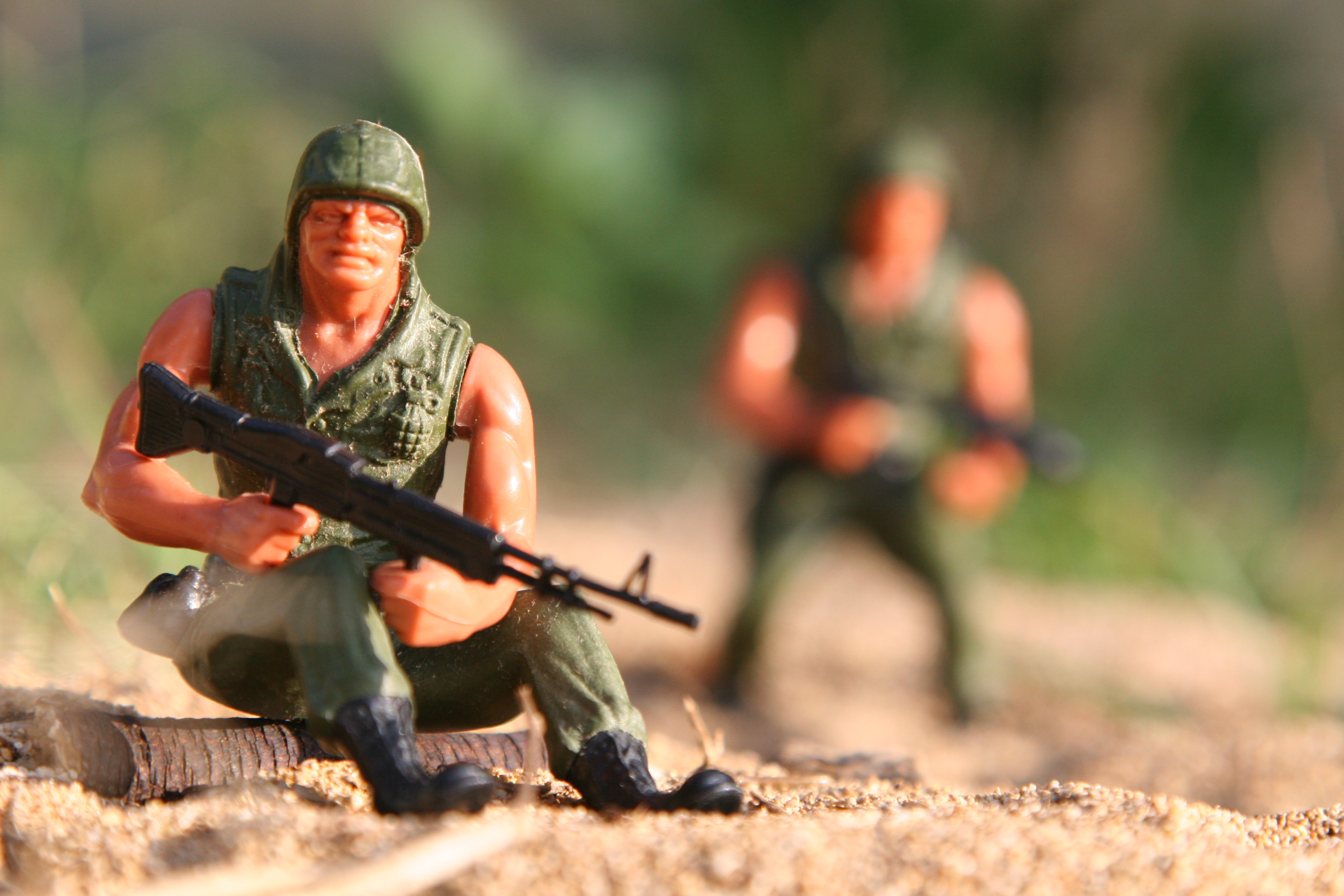
- Mattel "Heroes in Action" soldiers
- Type: Model figure
- Invented by: Hasbro
- Country: various
- Availability: 1964–present
- Materials: usually plastic

An action figure is a poseable character model figure made most commonly of plastic, and often based upon characters from a film, comic book, military, video game, television program, or sport; fictional or historical. These figures are usually marketed toward boys and adult collectors. The term was coined by Hasbro in 1964 to market G.I. Joe to boys (while competitors called similar offerings boy's dolls).

According to a 2005 study in Sweden, action figures which display traditional masculine traits primarily target boys. While most commonly marketed as a child's toy, the action figure has gained widespread acceptance as collector item for adults. In such a case, the item may be produced and designed on the assumption it will be bought solely for display as a collectible and not played with like a child's toy. Action figures are also oftentimes used for stop motion animation.

== History ==
=== Precursors ===
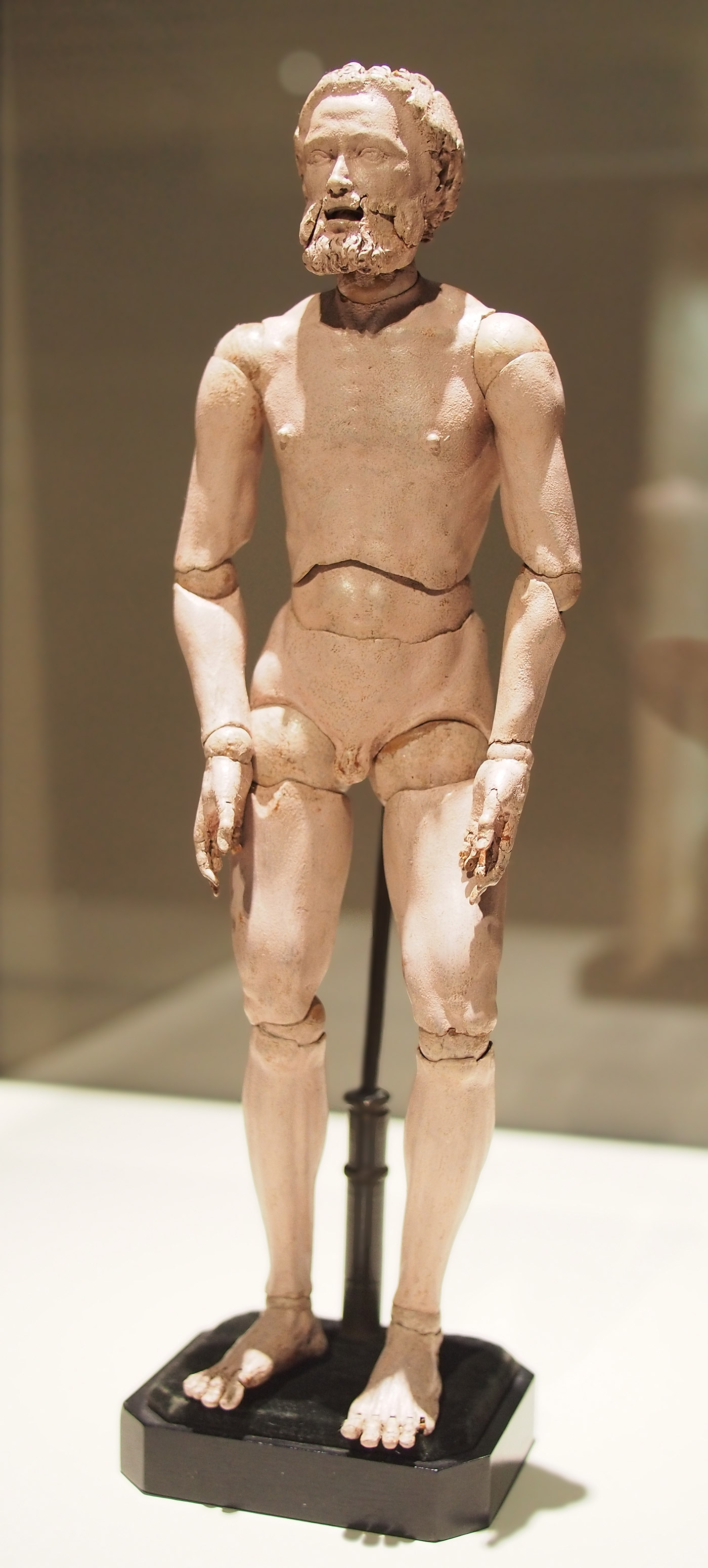
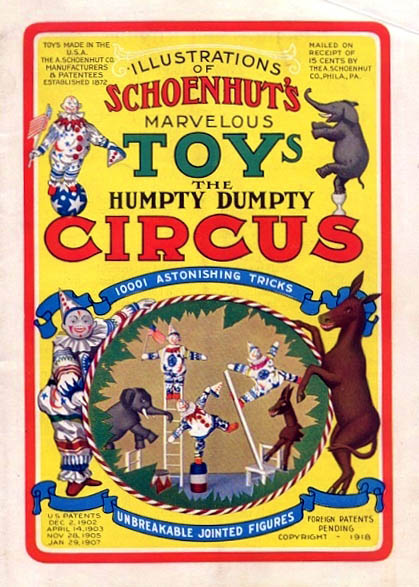
(Left): A clay mannequin created by Albrecht Dürer, circa 1525. (Right): advertisement for the Humpty Dumpty Circus set of 1904

Articulated dolls go back to at least 200 BCE, with articulated clay and wooden dolls of ancient Greece and Rome. Many types of articulated figures date to the early modern period, including the artists' mannequin and the Japanese ichimatsu doll. The modern ball-jointed doll was first created in Western Europe in the late 19th century. From the late 19th century through the early 20th century French and German manufacturers made bisque dolls with strung bodies articulated with ball-joints made of composition: a mix of pulp, sawdust, glue and similar materials. These dolls could measure between 15 and 100 cm (6 and 39.5 in) and are now collectible antiques.

Besides the articulated doll, another important precursor to the action figure is the toy soldier. Military figures have been found in ancient Egyptian tombs, and have appeared in many cultures and eras. Tin soldiers were produced in Germany as early as the 1730s, by molding the metal between two pieces of slate. As industry and demand advanced, so did production methods, with hollow casting first being utilized in the 1890s and polyethylene figures becoming common by the 1950s. The toy soldier market, ubiquitous thanks to its history and mass-production methods, would therefore become a natural home for the military-themed action figure.

One of the earliest toys to bear resemblance to modern action figures is Albert Schoenhut's "Humpty Dumpty Circus", released in 1904, which featured articulated wooden figures interacting with various devices.

=== 1960s–1970s ===
The term "action figure" was coined by Hasbro in 1964, to market their G.I. Joe figure to boys who refused to play with "dolls", a term primarily associated as a girl's toy. (A similar toy named Johnny Hero was introduced by Rosko Industries for Sears in 1965, but was known as a "Boy's Doll" since the term action figure had not gained widespread usage at that point.) G.I. Joe was initially a military-themed 11.5-inch figure proposed by marketing and toy idea-man Stan Weston. It featured changeable clothes with various uniforms to suit different purposes.

In a move that would create global popularity for this type of toy, Hasbro also licensed the product to companies in other markets. These different licensees had a combination of uniforms and accessories that were usually identical to the ones manufactured for the US market by Hasbro, along with some sets that were unique to the local market. The Japanese had at least two examples where a Hasbro licensee also issued sublicenses for related products. For example, UK based Palitoy issued a sublicense to Tsukuda, a company in Japan, to manufacture and sell Palitoy's Action Man accessories in the Japanese market. Takara also issued a sublicense to Medicom for the manufacture of action figures.

Takara, still under license by Hasbro to make and sell G.I. Joe toys in Japan, also manufactured an action figure incorporating the licensed GI Joe torso for Henshin Cyborg-1, using transparent plastic revealing cyborg innards, and a chrome head and cyborg feet. During the oil supply crisis of the 1970s, like many other manufacturers of action figures, Takara was struggling with the costs associated with making the large 11 1/2-inch figures, So, a smaller version of the cyborg toy was developed, standing at 3 3/4 inches (95 mm) high, and was first sold in 1974 as Microman. The Microman line was also novel in its use of interchangeable parts. This laid the foundation for both the smaller action figure size and the transforming robot toy. Takara began producing characters in the Microman line with increasingly robotic features, including Robotman, a 12-inch (300 mm) robot with room for a Microman pilot, and Mini-Robotman, a 3 3/4-inch (95 mm) version of Robotman. These toys also featured interchangeable parts, with emphasis placed on the transformation and combination of the characters.

In 1971, Mego began licensing and making American Marvel and DC comic book superhero figures, which had highly successful sales and are considered highly collectible by many adults today. They eventually brought the Microman toy line to the United States as the Micronauts, but Mego eventually lost control of the market after losing the license to produce Star Wars toys to Kenner in 1976. The widespread success of Kenner's Star Wars 3 3/4-inch (95 mm) toy line made the newer, smaller size figure with molded-on clothing the industry standard. Instead of a single character with outfits that changed for different applications, toy lines included teams of characters with special functions. Led by Star Wars-themed sales, collectible action figures quickly became a multimillion-dollar secondary business for movie studios.

From 1972 to 1986 there was a famous line of Big Jim action figures produced by Mattel.

=== 1980s–1990s ===
The 1980s spawned all sorts of popular action figure lines, many based on cartoon series, which were one of the largest marketing tools for toy companies. Some of the most successful to come about were Masters of the Universe, G.I. Joe, Thundercats, The Real Ghostbusters and Super Powers Collection, to name just a few. Early in the decade, the burgeoning popularity of Japanese robot anime such as Gundam also encouraged Takara to reinvent the Microman line as the Micro Robots, moving from the cyborg action figure concept to the concept of the living robot. This led to the Micro Change line of toys: objects that could "transform" into robots. In 1984, Hasbro licensed Micro Change and another Takara line, the Diaclone transforming cars, and combined them in the US as the Transformers, spawning a still-continuing family of animated cartoons.

As the '80s were ending, more and more collectors started to surface, buying up the toys to keep in their original packaging for display purposes and for future collectability. This led to flooding of the action figure toy market. One of the most popular action figure lines of the late 1980s and early 1990s, Teenage Mutant Ninja Turtles action figures were produced in such high quantities that the value for most figures would never be higher than a few dollars. In the mid-1990s, a new Star Wars figure line had surfaced and Spawn figures flooded the toy store shelves, proving action figures were not just for kids anymore. Corinthian Figures of association football players were popular in England during this time. Beginning in 1997, ToyFare magazine would become a popular read for mature collectors in providing news and embracing nostalgia with a comedic twist. And with the gaining popularity of the Internet, websites such as Toy News International would soon offer information on upcoming collectible figures and merchandise.

It was during this time that popular characters were increasingly getting specialized costume and variant figures. Batman quickly became most notorious for this (i.e. Arctic Batman, Piranha Blade Batman, Neon Armor Batman). Rather than individual characters, these variants would make up the bulk of many action figure lines and often make use of the old figure and accessory molds. Glow-in-the-dark figures and accessories also became popular in the early '90s with lines like Toxic Crusaders and Swamp Thing.

A 1999 study found that "the figures have grown much more muscular over time, with many contemporary figures far exceeding the muscularity of even the largest human bodybuilders" and that the changing cultural expectations reflected by those changes may contribute to body image disorders in both sexes.

=== 2000s onwards ===
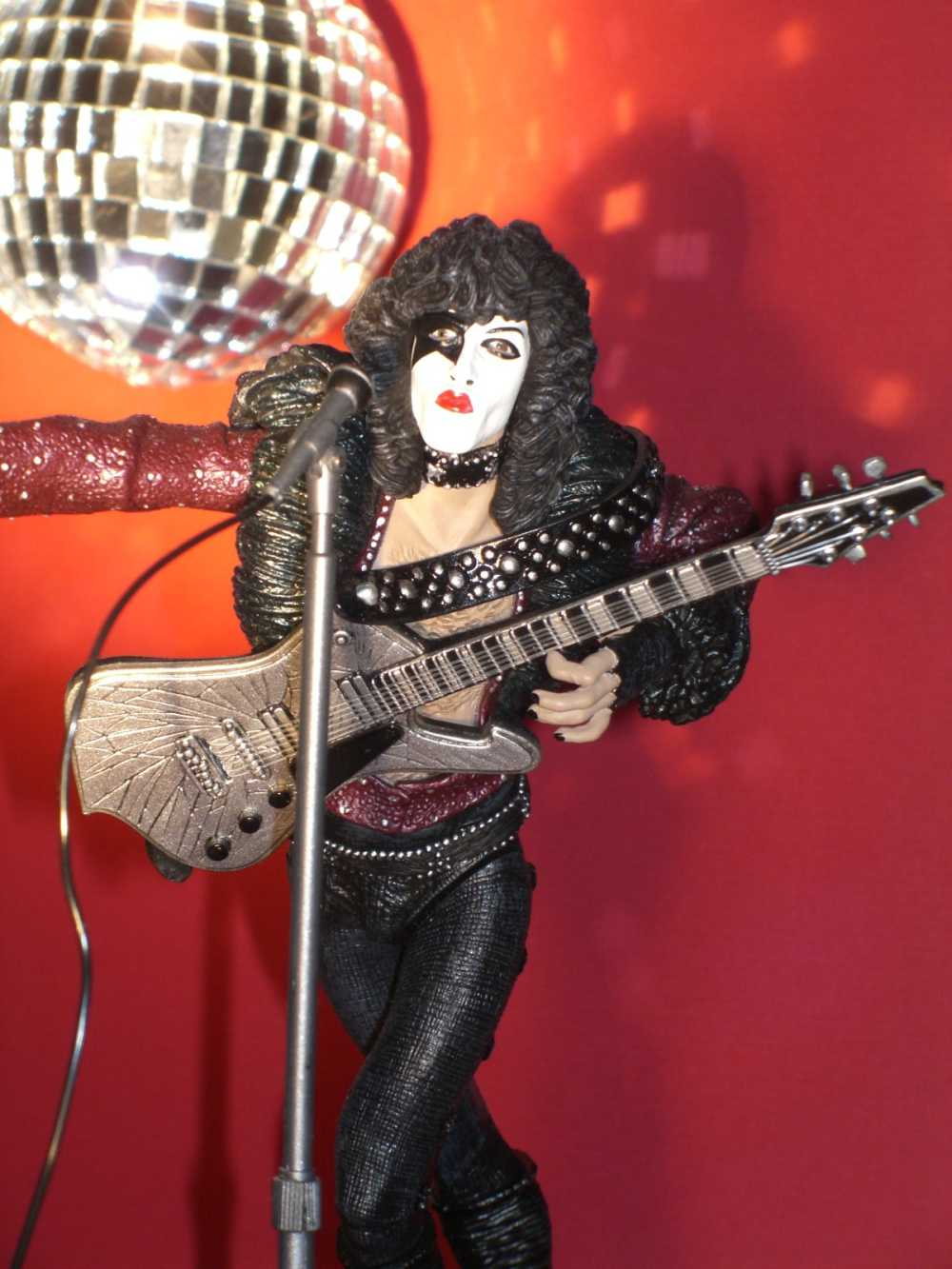
Paul Stanley action figure made by McFarlane Toys

The adult collector market for action figures expanded with companies such as McFarlane Toys, Palisades, and NECA. These companies have given numerous movie characters, musicians, and athletes their very first highly detailed figures. The Cinema of Fear action figures were sold together with plush dolls, "screen grab" dioramas, and limited edition toys based on New Line Cinema's horror franchise. These kinds of action figure are mainly intended as statuesque display pieces rather than toys. Child-oriented lines such as the Masters of the Universe revival and Justice League Unlimited, however, still evoke adult collector followings as well. Comic book firms are also able to get figures of their characters produced, regardless of whether or not they appeared in movies or animated cartoons. Examples of companies that produce comic figures and merchandise almost exclusively include Toy Biz and DC Direct.

Adult-oriented figure lines are often exclusive to specific chain stores rather than mass retail. Popular lines often have figures available exclusively through mail-in offers and comic conventions, which raises their value significantly. Ploys such as packaging "errors" and "short-packed" figures have also been used by toy companies to increase collector interest.

== Production ==
=== Raw materials ===
Modelling clay and various sculpting tools are used to create the prototype. The actual figure is molded from a harder plastic resin such as acrylonitrile butadiene styrene (ABS). Softer plastics and nylon may be used for costume components including body suits, capes, and face masks. Acrylic paints of various colors may be used to decorate the figure. More elaborate toys may contain miniature electronic components that provide light and sound effects.

=== Designs ===
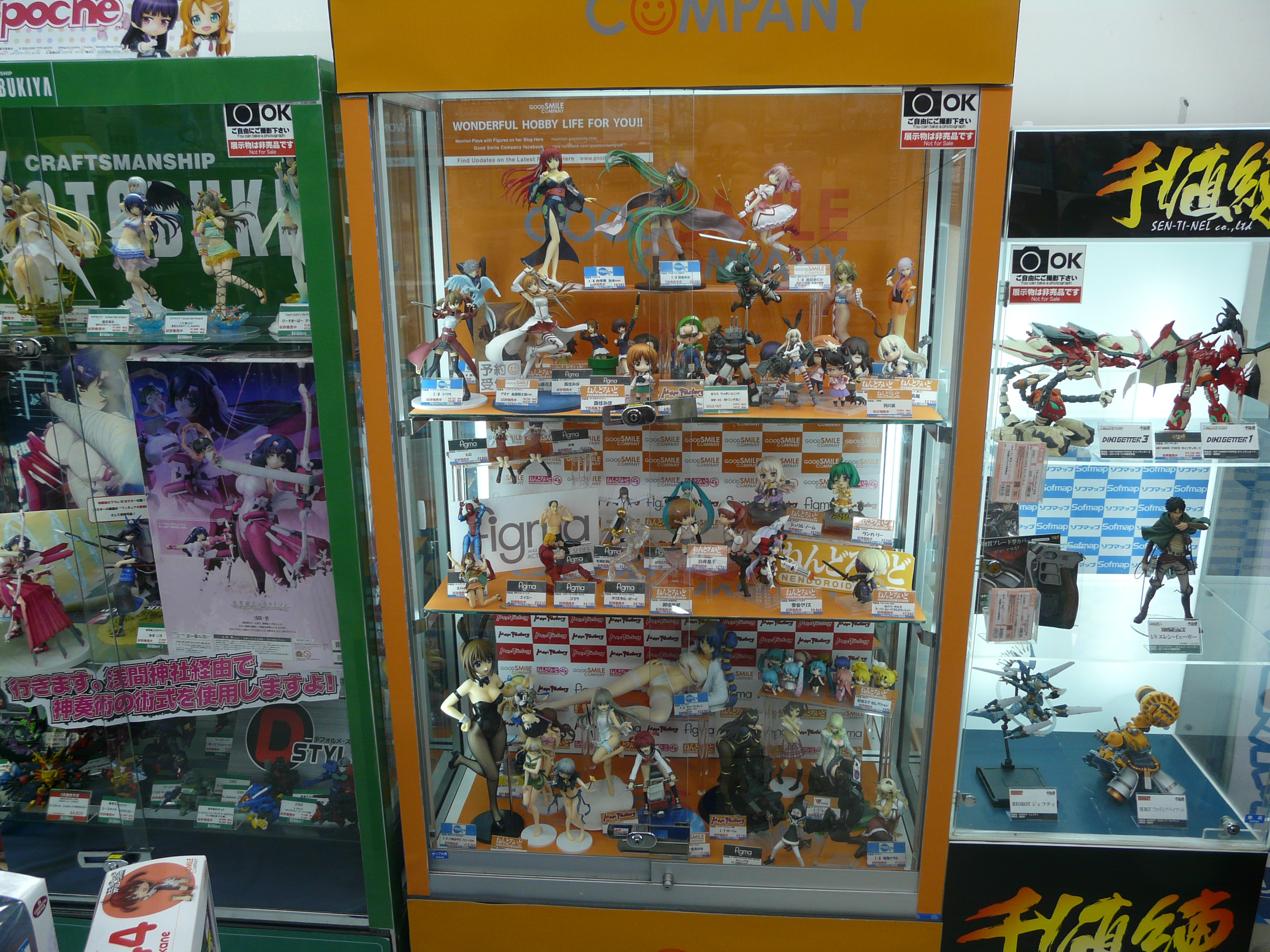
Display case in Japan featuring typical animanga action figures and figurines

Once the character has been selected, the actual design process begins with sketches of the proposed figure. The next step is the creation of a clay prototype, but other materials such as wax can also be used for the prototype. This model is made by bending aluminum wires to form the backbone of the figure, known as an armature. The wire form includes the outline of the arms and legs posed in the general stance that the figure will assume. The sculptor then adds clay to the armature to give the basic weight and shape that is desired. The clay may be baked slightly during the prototyping process to harden it. Then, the sculptor uses various tools, such as a wire loop, to carve the clay and shape details on the figure.

After creating the basic form, the sculptor may choose to remove the arms and work on them separately for later attachment. This gives the sculptor more control and allows him to produce finer details on the prototype. Working with blunt tools, the sculptor shapes the body with as much detail as is desired. During this process, photo and sketch references are used to ensure the figure is as realistic as possible. Some sculptors may even use human models to guide their design work.

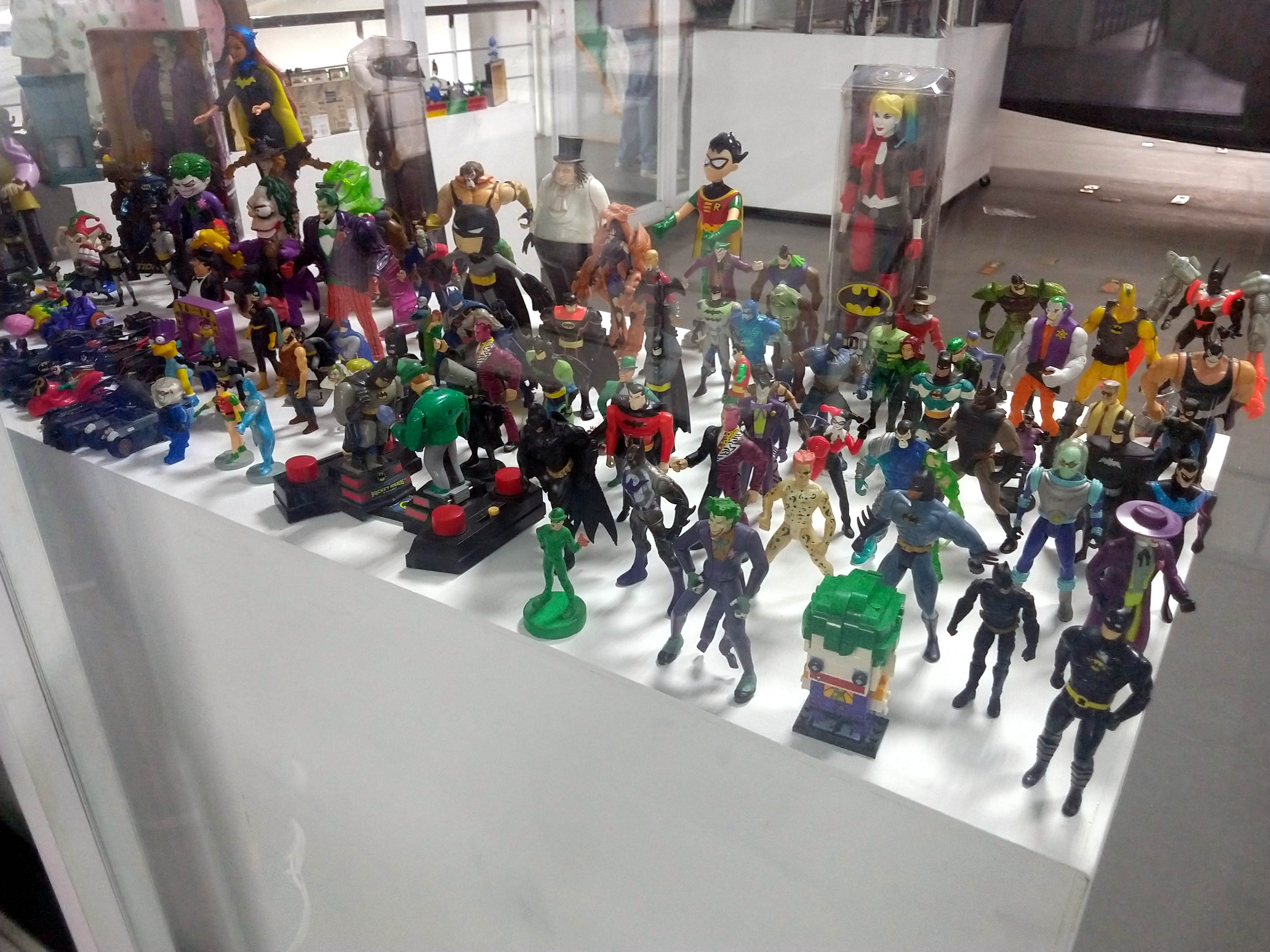
Several DC Comics superheroes action figures exhibited in Mexico City

After the general body shape is complete, the sculptor adds the finer details, paying close attention to the eyes, nose, and mouth that give the figure its lifelike expression. The designer may attach a rough lump of clay on the main figure as a temporary head while the real head is sculpted on a separate armature. This allows the sculptor to finish the figure's facial expressions independently of the body. At this point, the finished head can be attached to the main armature and joined to the body with additional clay. Once the head is attached, the neck and hair are sculpted to properly fit to the figure. Then, depending on the design of the figure, the costume may be sculpted directly onto the body. However, if a cloth costume or uniform will be added later, the prototype is sculpted without any costume details. During this process, parts of the clay may be covered with aluminum foil to keep it from prematurely drying out. Once everything is completed, the entire figure is baked to harden the clay.

The sculpted prototype is then sent for approval to the manufacturer. Once all design details have been finalized, the prototype is used to make the molds that will form the plastic pieces for the mass-produced figure. The entire sculpting process may take about two weeks, depending on the skill and speed of the sculptor. This process may be repeated several times if revisions must be made to the figure. Several months are typically allowed for this design phase.

== Characteristics and features ==
=== Scale ===
Action Figures come in fixed scales to allow compatibility within (and sometimes between) toy ranges.

Ratio	Inches per foot	Size	Examples
1:32	0.375" [9.5 mm]	2.125" [54 mm]	2.12-inch HASBRO Star Wars: Unleashed toy soldiers and Wm.Britain Ltd. plastic figures, farm animals and vehicles.
1:30	0.4" [10.16 mm]	2.36" [60 mm]	Used for detailed metal toy soldiers (King & Country, BlackHawk, Wm.Britain).
1:24	0.5" [12.7 mm]	2.5" [63.5 mm]	2.5-inch mini Action Figures (Hasbro's Playskool and Star Wars: Galactic Heroes). Also called 1/2-inch scale for children's dollhouses.
1:18	0.67" [16.93 mm]	3.75" [95.25 mm]	3.75-inch action figures (Kenner Star Wars, Hasbro G.I. Joe: A Real American Hero, Mattel Jurassic World). Also called 2/3-inch scale for children's dollhouses.
1:16	0.75" [19.05 mm]	4" [101.6 mm]	4-inch action figures. Also used for most plastic toy animal figures and Ertl's toy farm sets (animals, structures, and most vehicles). The Hasbro 3.75-inch G.I. Joe figures' vehicles are closer to this scale.
1:15	0.8" [20.32 mm]	5" [127 mm]	5-inch action figures (Kenner Jurassic Park, Bandai Power Rangers).
1:12	1" [25.40 mm]	6" [152.4 mm]	6-inch action figures (Toy Biz Marvel Legends, Hasbro Marvel Cinematic Universe, Playmates Teenage Mutant Ninja Turtles, and DC Direct Action Figures). Also used for "Classic scale" model horses and called 1-inch scale for dollhouses.
1:10	1.2" [30.48 mm]	7" [177.8 mm]	7-inch action figures (Mattel "classic scale" He Man and the Masters of the Universe, DC Universe and most NECA Figures).
1:9	1.33" [33.87 mm]	8" [203.2 mm]	8-inch action figures and dolls (Mego World's Greatest Super Heroes). Also used for "Traditional scale" model horses.
1:8	1.5" [38.1 mm]	9" [228.6 mm]	9-inch articulated action figures (Playmates 9" Star Trek line).
1:6	2" [50.80 mm]	12" [304.8 mm]	12-inch Articulated figures - Action Figures like Hasbro "classic scale" G.I. Joe, Dragon Models New Generation Life Action Figures, and Hot Toys Movie Masterpiece Series. Fashion dolls like Mattel's Barbie or Volks' Dollfie. Also used for static display figures (commonly of anime characters).
1:4	3" [76.20 mm]	18" [457 mm]	18-inch highly detailed larger action figures and fashion dolls.
1:3	4" [101.60 mm]	24" [609.6 mm]	24-inch highly articulated large ball-jointed fashion dolls (Volks Super Dollfie).

=== Articulation ===
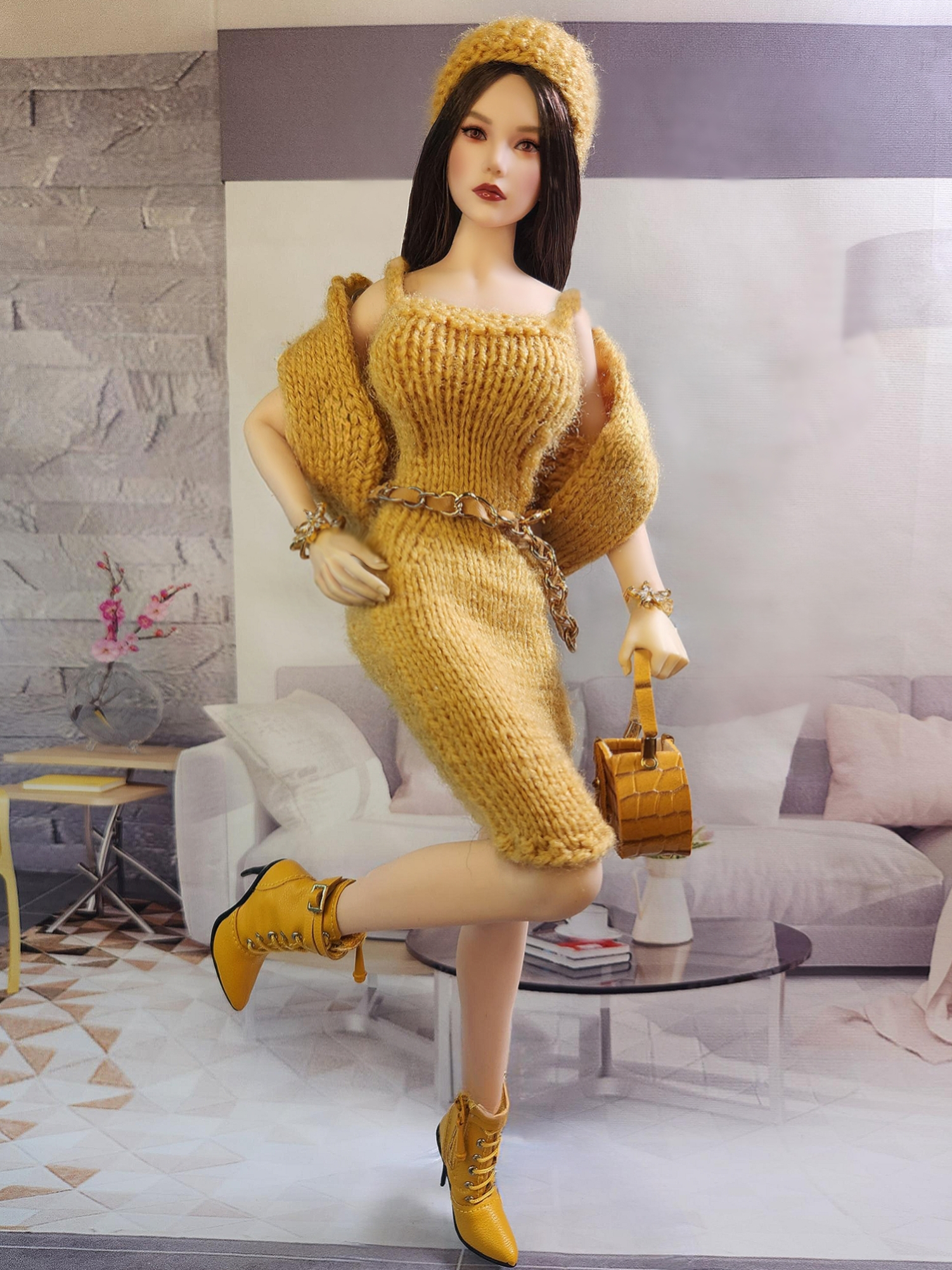
A fashion doll figure with articulated parts

A common feature among action figures is body articulation, often referred to as points of articulation (POA) or joints. The most basic forms of articulation include one neck joint, two shoulder joints, and two hip joints. Beyond these, rotating wrists, bending knees, and a swiveling waist are also common. Various terms have come into practice such as a "cut" joint, frequently used to allow a basic head rotation at the neck or arm rotation at the shoulder. The "T" joint at a figure's hips commonly allows up to 180° of front-to-back leg rotation; although, this may vary. Ball joints often allow more liberal movement than a cut, such as the figure's head being able to tilt in addition to a cut's strict vertical rotation. Basic knee articulation often relies on what is considered a pin joint.

The amount and style of figure articulation used by toy designers have varied over the years. Two of the most popular figure lines of the 1980s, G.I. Joe: A Real American Hero and Masters of the Universe, contrasted one another greatly in articulation; the former included several points in their small, 3 3/4-inch (95 mm) scale while the bulkier latter remained minimal. Both, however, used methods involving rubber cords at the hips that are little used today. In the 2000s, Toy Biz's popular Marvel Legends line became known for its high rate of articulation, even boasting points at the abdomen, toes, and fingers.

=== Accessories ===
While not all action figures include accessories, the additional items often prove essential to characters and their effectiveness as interactive toys. Typical 3 3/4-inch (95 mm) scale G.I. Joe figures include several intricately sculpted guns or hand weapons that can be fastened inside the figures' hands. Missile launchers are also commonplace in military and comic book figure lines and usually involve a spring-loaded mechanism. However, possibly due to safety concerns, this method saw a decline in the mid-1990s. Some figures, particularly of the Joker, have incorporated water-squirting weapons.

More recently, Marvel Legends has popularized the "build-a-figure" concept. Each figure of a particular series includes a body part to a larger-scaled figure. This encourages the consumer to purchase every figure of the given series, in order to complete the larger figure. The concept has spread into Mattel's DC Universe Classics. Figures intended to appeal to the collector market commonly include a display base and/or pack-in comic book. In such cases accessories may be designed more for display than play.

=== Types of packaging ===
Manufacturers have packaged their action figures in a number of ways.

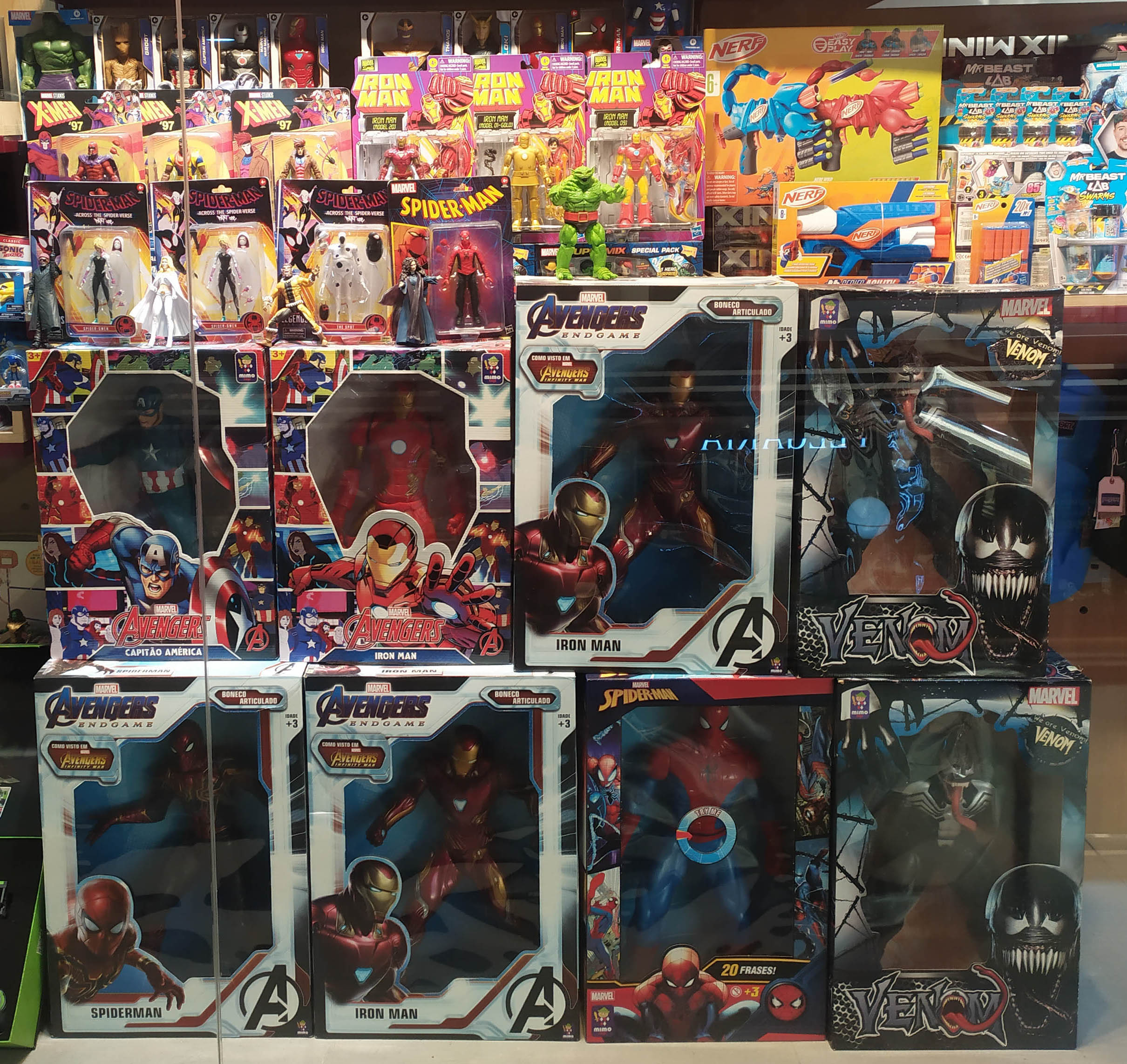
Several action figures exhibited with their packaging

Window Box packaging Window box packages consist of a sturdy, but somewhat thin cardboard box that allows for easy stacking. The box has colorful artwork to draw one's attention. The front of the box will have an area of the cardboard that is cut out and a thin piece of soft plastic then fills the cutout area. This ensures easy visibility of the action figure inside of the box. This type of packaging was used by companies such as Mego Corporation in the early 1970s until they switched to the Carded Bubble style of packaging in the mid to late 1970s. Window Box packaging is still used today, often for figures that measure 10" or taller in height.

Carded Bubble packaging This type of packaging consists of a sturdy piece of thin cardboard backing known as a "Card." The card is decorated with colorful artwork to draw consumer attention. The action figure is placed on the card and a bubble of clear plastic is then laid over the top of the action figure and attached to the card. The figure is then clearly visible to consumers. Often the bubble will have several small, fitted compartments to hold the figure and its accessories in place. Kenner and Hasbro's packaging of Star Wars action figures since 1977 are an example.

PVC packaging A more recent type of packaging that is common as of the 2000s decade is PVC packaging. With this type of packaging, the cardboard card is replaced by a clear PVC plastic backing. The front of the package is a different piece of PVC plastic that is molded to include a bubble that will house the action figure and all of its accessories. Any colorful artwork designed to help draw attention to the package will be printed on a thin piece of paper that is placed between these two pieces of PVC, or will be affixed in sticker form to the front piece of PVC. This type of packaging is popular today and can be seen being used by McFarlane Toys for their Movie Maniacs line of action figures beginning with Series V. Other companies that utilize this type of packaging are NECA/Reel Toys (National Entertainment Collectibles Association) with their Cult Classics and Pirates of the Caribbean line of figures, and Toy Biz with its Marvel Legends action figures, which included a comic book placed between the two PVC segments.

Tube packaging Another recent type of PVC packaging is a tube-shaped piece of PVC plastic surrounding the action figure. The tube may be cylindrical or oval in shape. Artwork on the package is often in the form of a sticker affixed to the outside of the PVC tube. This type of packaging has been used by Hasbro for their Star Wars Galactic Heroes line of figures.

=== Action features ===
Figures of the original Masters of the Universe line included many unique "action features": Battle Armor He-Man and Skeletor had rotating chest plates to represent varying degrees of damage; Leech featured suction cup limbs; Mantenna's eyes would pop out using a lever on his back; and Thunder Punch He-Man would thrust a punch and emit a loud bang from the ring cap in his backpack. Other features emphasized aesthetic rather than action, such as the flocked bodies of Grizzlor and Moss Man as well as the unique scents of the latter and Stinkor.

The success of the many Transformers lines has relied heavily on their signature feature of shifting from vehicle to robot. The popularity of this carried into Teenage Mutant Ninja Turtles' Mutatin' series among others.

In 1987, Mattel introduced figures for the television series Captain Power and the Soldiers of the Future. The line boasted an interactive game where children could shoot at the TV screen. However, while an ambitious concept, it was not a long-term success.

Glow-in-the-dark paint and plastic have been utilized in various figure collections, particularly those of the early '90s including Ninja Turtles, Swamp Thing, and Toxic Crusaders. Similarly, a color-changing feature has been demonstrated on some figures throughout the years. This concept involves dipping the character's head into cold water and revealing a temperature-sensitive paint. Examples include Kenner's Sky Escape Joker and Camouflage Swamp Thing, as well as Hasbro's Desert-Camo Sgt. Savage.

The majority of figures in Kenner's Super Powers Collection toted a punching action upon the squeezing together of their legs. In a more technically advanced method, the Ninja Turtles' Wacky Action series involved a wind-up gear that caused the motorized performance of certain actions like swimming legs or a rotating wrist. Two years prior also saw the release of Tyco's Dino-Riders, which featured battery powered, motorized dinosaurs.

== See also ==
- Toy Biz v. United States (2003), which determined that action figures of certain superheroes are legally toys, not dolls
- Celebrity doll
- Fashion doll
- Figma, a line of highly articulated action figures produced by Max Factory
- Stuffed toy
- Bobblehead
