= Johnny Hero (figure) =

Sports action figure

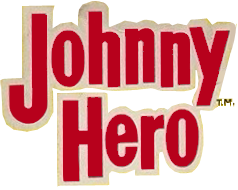
- Product type: Sports figurine of football and baseball player
- Country: United States
- Introduced: 1965
- Discontinued: 1965; 61 years ago
- Previous owners: Rosko Industries

Johnny Hero is the brand for a clothed, 13-inch (330 mm) tall figurine produced by Rosko Industries for Sears as a boy's doll (the term "action figure" had only begun being used with Hasbro's G.I. Joe in 1964).

Johnny Hero was basically a sports figurine that could be fitted with various team uniforms (sold separately). The toy was introduced for the 1965 holiday season. At some point Johnny Hero was repackaged as Olympic Hero.

Johnny Hero could be found packaged in a similar long box as GI Joe with minimal graphics and text describing the figure. Johnny's outfit included a red long-sleeve jogging suit (the top had "Johnny Hero" and the number "16" printed on the front); gold shorts, white socks and white tennis shoes. The body was made of heavy foam, with a plastic head and hands. His right hand projected a metal rod or prong to help hold sports balls and equipment.

Several sports team uniforms were made available, including the Washington Redskins and other NFL or AFL teams. Uniforms included plastic helmets and were sewn/printed in team colors.
