= Edward L. Hedden =

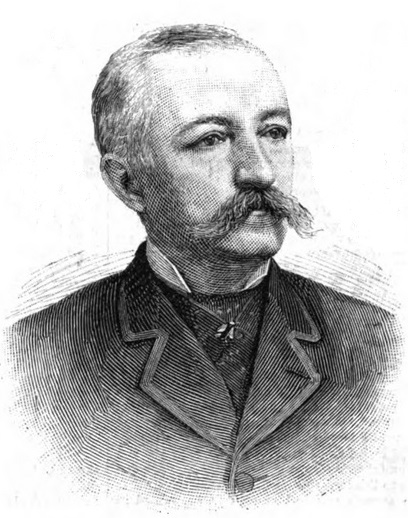
From Leslie's Illustrated, July 1, 1885

Edward Long Hedden (December 24, 1828 – February 6, 1893) was Collector of the Port of New York from 1885 to 1886.

== Early life ==
Hedden was born in 1828, in New York City, New York, to Josiah Hedden (who had studied law under Alexander Hamilton) and Elizabeth June Hedden.

In 1855, he married Elizabeth Caroline Apgar.

== Career ==
From 1859 to 1884, Hedden worked for the shipping firm of Wetmore, Cryer, and Co. He was also a director of the North River Bank and of the Niagara Insurance Company.

Hedden was appointed Collector of the Port by Grover Cleveland on June 27, 1885. The appointment was made largely due to the influence of Hubert O. Thompson, the Commissioner of Public Works of the City of New York and local Democratic leader, as Hedden's son-in-law, Charles Campbell Worthington, was a contractor for the Department of Public Works. Other candidates for the post included J. Edward Simmons, president of the New York Stock Exchange, who was supported by Samuel Tilden, and J. J. O'Donohue, a member of Tammany Hall.

Hedden ran into controversy when he removed George B. Bacon, a Republican appointee, from his post as chief weigher of the Brooklyn Customs House and replaced him with George H. Sterling, without administering a civil service exam, as this was not required by law. The decision was attacked by civil service reformers, who believed the appointment was politically motivated and that Sterling was incompetent, although Hedden defended his choice. Eventually, President Cleveland demanded a competitive examination and Sterling lost the post. On August 7, 1886, Hedden resigned his post and was replaced by Daniel Magone.

In 1887, Hedden was named as the defendant in the case Nix v. Hedden, in which fruit importer John Nix sued Hedden to recover duties Nix believed were unnecessary. Nix wished to exempt his tomato imports from a vegetable tariff included in the Tariff of 1883, as tomatoes are botanically considered fruit. In 1893, the Supreme Court ruled against Nix, stating that tomatoes were generally considered vegetables and thus should be taxed as such.

Government offices
Preceded by William H. Robertson	Collector of the Port of New York; 1885–1886	Succeeded by Daniel Magone
