= Judge Rao =

Judge Rao may refer to:

- Neomi Rao (born 1973), judge of the United States Court of Appeals for the District of Columbia Circuit
- Paul Peter Rao (1899–1988), judge of the United States Court of International Trade
