= George Weller (disambiguation) =

George Weller (1907–2002) was an American novelist, playwright, and Pulitzer Prize-winning journalist.

George Weller may also refer to:

- George Weller (1805–1875), a member of the Weller brothers of New Zealand
- George Emery Weller (1857–1932), American judge
- George Weller, driver in the 2003 Santa Monica Farmers Market crash
