= List of United States Supreme Court cases, volume 149 =

Supreme Court of the United States
- Interactive map of Supreme Court of the United States
- 38°53′26″N 77°00′16″W
- Established: March 4, 1789; 236 years ago
- Location: Washington, D.C.
- Coordinates: 38°53′26″N 77°00′16″W
- Composition method: Presidential nomination with Senate confirmation
- Authorised by: Constitution of the United States, Art. III, § 1
- Judge term length: life tenure, subject to impeachment and removal
- Number of positions: 9 (by statute)
- Website: supremecourt.gov

This is a list of cases reported in volume 149 of United States Reports, decided by the Supreme Court of the United States in 1893.

== Justices of the Supreme Court at the time of volume 149 U.S. ==
The Supreme Court is established by Article III, Section 1 of the Constitution of the United States, which says: "The judicial Power of the United States, shall be vested in one supreme Court . . .". The size of the Court is not specified; the Constitution leaves it to Congress to set the number of justices. Under the Judiciary Act of 1789 Congress originally fixed the number of justices at six (one chief justice and five associate justices). Since 1789 Congress has varied the size of the Court from six to seven, nine, ten, and back to nine justices (always including one chief justice).

When the cases in volume 149 U.S. were decided the Court comprised the following nine members:

Portrait	Justice	Office	Home State	Succeeded	Date confirmed by the Senate (Vote)	Tenure on Supreme Court
	Melville Fuller	Chief Justice	Illinois	Morrison Waite	July 20, 1888 (41–20)	October 8, 1888 – July 4, 1910 (Died)
	Stephen Johnson Field	Associate Justice	California	newly created seat	March 10, 1863 (Acclamation)	May 10, 1863 – December 1, 1897 (Retired)
	John Marshall Harlan	Associate Justice	Kentucky	David Davis	November 29, 1877 (Acclamation)	December 10, 1877 – October 14, 1911 (Died)
	Horace Gray	Associate Justice	Massachusetts	Nathan Clifford	December 20, 1881 (51–5)	January 9, 1882 – September 15, 1902 (Died)
	Samuel Blatchford	Associate Justice	New York	Ward Hunt	March 22, 1882 (Acclamation)	April 3, 1882 – July 7, 1893 (Died)
	David Josiah Brewer	Associate Justice	Kansas	Stanley Matthews	December 18, 1889 (53–11)	January 6, 1890 – March 28, 1910 (Died)
	Henry Billings Brown	Associate Justice	Michigan	Samuel Freeman Miller	December 29, 1890 (Acclamation)	January 5, 1891 – May 28, 1906 (Retired)
	George Shiras Jr.	Associate Justice	Pennsylvania	Joseph P. Bradley	July 26, 1892 (Acclamation)	October 10, 1892 – February 23, 1903 (Retired)
	Howell Edmunds Jackson	Associate Justice	Tennessee	Lucius Quintus Cincinnatus Lamar	February 18, 1893 (Acclamation)	March 4, 1893 – August 8, 1895 (Died)

== Notable Cases in 149 U.S. ==
=== Nix v. Hedden ===
In Nix v. Hedden, 149 U.S. 304 (1893), the Supreme Court held that under U.S. customs regulations, a tomato should be classified as a vegetable rather than a fruit; the Tariff Act of 1883 used the ordinary meaning of the words "fruit" and "vegetable," instead of the technical botanical meaning.

=== Fong Yue Ting v. United States ===
Fong Yue Ting v. United States, |149 U.S. 698 (1893), is a decision challenging provisions in Section 6 of the Geary Act of 1892 that extended and amended the Chinese Exclusion Act of 1882. The provisions in question required Chinese in the United States to obtain certificates of residency, and allowed for the arrest and deportation of Chinese who had failed to obtain these certificates, even if they had not violated any other laws. The case involved writs of habeas corpus from Fong Yue Ting and two other Chinese citizens residing in New York City who were arrested and detained for not having certificates. The Supreme Court decided in favor of the United States government, upholding the Geary Act and denying the writs of habeas corpus.

== Citation style ==
Under the Judiciary Act of 1789 the federal court structure at the time comprised District Courts, which had general trial jurisdiction; Circuit Courts, which had mixed trial and appellate (from the US District Courts) jurisdiction; and the United States Supreme Court, which had appellate jurisdiction over the federal District and Circuit courts—and for certain issues over state courts. The Supreme Court also had limited original jurisdiction (i.e., in which cases could be filed directly with the Supreme Court without first having been heard by a lower federal or state court). There were one or more federal District Courts and/or Circuit Courts in each state, territory, or other geographical region.

The Judiciary Act of 1891 created the United States Courts of Appeals and reassigned the jurisdiction of most routine appeals from the district and circuit courts to these appellate courts. The Act created nine new courts that were originally known as the "United States Circuit Courts of Appeals." The new courts had jurisdiction over most appeals of lower court decisions. The Supreme Court could review either legal issues that a court of appeals certified or decisions of court of appeals by writ of certiorari.

Bluebook citation style is used for case names, citations, and jurisdictions.

- "# Cir." = United States Court of Appeals
  - e.g., "3d Cir." = United States Court of Appeals for the Third Circuit
- "C.C.D." = United States Circuit Court for the District of . . .
  - e.g.,"C.C.D.N.J." = United States Circuit Court for the District of New Jersey
- "D." = United States District Court for the District of . . .
  - e.g.,"D. Mass." = United States District Court for the District of Massachusetts
- "E." = Eastern; "M." = Middle; "N." = Northern; "S." = Southern; "W." = Western
  - e.g.,"C.C.S.D.N.Y." = United States Circuit Court for the Southern District of New York
  - e.g.,"M.D. Ala." = United States District Court for the Middle District of Alabama
- "Ct. Cl." = United States Court of Claims
- The abbreviation of a state's name alone indicates the highest appellate court in that state's judiciary at the time.
  - e.g.,"Pa." = Supreme Court of Pennsylvania
  - e.g.,"Me." = Supreme Judicial Court of Maine

== List of cases in volume 149 U.S. ==
Case Name	Page and year	Opinion of the Court	Concurring opinion(s)	Dissenting opinion(s)	Lower Court	Disposition
Chicago, Milwaukee and St. Paul Railway Company v. Hoyt	1 (1893)	Jackson	none	none	C.C.N.D. Ill.	reversed
Bogk v. Gassert	17 (1893)	Brown	none	none	Sup. Ct. Terr. Mont.	affirmed
Paulsen v. City of Portland	30 (1893)	Brewer	none	none	Or.	affirmed
Richmond and Danville Railroad Company v. Powers	43 (1893)	Brewer	none	none	C.C.N.D. Ga.	affirmed
National Meter Company v. City of Yonkers	48 (1893)	Blatchford	none	none	C.C.S.D.N.Y.	affirmed
Wilson v. United States	60 (1893)	Field	none	none	C.C.N.D. Ill.	reversed
In re Frederich	70 (1893)	Jackson	none	none	C.C.D. Wash.	affirmed
Chandler v. Calumet and Hecla Mining Company	79 (1893)	Jackson	none	none	C.C.W.D. Mich.	affirmed
Thomas v. Western Car Company	95 (1893)	Shiras	none	none	C.C.N.D. Ill.	reversed
Dobson v. Cubley	117 (1893)	Shiras	none	none	C.C.S.D.N.Y.	affirmed
City of Cairo v. Zane	122 (1893)	Brewer	none	none	C.C.S.D. Ill.	affirmed
The Servia	144 (1893)	Blatchford	none	none	C.C.S.D.N.Y.	affirmed
Northern Pacific Railroad Company v. Whalen	157 (1893)	Gray	none	none	Sup. Ct. Terr. Wash.	affirmed
In re Tyler	164 (1893)	Fuller	none	none	not indicated	habeas corpus denied
In re Riser	191 (1893)	Fuller	none	none	not indicated	habeas corpus denied
Ex parte Humes	192 (1893)	Fuller	none	none	C.C.N.D. Ala.	mandamus denied
Mexican Central Railway Company v. Pinkney	194 (1893)	Jackson	none	none	C.C.W.D. Tex.	reversed
United States v. Snyder	210 (1893)	Shiras	none	none	C.C.E.D. La.	reversed
Duer v. Corbin Cabinet Lock Company	216 (1893)	Brown	none	none	C.C.D. Conn.	affirmed
Underwood v. Gerber	224 (1893)	Blatchford	none	none	C.C.E.D.N.Y.	affirmed
Pearsall v. Smith	231 (1893)	Blatchford	none	none	C.C.E.D.N.Y.	affirmed
Texas and Pacific Railway Company v. Anderson	237 (1893)	Fuller	none	none	5th Cir.	certification
Hager v. Swayne	242 (1893)	Fuller	none	none	C.C.N.D. Cal.	reversed
Shaeffer v. Blair	248 (1893)	Gray	none	none	C.C.W.D. Mo.	reversed
Cincinnati, Hamilton and Dayton Railroad Company v. McKeen	259 (1893)	Fuller	none	none	7th Cir.	dismissed
Abadie v. United States	261 (1893)	Fuller	none	none	C.C.N.D. Cal.	dismissed
United States v. Jones	262 (1893)	Fuller	none	none	C.C.W.D. La.	affirmed
Nash v. Harshman	263 (1893)	Fuller	none	none	C.C.N.D. Ohio	dismissed
Interstate Commerce Commission v. Atchison, Topeka and Santa Fe Railway Company	264 (1893)	Fuller	none	none	C.C.S.D. Cal.	dismissed
Richmond and Danville Railroad Company v. Elliott	266 (1893)	Brewer	none	none	C.C.N.D. Ga.	reversed
United States v. Mock	273 (1893)	Brewer	none	none	C.C.N.D. Cal.	reversed
United States v. Humphries	277 (1893)	Brewer	none	none	C.C.N.D. Cal.	reversed
United States v. Dumas	278 (1893)	Jackson	none	none	C.C.E.D. La.	affirmed
Leggett v. Standard Oil Company	287 (1893)	Jackson	none	none	C.C.S.D.N.Y.	affirmed
Moses v. Lawrence County Bank	298 (1893)	Gray	none	none	C.C.M.D. Ala.	reversed
Nix v. Hedden	304 (1893)	Gray	none	none	C.C.S.D.N.Y.	affirmed
California v. San Pablo and Tulare Railroad Company	308 (1893)	Gray	none	none	C.C.N.D. Cal.	dismissed
Dalzell v. Dueber Watch Case Manufacturing Company	315 (1893)	Gray	none	none	C.C.S.D.N.Y.	reversed
Wade v. Chicago, Springfield, and St. Louis Railroad Company	327 (1893)	Jackson	none	none	C.C.S.D. Ill.	reversed
Hedden v. Richard	346 (1893)	Shiras	none	none	C.C.S.D.N.Y.	reversed
Cadwalader v. Jessup and Moore Paper Company	350 (1893)	Blatchford	none	none	C.C.E.D. Pa.	affirmed
Hobbie v. Jennison	355 (1893)	Blatchford	none	none	C.C.E.D. Mich.	affirmed
Minneapolis and St. Louis Railway Company v. Emmons	364 (1893)	Field	none	none	Minn.	affirmed
Baltimore and Ohio Railroad Company v. Baugh	368 (1893)	Brewer	none	Field; Fuller	C.C.S.D. Ohio	reversed
Minneapolis and St. Louis Railway Company v. Nelson	368 (1893)	Field	none	none	C.C.S.D. Ohio	affirmed
Patrick v. Bowman	411 (1893)	Brown	none	Brewer	C.C.E.D. Mo.	reversed
Metropolitan National Bank v. St Louis Dispatch Company	436 (1893)	Fuller	none	none	C.C.E.D. Mo.	affirmed
Cates v. Allen	451 (1893)	Fuller	none	Brown	N.D. Miss.	reversed
City of St. Louis v. Western Union Telegraph Company	465 (1893)	Brewer	none	none	C.C.E.D. Mo.	rehearing denied
Porter v. Sabin	473 (1893)	Gray	none	none	C.C.D. Minn.	affirmed
Bibb v. Allen	481 (1893)	Jackson	none	none	C.C.M.D. Ala.	affirmed
Pickett v. Foster	505 (1893)	Shiras	none	none	C.C.W.D. La.	affirmed
Cadwalader v. Wanamaker	532 (1893)	Shiras	none	none	C.C.E.D. Pa.	affirmed
Walker v. Seeberger	541 (1893)	Shiras	none	none	C.C.N.D. Ill.	reversed
Hartranft v. Meyer	544 (1893)	Shiras	none	Brewer	C.C.E.D. Pa.	affirmed
Ide v. Ball Engine Company	550 (1893)	Brown	none	none	C.C.N.D. Ill.	affirmed
Brigham v. Coffin	557 (1893)	Brown	none	none	C.C.D. Mass.	affirmed
Coats v. Merrick Thread Company	562 (1893)	Brown	none	none	C.C.S.D.N.Y.	affirmed
When similarities between marks are due to design constraints or have been tolerated within the industry, there is no infringement if defendant's other packaging and advertising sufficiently distinguishes the products.
Sheffield Furnace Company v. Witherow	574 (1893)	Brewer	none	none	C.C.N.D. Ala.	affirmed
Loeber v. Schroeder	580 (1893)	Jackson	none	none	Md.	dismissed
Hollender v. Magone	586 (1893)	Brewer	none	none	C.C.S.D.N.Y.	reversed
Hill v. United States	593 (1893)	Gray	none	Shiras	C.C.D. Md.	reversed
Evans v. Stettnisch	605 (1893)	Brewer	none	none	C.C.D. Neb.	affirmed
Byers v. McAuley	608 (1893)	Brewer	none	Shiras	C.C.W.D. Pa.	reversed
McComb v. Frink	629 (1893)	Brewer	none	none	C.C.D. Del.	affirmed
McNulty v. California	645 (1893)	Fuller	none	none	Cal.	dismissed
Vincent v. California	648 (1893)	Fuller	none	none	Cal.	dismissed
Shute v. Keyser	649 (1893)	Fuller	none	none	Sup. Ct. Terr. Ariz.	dismissal denied
Carr v. Quigley	652 (1893)	Field	none	none	Cal.	reversed
Curtner v. United States	662 (1893)	Fuller	none	Field	C.C.N.D. Cal.	reversed
Union Pacific Railroad Company v. Goodridge	680 (1893)	Brown	none	none	C.C.D. Colo.	affirmed
Fong Yue Ting v. United States	698 (1893)	Gray	none	Brewer; Field; Fuller	C.C.S.D.N.Y.	affirmed
