= Gramm–Latta Budget =

The Gramm-Latta Budget (aka Gramm–Latta Bill) 1981 and the Gramm–Latta Omnibus Reconciliation Bill of 1981, sponsored by Representatives Phil Gramm (a Democrat, later Republican, from Texas) and Delbert Latta (a Republican from Ohio), implemented President Ronald Reagan's economic program. This included an increase in military spending and major cuts in discretionary and entitlement spending. The law also mandated the controversial 1981 Kemp–Roth Tax Cut.

In a 2001 press conference to announce his retirement, Gramm had this to say about the bill:

I wrote the first Reagan budget – the Gramm–Latta budget that rebuilt national defense and that laid the foundation for a program of peace through strength; the Reagan program that tore down the Berlin Wall, that liberated Eastern Europe, that transformed the Soviet Union and that changed the world.

== See also ==
- Ketchup as a vegetable
