= Ketchup as a vegetable =

1981 American political controversy

An illustration depicting ketchup as a vegetable in school lunches.

The ketchup as a vegetable controversy arose in September 1981, early in the presidency of Ronald Reagan, over school lunch regulations proposed by the USDA's Food and Nutrition Service (FNS). The proposal was intended to give local school lunch administrators more flexibility in meal planning after the Omnibus Reconciliation Act of 1980 and the Omnibus Budget Reconciliation Act of 1981 cut funding for the National School Lunch Program. It reduced minimum portion sizes and let states credit food items not explicitly listed toward nutritional requirements, giving pickle relish as an example of a condiment that could count as a vegetable. Ketchup was not mentioned in the regulations, but critics in Congress and the press treated it as the symbol of the proposal.

The administration withdrew the proposed regulations on September 25, 1981, in part because of the criticism. The announcement came from Budget Director David Stockman, who said the order was his. The FNS submitted revised proposals on November 17 that removed all mention of condiments counting as vegetables, and FNS Administrator G. William Hoagland was removed from his post later that month.

A similar controversy arose in 2011, when Congress passed a bill prohibiting the USDA from increasing the amount of tomato paste required to constitute a vegetable; the bill allowed pizza with two tablespoons (30 mL) of tomato paste to qualify as a vegetable.

== Background ==
The National School Lunch Act of 1946 established the National School Lunch Program, under which participating schools served free or reduced-cost lunches that had to meet minimum nutrition requirements set by the Secretary of Agriculture. Although no formal rule required it, school lunches had come to be expected to provide about one third of a child's daily Recommended Dietary Allowances (RDA). The Child Nutrition Act of 1966 expanded the program and centralized its administration in the US Department of Agriculture.

The Omnibus Reconciliation Act of 1980, signed into law by President Jimmy Carter, cut the federal school lunch and child nutrition budget by eight percent. The Omnibus Budget Reconciliation Act of 1981, passed as the Gramm–Latta Budget, cut the 1982 budget for the school lunch program by a further 25 percent. For a family of four, it lowered the income limit for a free lunch from $11,520 to $10,990 and for a reduced-price lunch from $17,560 to $15,630, and reduced federal subsidies by 11 cents on full-price meals, 23 cents on reduced-price meals, and three cents on free meals. The price of a reduced-price meal doubled to 40 cents.

By November 1981, the lunch program had lost 400 school food services and 2.1 million students, according to the USDA. Some districts saw large shares of students bringing their own lunch rather than paying the higher prices. In Clark County, Nevada, a 30 percent price increase was followed by a 46 percent fall in high school participation.

Section 818 of the 1981 act required the Secretary of Agriculture to review the program's nutritional requirements and "exhaust all alternatives for lowering local program costs". The act did not require meals to deliver one third of RDA.

== Proposed regulations ==
The FNS was tasked with implementing the cuts while maintaining nutritional requirements for school lunches despite the lower funding. The 1981 act required final regulations by November 11, 1981, 90 days after it was signed into law. At the time, over 26 million children in 94,000 schools took part in the National School Lunch Program; 38 percent received free meals, 7 percent received reduced-price meals, and 55 percent paid full price.

FNS staff interviewed local school lunch administrators around the country about ways to cut costs. Testifying before the House Subcommittee on Elementary, Secondary, and Vocational Education on September 17, 1981, FNS Administrator G. William Hoagland said administrators were frustrated by strict rules on what they could serve: "This is not a homogeneous nation. It is a compendium of likes and tastes." He said the proposal reflected what local school districts had asked for.

The proposal, published in the Federal Register on September 4, 1981, had three aims: to simplify administration of the lunch, breakfast and child care food programs, to reduce required portion sizes, and to revise how foods were counted toward nutrition goals. The administrative changes cut record-keeping and reporting requirements and replaced five age-based meal patterns with three: preschool, elementary and secondary.

=== Meal crediting ===
Lunches still had to include meat, milk, bread, and two vegetables or fruits, but more foods could count toward each. Nuts, seeds and their butters could replace half of the meat requirement, and yogurt, tofu, dry beans, peas and eggs could count as meat alternates. Any food made with enriched or whole-grain flour, such as pasta, crackers or pretzels, could count as bread, as could rice and rolled oats. Schools could serve any type of milk, or yogurt in its place.

State agencies could also credit foods the proposal did not list, provided they reported them to the FNS and met the crediting requirements. As an illustration, the proposal said a state could not count bread that was not enriched or whole-grain as bread, "but could credit a condiment such as pickle relish as a vegetable". Ketchup was not mentioned.

=== Portion sizes ===
The FNS argued that administrative savings and wider food choices would not save enough, and proposed lowering the minimum quantities a school had to serve to receive federal reimbursement; schools could still serve more. High school students offered all five items could take only three. The meat requirement for fourth to sixth graders fell from two ounces to 1.5 ounces, a vegetable or fruit serving from three-quarters of a cup to half a cup, and bread from eight servings a week to one a day. Milk fell from six ounces to four for preschool children and from eight to six for elementary students.

Hoagland told the subcommittee that the smaller meals would "continue to be excellent nutrient sources". He said caloric intake would fall from 21 percent to 17 percent, while protein and niacin would still meet half of the RDA and vitamin A, riboflavin, vitamin B-12, calcium and vitamin C would meet or exceed one third.

== Reaction ==
The critical response centered on several key elements of the proposed regulations:

=== Ketchup ===
Reporting on the proposed directive, Newsweek magazine illustrated its story with a bottle of ketchup captioned "now a vegetable". The proposal was criticized by nutritionists and Democratic politicians who staged photo ops where they dined on nutrition-poor meals that conformed to the new lax standards. Compounding this outrage, the same day that the USDA announced the cost-cutting proposal for school lunches, the White House purchased $209,508 worth of new china and place settings embossed in gold with the presidential seal.

During her testimony before the Subcommittee on Elementary, Secondary, and Vocational Education on September 17, 1981, Food Research and Action Center Director Nancy Amidei described a "mini meal" that she stated would meet the proposed FNS standards made up of a 1.5-ounce (43 g) hamburger, half of a roll, nine grapes, six US fluid ounces (180 ml) of milk, and six French fries. She described a second meal that included "a lot of relish and ketchup on a tiny hamburger" as also meeting the full quantity of both meat and vegetables as established by the new regulations. The Food Research and Action Center, among other nutritional advocacy groups, were part of an opposition campaign that, according to proponents of the new FNS regulations, lacked faith in local school lunch administrators to plan healthy school lunches that adhered to the new standards.

Multiple articles in the press voiced conflicting statements on the ketchup controversy. A September 1981 Reuters piece stated "ketchup, which has a high sugar content, was defined under new Government rules as a vegetable", while a December New York Times piece noted that "ketchup, of course was never mentioned in the proposals, which were designed to give local school officials more flexibility in planning their meals." Administrator Hoagland responded to the media generated by the ketchup controversy, stating "it's an insult to me and to school lunchroom officials to say that we would even consider forcing kids to eat ketchup as a vegetable."

While ketchup was not explicitly referenced as a vegetable substitute in the regulations, James Johnson, an aide to Agriculture Secretary John R. Block, later defended such an interpretation. "There was great misunderstanding in the and as to how these regulations are viewed," Johnson told reporters in September 1981. "I think it would be a mistake to say that ketchup per se was classified as a vegetable. ... Ketchup in combination with other things was classified as a vegetable." Asked for examples of such other things, Johnson replied, "French fries or hamburgers."

According to New York Times reporter Benjamin Weinraub, "the opposition had a Dickensian field day of outrage and mockery that contrasted school children's shrinking meal subsidies with the Pentagon generals' groaning board of budget increases." The condiment became an easy visual for skeptics to cite when criticizing the Reagan Administration and the proposed regulations. Weinraub called the issue "the Emperor's new condiments", and reporter Russell Baker gave President Reagan the tongue-in-cheek "Sore President of the Year Award" writing "it was given to President Reagan on the basis of reports that in spite of the ever-pleasant smile, he is secretly sore on his old botany teacher for telling him that ketchup is a vegetable."

Critics included Republican Senator John Heinz of Pennsylvania, whose family owned the H.J. Heinz company, said, "Ketchup is a condiment. This is one of the most ridiculous regulations I ever heard of, and I suppose I need not add that I know something about ketchup and relish, or did at one time."

=== Changes in income eligibility ===
Under the new standards, "kids who were poor last year aren't anymore", said Edward Cooney, attorney with the Food Research and Action Center and a critic of the regulations. Other advocacy groups including the American School Food Service Association projected that changes in eligibility would drive schools to drop out of the program. Marshall L. Matz, an attorney for the association, stated that less than one third of students would be eligible for subsidized lunches in the majority of school districts. Unless the Federal Government was able to expand assistance, school districts would be unable to serve such higher-priced lunches he hypothesized.

In his testimony before the Subcommittee on Elementary, Secondary, and Vocational Education, Pennsylvania Representative William F. Goodling countered this opinion stating that schools in the country's highest poverty areas would be the least affected by the subsidy reductions and "will be receiving a greater Federal reimbursement than any of the other schools."

As voiced by FNS Administrator Hoagland, increasing the costs for full-priced meals and reducing portion sizes, as recommended in the regulations, were necessary to ensure the continued participation of schools in the School Lunch Program. Low-income children would be hurt more if schools dropped the program as they would not receive free or subsidized lunches.

=== Diluting nutrition ===
Critics of the proposed regulations argued that low-income children would be the most affected by the proposed meal quantity reductions in the plan as they depend upon school lunches for upwards of half of their daily nutrients. Carl D. Perkins, Subcommittee Chairman and US Representative from Kentucky, cited a Washington State study which found the state's low income children received 48 percent of their daily nutrition intake from the meals offered in the School Lunch Program. In the hearing, he voiced the concern of other critics of the regulation, asking, "By watering down the requirements for a school lunch, isn't the department showing it is not concerned with the health of millions of low-income children who cannot supplement their diets with alternative sources of nutrition?"

In his testimony before the Subcommittee on Elementary, Secondary, and Vocational Education, FNS Administrator Hoagland countered this statistic citing the Nationwide Food Consumption Survey of 1977–1978 which found that children's eating patterns have evolved from eating three to now five meals a day, and that the previous theory that children receive one third of nutrients at lunch time was no longer true. In addition, Hoagland noted that the recent expansion of the Food Stamp Program (which supported those with an income of 130 percent of the gross income poverty line) and other similar programs that provided food assistance to low-income children now offered an additional safety net to such populations.

Another argument in support of the adjusted meal plans was voiced by Elizabeth Cagan, director of the New York City Bureau of School Lunches at the subcommittee hearing: "Unless food gets inside a kid, it doesn't give him any nutrition", She added that in New York City she has observed much food served to younger children was wasted – especially green beans, peas, carrots, and mixed vegetables.

== Results ==
On September 25, 1981, President Reagan withdrew the original regulations proposed by the Food and Nutrition Service due in part to the sharp criticism from the opposition. Afterwards the Food and Nutrition Service submitted revised proposals on November 17, 1981 that removed all mention of condiments counting as vegetables and adhered to the goal of providing one third of all daily nutrients in school lunches.

Despite such revisions, the Reagan Administration's policy was never implemented and FNS Administrator Hoagland was fired at the end of November.

"Mr. Hoagland... was lashed on Capitol Hill and skewered by the White House, which removed him from his job two days before Thanksgiving." Hoagland attributed the strength of hunger lobby groups as the source of the FNS regulations downfall. "I may have let the President down by not carefully orchestrating the groups." According to The Washington Post, "there's a lobby guarding every dish."

== Similar efforts ==
In 2011, Congress passed a bill that barred the USDA from changing its nutritional guidelines for school lunches. The proposed changes would have limited the amount of potatoes allowed in lunches, required more green vegetables, and declared a half-cup (120 ml) of tomato paste to count as a serving of vegetables, rather than the current standard of 2 tablespoons (30 mL). The blocking of these proposed higher standards meant that the smaller amount of tomato paste in pizza could continue to be counted as a vegetable in school lunches. The move resulted in widespread mockery, with headlines saying Congress had declared pizza to be a vegetable. The blocking legislation was criticized heavily, since the change had also been lobbied for by food companies such as ConAgra, and the block was a substantial blow to efforts to make school lunches healthier.

== See also ==
- Nix v. Hedden
- School meal programs in the United States
- Stigler diet
