= Moses L. Broocks =

American politician

Moses Lycurgus Broocks
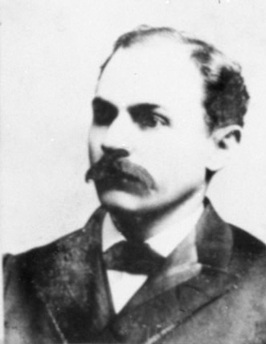

Member of the U.S. House of Representatives from Texas's 2nd district
- In office March 4, 1905 – March 3, 1907
- Preceded by: Samuel B. Cooper
- Succeeded by: Samuel B. Cooper

Personal details
- Born: November 1, 1864 San Augustine, Texas, U.S.
- Died: May 27, 1908 (aged 43) San Augustine, Texas, U.S.
- Education: University of Texas at Austin

Moses Lycurgus Broocks (November 1, 1864 – May 27, 1908) was a U.S. representative from Texas.

Born near San Augustine, Texas, Broocks attended the common schools. He was graduated from the law department of the University of Texas at Austin in 1891 and commenced practice at San Augustine. He served as member of the State house of representatives in 1892. He moved to Beaumont, Texas.

Broocks was elected district attorney of the first judicial district of Texas in 1896 and served one term.

Broocks was elected as a Democrat to the Fifty-ninth Congress (March 4, 1905 – March 3, 1907). He resumed the practice of law in San Augustine, Texas, and died there May 27, 1908. He was interred in Old Broocks Cemetery, about four miles east of San Augustine, Texas.

== Sources ==
- United States Congress. "Moses L. Broocks (id: B000870)". Biographical Directory of the United States Congress.

U.S. House of Representatives
Preceded by Samuel B. Cooper	Member of the U.S. House of Representatives from Texas's 2nd congressional district 1905-1907	Succeeded by Samuel B. Cooper
