= Corinthian Figures =

Collectable sports figurines

Corinthian Figures were big-headed collectable sports figurines manufactured by Corinthian starting in 1990s. This include figurines of Spock, Gianfranco Zola, and John McGinlay.
