= Judith Barzilay =

American judge (born 1944)

Senior Judge of the United States Court of International Trade
- Incumbent
- Assumed office June 2, 2011

Judge of the United States Court of International Trade
- In office March 11, 1998 – June 2, 2011
- Appointed by: Bill Clinton
- Preceded by: Dominick L. DiCarlo
- Succeeded by: Mark A. Barnett

Personal details
- Born: Judith Morgenstern; January 3, 1944 (age 82) Russell, Kansas, U.S.
- Education: Wichita State University (BA); Rutgers University (MLS, JD)

Judith Morgenstern Barzilay (born January 3, 1944) is a senior United States judge of the United States Court of International Trade.

== Biography ==
=== Education ===
Barzilay received a Bachelor of Arts degree in 1965 from Wichita State University. She received a Master of Library Science degree in 1971 from Rutgers University School of Library and Information Science. She received a Juris Doctor in 1981 from Rutgers University School of Law–Newark.

=== Career ===
Barzilay worked as a high school teacher from 1965 to 1967 and again from 1968 to 1969 in Wichita, Kansas, Lawrenceville, New Jersey, and Hamilton Township, Mercer County, New Jersey. She worked as a librarian from 1971 to 1978 in Selden, New York, Woodbridge, New Jersey, Somerville, New Jersey, and East Brunswick, New Jersey. She served as a law clerk to Judge Robert Tarleton of the New Jersey Superior Court from 1981 to 1982. She worked in private practice in Wayne, New Jersey, from 1982 to 1983. She worked as a trial attorney in the International Trade Field Office of the United States Department of Justice in New York City from 1983 to 1986. She worked in private practice in New York City from 1986 to 1988. She served at Sony Electronics Inc. as a senior attorney from 1988 to 1989, Vice President of Import-Export Operations from 1989 to 1995 and Vice President of Government Affairs from 1996 to 1998. She was a member of the Treasury Advisory Committee on Commercial Operations of the United States Customs Service from 1995 to 1998.

== Federal judicial service ==
On January 27, 1998, President Bill Clinton nominated Barzilay to serve as a United States Judge of the United States Court of International Trade, to the seat vacated by Judge Dominick L. DiCarlo. She was confirmed by the Senate on March 11, 1998, and received her commission the same day. She took senior status on June 2, 2011. She is currently inactive.

In addition to hearing disputes before the United States Court of International Trade, Judge Barzilay frequently sat on other federal courts by designation of the Chief Justice of the United States. In particular, Judge Barzilay sat by designation on the United States Courts of Appeals for the Third, Fifth, Sixth, Ninth, and Eleventh Circuits, as well as the United States District Court for the Southern District of New York.

Judge Barzilay is perhaps most well known for her decision in Toy Biz, Inc. v. United States. In that opinion, Judge Barzilay addressed whether certain X-Men action figures were toys, rather than dolls, for customs classification purposes because the action figures represented "nonhuman creatures," lowering the tariff rate from 12 percent to 6.8 percent. The decision generated significant media attention, disappointed legions of X-Men fans, and yielded further discussion in academic circles.

Apart from the Toy Biz decision, Judge Barzilay issued several opinions during her tenure addressing issues of first impression. Those opinions include Michael Simon Design, Inc. v. United States, which concerned a challenge to the President's modification of the Harmonized Tariff Schedule; U.S. Steel Corp. v. United States, which concerned a challenge to the United States Department of Commerce's change in the use of zeroing in investigations; United States v. Nitek Electronics, Inc., which concerned whether the United States Government must exhaust its administrative remedies before imposing penalties on importers; and JBF RAK LLC v. United States, which concerned the United States Department of Commerce's use of its targeted dumping methodology in the context of administrative reviews of antidumping duty orders. The United States Court of Appeals for the Federal Circuit ultimately affirmed each of these opinions.

While serving an active judge of the United States Court of International Trade, Barzilay issued approximately 209 opinions. She authored dozens of other opinions while sitting by designation.

== Sources ==
- FJC Bio

Legal offices
Preceded by Dominick L. DiCarlo	Judge of the United States Court of International Trade; 1998–2011	Succeeded by Mark A. Barnett
