= Timothy C. Stanceu =

American judge (born 1951)

Timothy Charles Stanceu

Senior Judge of the United States Court of International Trade
- Incumbent
- Assumed office April 5, 2021

Chief Judge of the United States Court of International Trade
- In office July 1, 2014 – April 5, 2021
- Preceded by: Donald C. Pogue
- Succeeded by: Mark A. Barnett

Judge of the United States Court of International Trade
- In office March 10, 2003 – April 5, 2021
- Appointed by: George W. Bush
- Preceded by: Richard W. Goldberg
- Succeeded by: Joseph A. Laroski

Personal details
- Born: Timothy Charles Stanceu; 1951 (age 74–75) Canton, Ohio, U.S.
- Relatives: Charley Stanceu (father)
- Education: Colgate University (AB); Georgetown University (JD)

Timothy Charles Stanceu (Romanian: Stanciu; born 1951) is a senior judge of the United States Court of International Trade.

== Biography ==
Stanceu was born in 1951 in Canton, Ohio, to Romanian parents Charley and Marian Stanceu (née Coman). His father Charley was a baseball pitcher for the New York Yankees and Philadelphia Phillies. Stanceu received an Artium Baccalaureus degree in 1973, from Colgate University. He received a Juris Doctor in 1979, from Georgetown University Law Center. He worked as a program analyst and environmental protection specialist for the United States Environmental Protection Agency from 1974 to 1982. He served as special assistant to the assistant secretary in the Office of Enforcement and Operations of the United States Department of the Treasury from 1982 to 1985. He served as Deputy Director of the Office of Trade and Tariff Affairs for the Treasury Department from 1986 to 1989. He worked in private practice in Washington, D.C. from 1990 to 2003.

== Trade Court service ==
On January 7, 2003, President George W. Bush nominated Stanceu to serve as a Judge for the United States Court of International Trade, to the seat vacated by Judge Richard W. Goldberg. He was confirmed by the Senate on March 6, 2003, and received his commission on March 10, 2003. He was elevated to Chief Judge on July 1, 2014, after Donald C. Pogue assumed senior status. Stanceu assumed senior status on April 5, 2021.

Legal offices
Preceded by Richard W. Goldberg	Judge of the United States Court of International Trade; 2003–2021	Succeeded by Joseph A. Laroski
Preceded by Donald C. Pogue	Chief Judge of the United States Court of International Trade; 2014–2021	Succeeded by Mark A. Barnett
