= Richard W. Goldberg =

American judge (1927–2023)

Senior Judge of the United States Court of International Trade
- In office April 2, 2001 – July 18, 2023

Judge of the United States Court of International Trade
- In office March 25, 1991 – April 2, 2001
- Appointed by: George H. W. Bush
- Preceded by: Paul Peter Rao
- Succeeded by: Timothy C. Stanceu

Under Secretary of Agriculture for International Affairs and Commodity Programs Acting
- In office August 1987 – April 1989
- President: Ronald Reagan; George H. W. Bush
- Preceded by: Dan Amstutz
- Succeeded by: Richard T. Crowder

Member of the North Dakota Senate
- In office January 3, 1967 – January 7, 1975

Personal details
- Born: Richard Wayne Goldberg; September 23, 1927 Fargo, North Dakota, U.S.
- Died: July 18, 2023 (aged 95)
- Party: Republican
- Spouse: Mary Borland
- Education: University of Miami (BBA, JD)

Military service
- Branch/service: United States Air Force
- Years of service: 1953–1956 (active); 1956–1957 (reserve)
- Rank: Captain
- Unit: J.A.G. Corps

Richard Wayne Goldberg (September 23, 1927 – July 18, 2023) was a United States Judge of the United States Court of International Trade.

== Education and career ==
Goldberg was born on September 23, 1927, in Fargo, North Dakota. He received a Bachelor of Business Administration degree in 1950 from the University of Miami. He received a Juris Doctor in 1952 from the University of Miami School of Law and worked in private practice in Fargo from 1953 to 1954. Before 1953 he worked at Goldena Mills in West Fargo. He served in the United States Air Force Judge Advocate General's Corps from 1954 to 1956 and as a United States Air Force Reserve captain from 1956 to 1957. He worked in private practice in Washington, D.C., from 1956 to 1957. He served as an attorney and advisor in the Office of Opinion and Review for the Federal Communications Commission from 1957 to 1958. He served as in-house counsel to the Goldberg Feed & Grain Company in West Fargo from 1959 to 1983. He served as president and CEO of the Goldberg Feed & Grain Company from 1969 to 1983. He served as a member of the North Dakota State Senate from 1966 to 1974. He was Deputy Under Secretary for International Affairs and Commodity Programs at the United States Department of Agriculture from 1983 to 1989. He worked in private practice in Washington, D.C., from 1989 to 1991.

== Trade Court service ==
On January 8, 1991, President George H. W. Bush nominated Goldberg to serve as a United States Judge of the United States Court of International Trade, to the seat vacated by Judge Paul Peter Rao. He was confirmed by the United States Senate on March 21, 1991, and received his commission on March 25, 1991. He took senior status on April 2, 2001, and was succeeded by Judge Timothy C. Stanceu.

Goldberg died on July 18, 2023, at the age of 95.

Legal offices
Preceded by Paul Peter Rao	Judge of the United States Court of International Trade; 1991–2001	Succeeded by Timothy C. Stanceu
