= Toy Biz, Inc. v. United States =

2003 United States Court of International Trade ruling

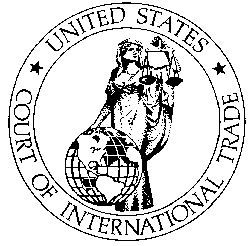
- Court: United States Court of International Trade
- Decided: January 3, 2003
- Docket nos.: 96-10-02291

Questions presented
- Whether Marvel action figures were properly classified as "dolls" representing human beings or as "other toys" representing "non-human creatures" under the Harmonized Tariff Schedule of the United States.

Ruling
- A toy figure must clearly represent a human being to be classified as a "doll" under the HTSUS. Because the Marvel action figures exhibited mutants with non-human characteristics, they were classified as "other toys", granting Toy Biz's motion for summary judgment.

Court membership
- Judge sitting: Judith Barzilay

Toy Biz, Inc. v. United States was a 2003 decision in the United States Court of International Trade that determined that for purposes of tariffs, Toy Biz's Marvel Comics action figures were toys, not dolls, because they represented "nonhuman creatures". This decision effectively halved the tariff rate, from 12 percent tax to 6.8 percent.

== Background ==
The Harmonized Tariff Schedule in US law distinguished between two types of action figures for determining tariffs: dolls, which are defined to include human figures, and toys, which include nonhuman "creatures". Because duties on dolls were higher than those on toys, the toy company Toy Biz argued before the US Court of International Trade, that their Marvel Comics action figures (including the X-Men and Fantastic Four) represented "nonhuman creatures" and were subject to the lower tariff rates for toys instead of the higher ones for dolls. The US Customs Service claimed that the "non-human characteristics" were insufficient in transforming the characters into non-humans. On January 3, 2003, after examining more than 60 action figures, Judge Judith Barzilay ruled in their favor, granting Toy Biz reimbursement for import taxes on previous toys.

== Reaction ==
Because a common theme in Marvel Comics had been the struggle for mutants like the X-Men to prove their humanity, the ruling was surprising to fans. Marvel responded to these concerns by claiming "our heroes are living, breathing human beings – but humans who have extraordinary abilities ... A decision that the X-Men figures indeed do have 'nonhuman' characteristics further proves our characters have special, out-of-this world powers". The case has often been cited as one of the strangest legal cases in US history.

In 2007, the Harmonized Tariff Schedule was amended to eliminate the distinction between dolls and other toys, which are now in the same category.

== See also ==
- Nix v. Hedden, an 1893 case that ruled tomatoes are legally vegetables rather than fruits for tariff purposes
