= Mark A. Barnett =

American judge (born 1963)

Mark Barnett
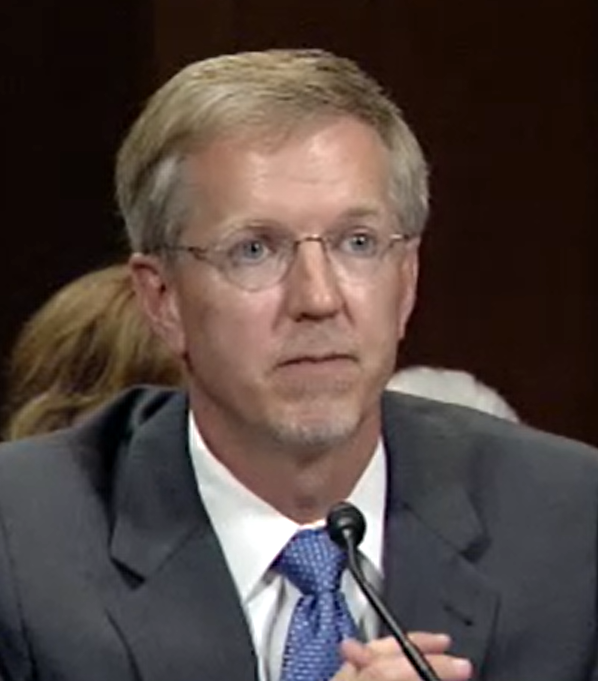

Chief Judge of the United States Court of International Trade
- Incumbent
- Assumed office April 5, 2021
- Preceded by: Timothy C. Stanceu

Judge of the United States Court of International Trade
- Incumbent
- Assumed office May 28, 2013
- Appointed by: Barack Obama
- Preceded by: Judith Barzilay

Personal details
- Born: Mark Allen Barnett; 1963 (age 61–62) Reading, Pennsylvania, U.S.
- Education: Dickinson College (BA); University of Michigan (JD)

Mark Allen Barnett (born 1963) is an American lawyer who has served as the chief judge of the United States Court of International Trade since 2021 and concurrently serving as a judge of the court since 2013.

== Biography ==
Barnett was born in 1963 in Reading, Pennsylvania. He received his Bachelor of Arts degree, magna cum laude, in 1985 from Dickinson College. He received his Juris Doctor, cum laude, in 1988 from the University of Michigan Law School. After graduation, he served as an associate at the law firm of Steptoe & Johnson. From 1995 to 2013, he served as an attorney in the Office of Chief Counsel for the Import Administration at the United States Department of Commerce, becoming Deputy Chief Counsel in 2005. From 2008 to 2009 he was detailed to the United States House of Representatives Committee on Ways & Means, where he served as Trade Counsel for the Subcommittee on Trade.

=== Trade Court service ===
On July 12, 2012, President Barack Obama nominated Barnett to be a United States judge for the United States Court of International Trade, to the seat vacated by Judge Judith Barzilay, who took senior status on June 2, 2011. On September 19, 2012, the Senate Judiciary Committee held a hearing on his nomination and reported his nomination to the floor on December 6, 2012, by voice vote. On January 2, 2013, his nomination was returned to the President, due to the sine die adjournment of the Senate. On January 3, 2013, he was renominated to the same office. His nomination was reported by the Senate Judiciary Committee on February 14, 2013, by voice vote. On May 23, 2013, he was confirmed by voice vote. He received his commission on May 28, 2013. He became Chief Judge on April 5, 2021, after Timothy C. Stanceu assumed senior status.

Legal offices
Preceded by Judith Barzilay	Judge of the United States Court of International Trade; 2013–present	Incumbent
Preceded by Timothy C. Stanceu	Chief Judge of the United States Court of International Trade; 2021–present	Incumbent
