= Joseph A. Laroski, Jr. =

American judge (born 1971)

Joseph Laroski
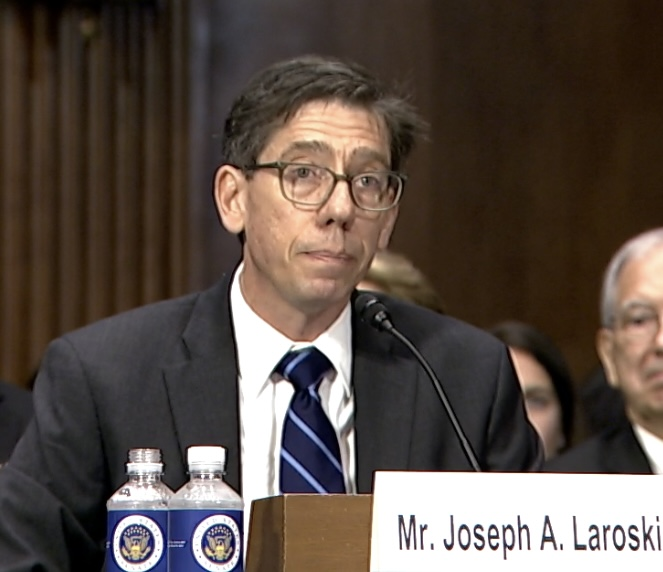

Judge of the United States Court of International Trade
- Incumbent
- Assumed office February 14, 2024
- Appointed by: Joe Biden
- Preceded by: Timothy C. Stanceu

Personal details
- Born: Joseph Albert Laroski Jr. 1971 (age 54–55) Red Bank, New Jersey, U.S.
- Education: Georgetown University (BS, LLM); Fordham University (JD)

Joseph Albert Laroski Jr. (born 1971) is an American lawyer from Washington, D.C. who is serving as a United States judge of the United States Court of International Trade.

== Early life and education ==
Raised in Red Bank, New Jersey, Laroski graduated from Red Bank Catholic High School. Laroski received a Bachelor in Foreign Service from the Walsh School of Foreign Service in 1993, a Juris Doctor from Fordham University School of Law in 1997 and a Master of Laws from the Georgetown University Law Center in 1998.

== Career ==
After graduating law school, Laroski served as a law clerk for Judge Dominick L. DiCarlo of the United States Court of International Trade from 1998 to 1999. From 1999 to 2004, he was an associate at Skadden, Arps, Slate, Meagher & Flom, from 2004 to 2006, associate at Willkie Farr & Gallagher, from 2006 to 2008, he was an associate at Vinson & Elkins, from 2008 to 2012, Laroski was an Associate General Counsel at the Office of the U.S. Trade Representative, where he was responsible for legal matters involving customs, labor, and technical barriers to trade. From 2012 to 2016, he was a counsel at King & Spalding. From 2016 to 2017, he was an attorney-advisor for the U.S. International Trade Commission. From 2017 to 2021, he was deputy assistant secretary for policy and negotiations and director of policy within the International Trade Administration at the United States Department of Commerce, where he oversaw programs and policies regarding the enforcement and administration of U.S. antidumping duty and countervailing duty laws. From 2021 to 2024, Laroski was a partner at Schagrin Associates.

=== Trade court service ===
On June 28, 2023, President Joe Biden announced his intent to nominate Laroski to serve as a United States judge of the United States Court of International Trade. On July 11, 2023, his nomination was sent to the Senate. President Biden nominated Laroski to the seat vacated by Judge Timothy C. Stanceu, who assumed senior status on April 5, 2021. On July 26, 2023, a hearing on his nomination was held before the Senate Judiciary Committee. On September 14, 2023, his nomination was reported out of committee by a 18–3 vote. On January 3, 2024, his nomination was returned to the president under Rule XXXI, Paragraph 6 of the United States Senate and he was renominated on January 8, 2024. On January 18, 2024, his nomination was reported out of committee by a 21–0 vote. On February 1, 2024, the Senate invoked cloture on his nomination by a 97–0 vote. On February 5, 2024, his nomination was confirmed by a 76–0 vote. He received his judicial commission on February 14, 2024.

Legal offices
Preceded by Timothy C. Stanceu	Judge of the United States Court of International Trade; 2024–present	Incumbent
