= Albert Frederick Schoenhut =

American businessman

Albert Frederick Schoenhut (1849–1912) created the A. Schoenhut Company, one of the leading toy producers in America at the turn of the twentieth century. In 1872, he founded the Schoenhut Piano Company in Philadelphia, which later became known as the A. Schoenhut Company and was incorporated in 1897. They established a reputation, based on German handicraft traditions, and created toy pianos and other musical instruments in the early days. Eventually, they introduced dolls, play sets, games and more and they became the largest toy manufacturer in America. In 1919, Schoenhut patented his “All-Wood Perfection Art Doll” and in 1997, the United States Postal Service issued stamps of Classic American Dolls and included his wooden dolls as part of the collection.
