= Schoenhut doll =

Wooden dolls produced by the Schoenhut Piano Company

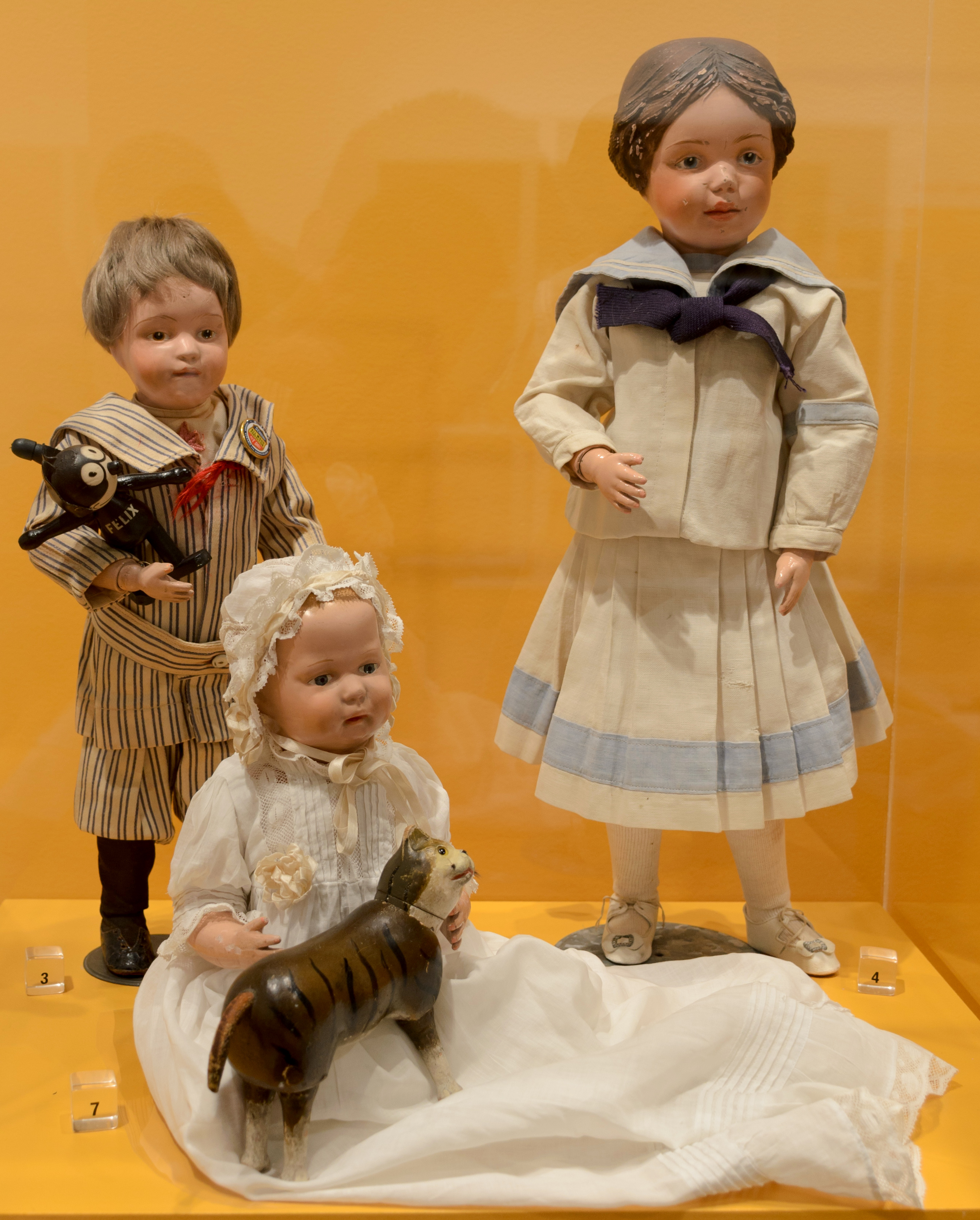
- Schoenhut dolls at the Philadelphia History Museum
- Type: Figurines, dolls
- Invented by: Albert Schoenhut
- Company: Schoenhut Piano Company
- Materials: Wood

Schoenhut dolls are wooden dolls formerly produced by the Schoenhut Piano Company between 1903 and 1935. The company, founded by woodworker Albert Schoenhut, initially made toy pianos. They began to produce figurines in the early 1900s, including wooden circus-themed sets and animals.

The company introduced the Schoenhut Art Doll in 1911, a spring-jointed doll made entirely of wood. It was the first doll in the world able to be manipulated and posed. (Note: According to the Museum of American Heritage, the Schoenhut Art Dolls were the first dolls in the world that were able to be manipulated and hold poses.) The company ceased making dolls after its bankruptcy in 1935. Though it was revived the following year, it only produced toy pianos.

== History ==
=== Early figurines and dolls ===
The Schoenhut Company began producing dolls as early as 1903 with the production of the Humpty Dumpty Circus set, featuring lady and gentleman acrobats, a lion tamer, a lady circus rider, and a ringmaster. In 1908, Rolly Dolly dolls were created, which featured pear-shaped bodies with weights inside that allow the toy to bob back and forth without tipping over. A fifty-three piece set called Teddy Roosevelt's Adventures in Africa was also made, based on the Smithsonian–Roosevelt African Expedition.

=== All-Wood Perfection Art Doll ===
After submitting a patent application 1909, the company patented the All-Wood Perfection Art Doll in 1911, which featured solid wood heads (some with carved hair, and others with wigs), compressed spring metal joints, and holes in the feet, which allows the dolls to be manipulated and posed on stands. They were the first dolls produced in the world that were able to do this.

Various styles of the dolls existed, in 14-inch, 16-inch, 19-inch and 21-inch sizes. Face variations included a character face with carved hair and intaglio eyes; a character face with wig and intaglio eyes; a girl adorning a bonnet, with the cap molded to the head; Schnickel-Fritz, which featured molded wavy hair and squinting painted-on eyes; Tootsie Wootsie, with lightly molded short hair; and an African American doll with molded curly hair. Sleepy-eyed child dolls were also produced, which featured eyes that close upon laying the doll horizontal. A Dolly Face style was produced in 1915, which featured rounded cheeks and eyes.

Schoenhut Art Dolls, in addition to many other early toys made by the company, have become collector's items. According to a 2008 appraisal, 14 inches (0.36 m)–16 inches (0.41 m) Schoenhut dolls with carved hair and intaglio eyes were worth an estimated USD$2,800–2,900.

== See also ==
- Schoenhut Piano Company
- History of dolls

== Works cited ==
- Herlocher, Dawn (2005). 200 Years of Dolls: Identification and Price Guide (3rd ed.). Krause Publications. ISBN 978-0-896-89167-8.
- Collectible Dolls. Warman's Companion. Krause Publications. 24 September 2008. ISBN 978-1-440-21921-4.
