= David Hayes Kincheloe =

American politician and jurist

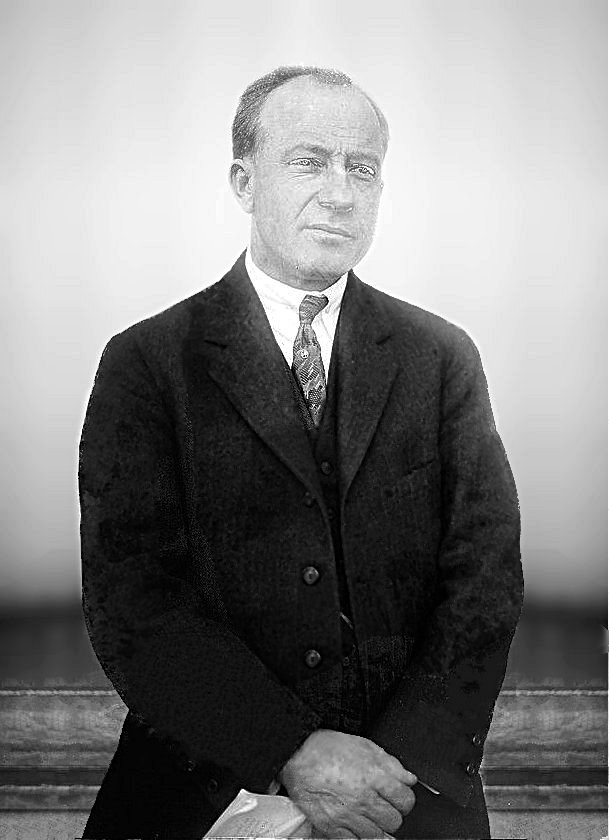

Judge of the United States Customs Court
- In office September 22, 1930 – April 30, 1948
- Appointed by: Herbert Hoover
- Preceded by: George Emery Weller
- Succeeded by: Paul Peter Rao

Member of the U.S. House of Representatives from Kentucky's 2nd district
- In office March 4, 1915 – October 5, 1930
- Preceded by: Augustus Owsley Stanley
- Succeeded by: John Lloyd Dorsey Jr.

Personal details
- Born: David Hayes Kincheloe; April 9, 1877 Sacramento, Kentucky, U.S.
- Died: April 16, 1950 (aged 73) Washington, D.C., U.S.
- Resting place: Odd Fellows Cemetery; Madisonville, Kentucky
- Party: Democratic
- Education: Western Kentucky University (B.S.) read law

David Hayes Kincheloe (April 9, 1877 – April 16, 1950) was a United States representative from Kentucky and a judge of the United States Customs Court.

== Education and early life ==
Born on April 9, 1877, near Sacramento, Kentucky, Kincheloe attended the public schools and received a Bachelor of Science degree from Bowling Green Business College (now Western Kentucky University) in 1898. He read law, was admitted to the bar in 1899, and commenced practice in Calhoun, Kentucky. He served as prosecuting attorney of McLean County, Kentucky from 1902 to 1906. He moved to Madisonville, Kentucky in 1906 and continued the practice of law.

== Congressional service ==
Kincheloe was elected as a Democrat to the United States House of Representatives of the 64th United States Congress and to the seven succeeding Congresses and served from March 4, 1915, until his resignation on October 5, 1930, having been appointed to the bench.

== Federal Judicial Service ==
Kincheloe received a recess appointment from President Herbert Hoover on September 22, 1930, to a seat on the United States Customs Court vacated by Judge George Emery Weller. He was nominated to the same position by President Hoover on December 4, 1930. He was confirmed by the United States Senate on January 22, 1931, and received his commission on January 29, 1931. His service terminated on April 30, 1948, due to his retirement.

== Death ==
Kincheloe died in Washington, D.C., on April 16, 1950. He was interred in Odd Fellows Cemetery in Madisonville.

== Sources ==
- "David Hayes Kincheloe". Biographical Directory of the United States Congress.

U.S. House of Representatives
Preceded by Augustus Owsley Stanley	Member of the U.S. House of Representatives from Kentucky's 2nd congressional district 1915–1930	Succeeded by John Lloyd Dorsey Jr.
Legal offices
Preceded by George Emery Weller	Judge of the United States Customs Court; 1930–1948	Succeeded by Paul Peter Rao
