= Toy Biz =

American toy company

Toy Biz, Inc.
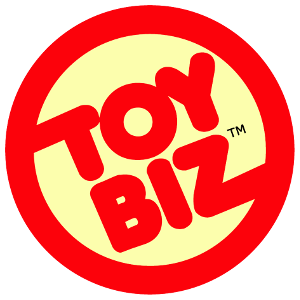
- Traded as: Toy Biz (1988–2006); Marvel Toys (2005–2007)
- Founded: January 1988; 38 years ago, in Long Island, New York
- Defunct: August 2007; 19 years ago in New York City, New York
- Fate: Restructured from a standalone company to corporate division, later closed by owners
- Key people: Isaac Perlmutter; Avi Arad (toy designer); Jesse Falcon (toy designer)
- Products: Action figures, playsets, vehicles, role-play, dolls, stuffed toys
- Owner: Marvel Entertainment, Inc. (1998–2007)

Toy Biz, Inc. (later known as Marvel Toys) was a toy manufacturer. The company is best known for holding the Marvel Comics toy license from 1990 to 2006.

In 1993, Marvel Entertainment Group acquired a minority stake in Toy Biz. In 1998, Toy Biz merged with Marvel Entertainment Group to bring it out of bankruptcy, with the two merged companies becoming Marvel Enterprises. Toy Biz would continue as the name of its toy manufacturing division.

In 2005, the division would start to use the name Marvel Toys, as well as Toy Biz, to reflect the Marvel Cinematic Universe. In January 2006, Hasbro acquired the Marvel Comics toy license, to release its first products in January 2007. The division continued to release toys for its non-Marvel licenses until August 2007.

== History ==
=== Predecessor ===
Chantex, Inc was a Canadian manufacturing company founded in the late 19th century by the Zuckerman family. The business grew to sales of $4.5 million in 1980. In 1980, Chantex, Inc merged with Earl Takefman's Randim Marketing, Inc, a school supply manufacturer and wholesaler, to become Charan Industries, Inc. Charan Industries, Inc. would expand into other businesses, including acquiring a hockey equipment brand in the mid-1980s. Its Charan Toy Co. Inc. subsidiary had become a leading licensing toy company by 1985, and would later have an action figure license with DC Comics.

=== Formation and licensing expansion ===
In January 1988, Charan Industries, Inc. established an American firm, Toy Biz, Inc. The company was originally based in the Rockville Centre, Long Island, New York. Toy Biz released its first action figures in 1989, for DC Comics. In 1990, Toy Biz was purchased by businessman Ike Perlmutter, and would produce action figures for Marvel Comics.

In 1993, Toy Biz made a deal with Marvel Entertainment Group where Toy Biz were granted "exclusive, perpetual, royalty-free licenses" to create toys of Marvel Comics characters and intellectual property, in exchange for Marvel Entertainment Group acquiring 46 percent of Toy Biz equity. Avi Arad, a toy designer and comic book fan, joined Toy Biz that same year.

Toy Biz would continue to expand outside of its core Marvel Comics license, namely through other licenses such as Hercules: The Legendary Journeys, Xena: Warrior Princess and NASCAR. Toy Biz also partnered with Gerber to produce a line of baby dolls.

In 1995, Toy Biz acquired Spectra Star, Inc, a kite and yo-yo manufacturer, and Quest Aerospace, model rocket kit manufacturer.

In February 1996, Toy Biz and Apple Computer entered a licensing agreement to develop, manufacture and distribute Apple for Kids, a new line of mass-market electronic learning aids and other learning toys and products bearing the Apple logo.

In the late 1990s, Marvel Entertainment Group filed for bankruptcy and became the subject of a battle for control in bankruptcy court.

=== Marvel Enterprises merger ===
In June 1998, Marvel Entertainment Group merged with Toy Biz, Inc. The new company became Marvel Enterprises, with the 'Toy Biz' name used as its in-house toy division.

In 1998, Toy Biz ventured into professional wrestling, acquiring the master toy license for World Championship Wrestling (WCW). However, the license deal was short-lived, as WCW was purchased by the World Wrestling Federation (WWF) in March 2001 for $2.5 million, following sustained financial losses.

In 2001, Marvel Enterprises licensed the rights to the Toy Biz name to a Hong Kong–based toy manufacturer, Toy Biz Worldwide Ltd. Toy Biz also outsourced much of its manufacturing to Toy Biz Worldwide Ltd.

Beginning in 2001, Toy Biz had signed a license for the upcoming Peter Jackson’s The Lord of the Rings film trilogy. The licensing agreement represented a significant achievement for the company, as it secured the merchandising rights from New Line Cinema despite competition from other toy manufacturers. Toy Biz had previously established a relationship with New Line Cinema on its Blade toy line. The Lord of the Rings toy line continued until 2005, spanning the release of the trilogy and its associated merchandise.

In the mid-2000s, Toy Biz/Marvel Toys would become the licensee for Total Nonstop Action Wrestling (TNA), Curious George and the Cartoon Network series, Code Lyoko.

The Marvel Toys logo was used on some lines from 2005 onwards, but appeared on all lines by 2007.

=== Decline ===
In January 2006, Marvel Entertainment signed a five-year licensing agreement with Hasbro Inc. for $205 million, giving Hasbro the right to make toys and games based on Marvel Comic licenses. As a result of this, Marvel Entertainment prematurely terminated its agreements with Toy Biz Worldwide Ltd, by a year. As a result of the early termination, Marvel Entertainment paid Toy Biz Worldwide Ltd. a penalty of between $13–16 million USD.

Following the loss of the Marvel Comics license to Hasbro in January 2007, the Marvel Toys division released a new series called Legendary Comic Book Heroes between July 2007 and August 2007 – making action figures of non-Marvel Comic characters. The division released its final TNA and Curious George assortments in August 2007. In May 2008, Marvel Entertainment reported it had finalized its exit from direct toy operations during Q1 2008, officially closing Marvel Toys.

== Legacy ==
In 2022, Hasbro released updated versions of Toy Biz's first wave of Marvel Legends figures to celebrate the line's twentieth anniversary.

== See also ==
- Toy Biz v. United States, a court case that determined that Toy Biz action figures were toys, not dolls.
