= John Lloyd Dorsey Jr. =

American politician (1891–1960)

John Lloyd Dorsey Jr. (August 10, 1891 – March 22, 1960) was a representative from the U.S. state of Kentucky. He was born in Henderson, Kentucky, August 10, 1891; educated in the public schools and at Bethel College, Russellville, Kentucky. He graduated from Centre College, Danville, Kentucky, in 1912. He studied law at Centre College, was admitted to the bar in 1913 and commenced practice in Henderson, Kentucky.

Dorsey served as a private in Headquarters Company, One Hundred and Fifty-ninth Depot Brigade, in 1918; executive Democratic committeeman 1920–1924; city attorney of Henderson in 1926 and 1930. He was elected as a Democrat to the Seventy-first Congress to fill the vacancy caused by the resignation of David H. Kincheloe and served from November 4, 1930, to March 3, 1931. He was not a candidate for election to the Seventy-second Congress in 1930, and resumed the practice of law. He again served as city attorney of Henderson in 1936 and 1937, and continued the practice of law until his death in Henderson, Kentucky, March 22, 1960. He is interred in Fernwood Cemetery.

U.S. House of Representatives
Preceded by David Hayes Kincheloe	Member of the U.S. House of Representatives from Kentucky's 2nd congressional district November 4, 1930 – March 3, 1931	Succeeded by Glover H. Cary
