= Charley Stanceu =

American baseball player (1916-1969)

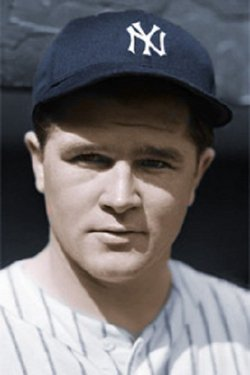
- Stanceu with the New York Yankees
- Pitcher
- Born: January 9, 1916; Canton, Ohio, U.S.
- Died: April 3, 1969 (aged 53); Canton, Ohio, U.S.
- Batted: Right Threw: Right

MLB debut
- April 16, 1941, for the New York Yankees

Last MLB appearance
- September 26, 1946, for the Philadelphia Phillies

MLB statistics
- Win–loss record: 5–7
- Earned run average: 4.93
- Strikeouts: 47
- Stats at Baseball Reference

Teams
- New York Yankees (1941, 1946); Philadelphia Phillies (1946)

Career highlights and awards
- World Series champion (1941)

Charles Stanceu (Romanian: Charles Stanciu; January 9, 1916 – April 3, 1969) was an American professional baseball player of Romanian descent who played in 39 Major League games in 1941 and 1946 with the New York Yankees and the Philadelphia Phillies. A pitcher, he batted and threw right-handed.

== Career ==
After growing up in Canton, Ohio, Stanceu, played minor league baseball beginning in 1934 and ending in 1949. Perhaps his best success was with the 1940 Kansas City Blues for which he went 15–8. After his major league days he pitched three seasons for Columbus.

Stanceu was member of the 1941 Yankees team who won the 1941 World Series. He appeared in 22 games for the 1941 Yankees team, which won 101 games as well as the 1941 World Series.

During World War II, Stanceu was in the US Army. He came back in 1946 to pitch some more for the 1946 Yankees as well as for the 1946 Phillies. After three games in 1946 with the Yankees, he was selected off waivers by the Phillies and pitched in 14 more games for them in that season.

== After baseball ==
After baseball, Stanceu worked for the Monarch Rubber Company in Hartville, Ohio. He died on April 3, 1969, aged 53, of a heart attack.

His son, Timothy, was the Chief Judge of the United States Court of International Trade from 2014 to 2021.
