= Samuel B. Cooper =

American politician (1850–1918)

Samuel Bronson Cooper
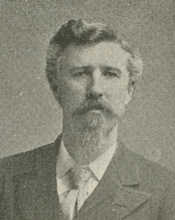

Member of the Board of General Appraisers
- In office May 26, 1910 – August 21, 1918
- Appointed by: William Howard Taft
- Preceded by: Marion De Vries
- Succeeded by: George Emery Weller

Member of the U.S. House of Representatives from Texas's 2nd district
- In office March 4, 1907 – March 3, 1909
- Preceded by: Moses L. Broocks
- Succeeded by: Martin Dies Sr.
- In office March 4, 1893 – March 3, 1905
- Preceded by: John B. Long
- Succeeded by: Moses L. Broocks

Member of the Texas Senate from the 1st district
- In office January 11, 1881 – January 13, 1885
- Preceded by: Edwin Hobby
- Succeeded by: William L. Douglass

Personal details
- Born: Samuel Bronson Cooper; May 30, 1850 Caldwell County, Kentucky, U.S.
- Died: August 21, 1918 (aged 68) New York City, U.S.
- Resting place: Magnolia Cemetery; Beaumont, Texas
- Party: Democratic

Samuel Bronson Cooper (May 30, 1850 – August 21, 1918) was a United States representative from Texas and a member of the Board of General Appraisers.

== Education and career ==
Born on May 30, 1850, near Eddyville in Caldwell County, Kentucky, Cooper moved to Texas with his family the same year and located in Woodville, Tyler County, Texas and attended the common schools. Cooper read law and was admitted to the bar in 1871. He entered private practice in Woodville from 1872 to 1885. He was prosecutor for Tyler County from 1876 to 1880. He was a member of the Texas Senate from 1881 to 1885. He was appointed the Collector of Internal Revenue for the First District of Texas in Galveston by President Grover Cleveland, serving from 1885 to 1888. He was an unsuccessful candidate for Texas district judge in 1888.

== Congressional service ==
Cooper was elected as a Democrat to the United States House of Representatives of the 53rd United States Congress and to the five succeeding Congresses, serving from March 4, 1893, to March 3, 1905. He was an unsuccessful candidate for reelection to the 59th United States Congress. He was again elected to the 60th United States Congress and served from March 4, 1907, to March 3, 1909. He was an unsuccessful candidate for reelection to the 61st United States Congress.

== Federal judicial service ==
Cooper was nominated by President William Howard Taft on May 16, 1910, to a seat on the Board of General Appraisers vacated by Marion De Vries. He was confirmed by the United States Senate on May 24, 1910, and received his commission on May 26, 1910. His service terminated on August 21, 1918, due to his death in New York City, New York. He was succeeded by George Emery Weller. He was interred in Magnolia Cemetery in Beaumont, Jefferson County, Texas.

== Family ==
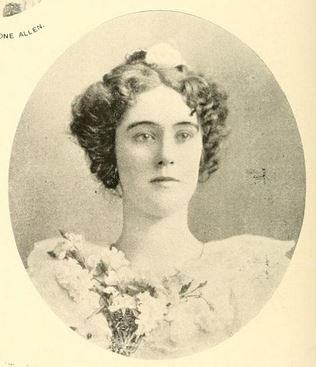
Willie C. Cooper

Cooper's daughter, Willie C. Cooper, was born in Woodville. At the age of sixteen she was graduated from the Texas Female College with first honors.

Willie was the first wife of William P. Hobby.

== Legacy ==
The town of Bronson, Texas was named for his honor by John Henry Kirby.

== Sources ==
- United States Congress. "Samuel B. Cooper (id: C000761)". Biographical Directory of the United States Congress.
- "Board of General Appraisers: Cooper, Samuel Bronson - Federal Judicial Center". www.fjc.gov.

U.S. House of Representatives
Preceded by John B. Long	Member of the U.S. House of Representatives from Texas's 2nd congressional district 1893–1905	Succeeded by Moses L. Broocks
Preceded by Moses L. Broocks	Member of the U.S. House of Representatives from Texas's 2nd congressional district 1907–1909	Succeeded by Martin Dies Sr.
Legal offices
Preceded by Marion De Vries	Member of the Board of General Appraisers; 1910–1918	Succeeded by George Emery Weller
