= Nix v. Hedden =

- Supreme Court of the United States

Submitted April 24, 1892 Decided May 10, 1893
- Full case name: John Nix, John W. Nix, George W. Nix, and Frank W. Nix v. Edward L. Hedden, Collector of the Port of New York
- Citations: 149 U.S. 304 (more) 13 S. Ct. 981; 37 L. Ed. 745; 1893 U.S. LEXIS 2303

Case history
- Prior: Judgment for defendant, 39 F. 109 (C.C. S.D.N.Y. 1889)
- Subsequent: None

Holding
- Tomatoes are "vegetables" and not "fruit" within the meaning of the Tariff Act of 1883 based on the common meaning of those words.

Court membership
- Chief Justice Melville Fuller Associate Justices Stephen J. Field · John M. Harlan; Horace Gray · Samuel Blatchford; David J. Brewer · Henry B. Brown; George Shiras Jr. · Howell E. Jackson

Case opinion
- Majority: Gray, joined by unanimous

Laws applied
- Tariff Act of 1883 (Mongrel Tariff)

Nix v. Hedden, 149 U.S. 304 (1893), is a decision by the Supreme Court of the United States in which the Court unanimously held that tomatoes should be classified as vegetables rather than fruits for purposes of tariffs, imports and customs. Justice Horace Gray delivered the opinion of the Court in holding that the Tariff Act of 1883 used the ordinary meaning of the words "fruit" and "vegetable", instead of the technical botanical meaning.

== Background ==
John Nix founded the John Nix & Co. fruit commission in New York City in 1839. The company became one of the largest sellers of produce in New York City at the time, and was one of the first companies to ship produce from Virginia, Florida, and Bermuda to New York.

On March 3, 1883, President Chester A. Arthur signed the Tariff Act of 1883, requiring a tax to be paid on imported vegetables, but not fruit. The John Nix & Co. company filed a suit against Edward L. Hedden, Collector of the Port of New York, to recover back duties paid under protest. They argued against the tariff by pointing out that, botanically, a tomato is a fruit due to its seed-bearing structure growing from the flowering part of a plant.

At the trial, the plaintiffs' counsel entered into evidence definitions of the words "fruit" and "vegetables" from Webster's Dictionary, Worcester's Dictionary, and the Imperial Dictionary. They called two witnesses, who had been in the business of selling fruit and vegetables for 30 years, and asked them, after hearing these definitions, to say whether these words had "any special meaning in trade or commerce, different from those read".

During testimony, one witness testified that in regard to the dictionary definition:

[the dictionary] does not classify all things there, but they are correct as far as they go. It does not take all kinds of fruit or vegetables; it takes a portion of them. I think the words 'fruit' and 'vegetable' have the same meaning in trade today that they had on March 1, 1883. I understand that the term 'fruit' is applied in trade only to such plants or parts of plants as contain the seeds. There are more vegetables than those in the enumeration given in Webster's Dictionary under the term 'vegetable,' as 'cabbage, cauliflower, turnips, potatoes, peas, beans, and the like,' probably covered by the words 'and the like'

Another witness testified that "I don't think the term 'fruit' or the term 'vegetables' had, in March 1883, and prior thereto, any special meaning in trade and commerce in this country different from that which I have read here from the dictionaries."

Both the plaintiffs' counsel and the defendant's counsel made use of the dictionaries. The plaintiffs' counsel read in evidence from the same dictionaries the definitions of the word tomato, while the defendant's counsel then read in evidence from Webster's Dictionary the definitions of the words pea, eggplant, cucumber, squash, and pepper. Countering this, the plaintiff then read in evidence from Webster's and Worcester's dictionaries the definitions of potato, turnip, parsnip, cauliflower, cabbage, carrot and bean.

== Decision ==
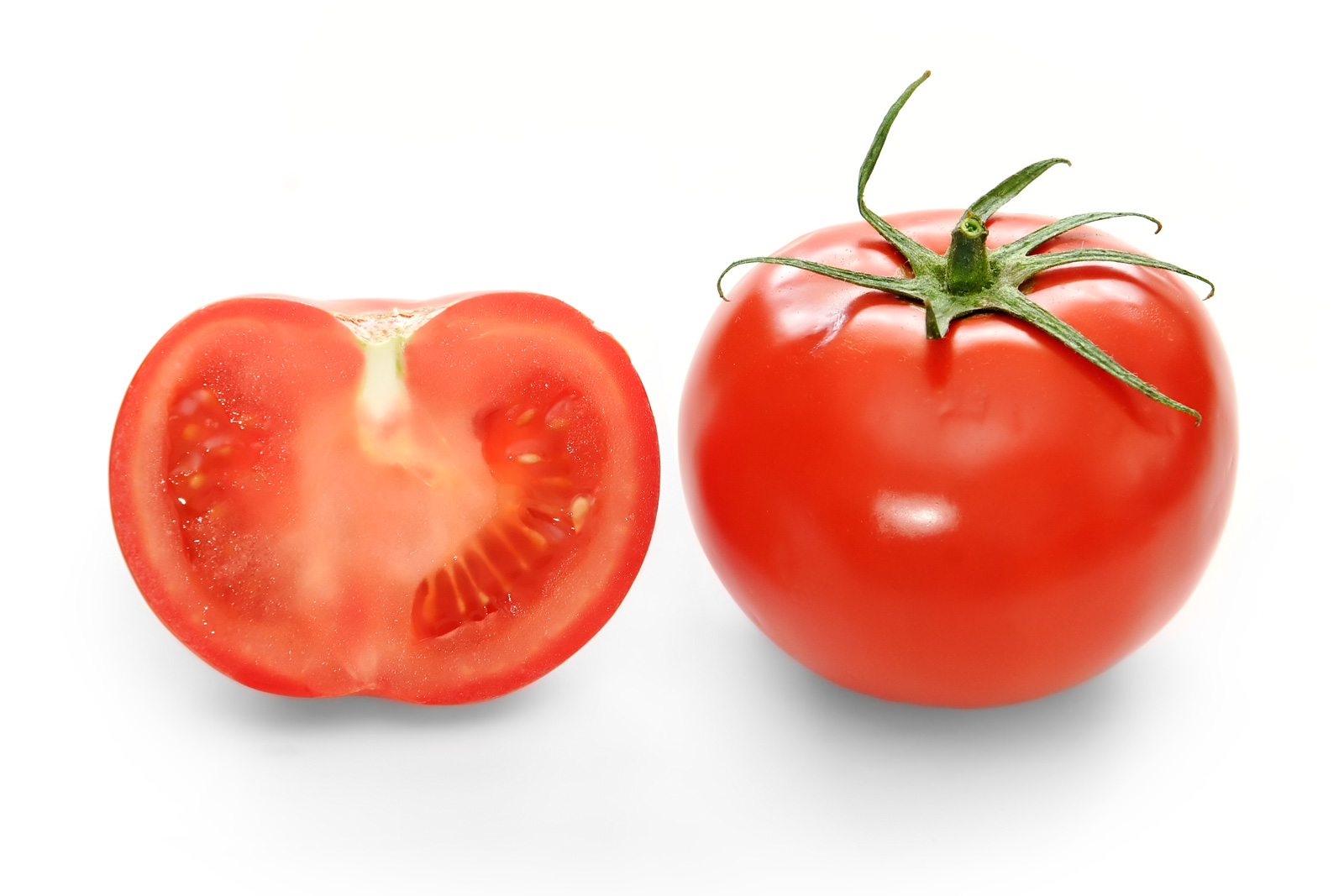
Botanically, a tomato is a fruit. However, in common parlance it is a vegetable; hence the United States Supreme Court ruled that a tomato is a vegetable for the purposes of the customs regulations.

The court unanimously decided in favor of the respondent and found that the tomato should be classified under the customs regulations as a vegetable, based on the ways in which it is used, and the popular perception to this end. Justice Horace Gray, writing the opinion for the Court, stated that:

The passages cited from the dictionaries define the word 'fruit' as the seed of plants, or that part of plants which contains the seed, and especially the juicy, pulpy products of certain plants, covering and containing the seed. These definitions have no tendency to show that tomatoes are 'fruit,' as distinguished from 'vegetables,' in common speech, or within the meaning of the tariff act.

Justice Gray, citing several Supreme Court cases (Brown v. Piper, 91 U.S. 37, 42, and Jones v. U.S., 137 U.S. 202, 216) stated that when words have acquired no special meaning in trade or commerce, the ordinary meaning must be used by the court. In this case dictionaries cannot be admitted as evidence, but only as aids to the memory and understanding of the court. Gray acknowledged that botanically, tomatoes are classified as a "fruit of the vine"; nevertheless, they are seen as vegetables because they were usually eaten as a main course instead of being eaten as a dessert. In making his decision, Justice Gray mentioned another case where it had been claimed that beans were seeds — Justice Bradley, in Robertson v. Salomon, 130 U.S. 412, 414, similarly found that though a bean is botanically a seed, in common parlance a bean is seen as a vegetable. While on the subject, Gray clarified the status of the cucumber, squash, pea, and bean.

== Legacy ==
Nix has been cited in three Supreme Court decisions as a precedent for court interpretation of common meanings, especially dictionary definitions. (Sonn v. Maggone, 159 U.S. 417 (1895); Saltonstall v. Wiebusch & Hilger, 156 U.S. 601 (1895); and Cadwalader v. Zeh, 151 U.S. 171 (1894)). Additionally, in JSG Trading Corp. v. Tray-Wrap, Inc., 917 F.2d 75 (2d Cir. 1990), a case unrelated to Nix aside from the shared focus on tomatoes, a judge wrote the following paragraph citing the case:

In common parlance tomatoes are vegetables, as the Supreme Court observed long ago [see Nix v. Hedden 149 U.S. 304, 307, 13 S.Ct. 881, 882, 37 L.Ed. 745 (1893)], although botanically speaking they are actually a fruit. [26 Encyclopedia Americana 832 (Int'l. ed. 1981)]. Regardless of classification, people have been enjoying tomatoes for centuries; even Mr. Pickwick, as Dickens relates, ate his chops in "tomata" sauce.

In 2005, supporters in the New Jersey Legislature cited Nix as a basis for a bill designating the tomato as the official state vegetable.

== See also ==
- Carrot – defined to be a fruit in European Union law, for the purpose of jam classification, in addition to tomatoes and other produce (see Annex III(A)(1), Council Directive 2001/113/EC of 20 December 2001 relating to fruit jams, jellies and marmalades and sweetened chestnut purée intended for human consumption)
- Ketchup as a vegetable
- Jaffa Cakes, the subject of a 1991 UK tribunal which decided that they were cakes, rather than biscuits (cookies), which would attract value-added tax.
- Toy Biz v. United States – decided that action figures of certain superheroes are legally toys, not dolls
- List of United States Supreme Court cases, volume 149
