= Schoenhut Piano Company =

American wooden toy company

- Industry: Woodworking
- Founded: 1872; 153 years ago in Philadelphia, Pennsylvania, U.S.
- Founder: Albert Frederick Schoenhut
- Headquarters: United States
- Products: Toy pianos; dolls
- Website: toypiano.com

The Schoenhut Piano Company is an American manufacturer of toy pianos, dolls, and other wooden toys. It was founded in 1872 in Philadelphia as the A. Schoenhut Company by German immigrant and woodcarver Albert Schoenhut, who had begun making toy pianos during his youth in Germany. Both his father and grandfather had been toy and doll-makers. The company began with making toy pianos and soon expanded to other toys such as dolls, doll houses, and circus figures. By the time of Albert Schoenhut's death in 1912, Schoenhut Piano Company had grown to become the largest toy company in the United States, and the first to export its products to Germany. The Great Depression forced the company into bankruptcy in 1935, but a year later Otto Schoenhut opened a new company called O. Schoenhut, Inc., continuing the legacy. It was purchased in the 1980s by the Trinca family.

== Products ==
=== Toy pianos ===
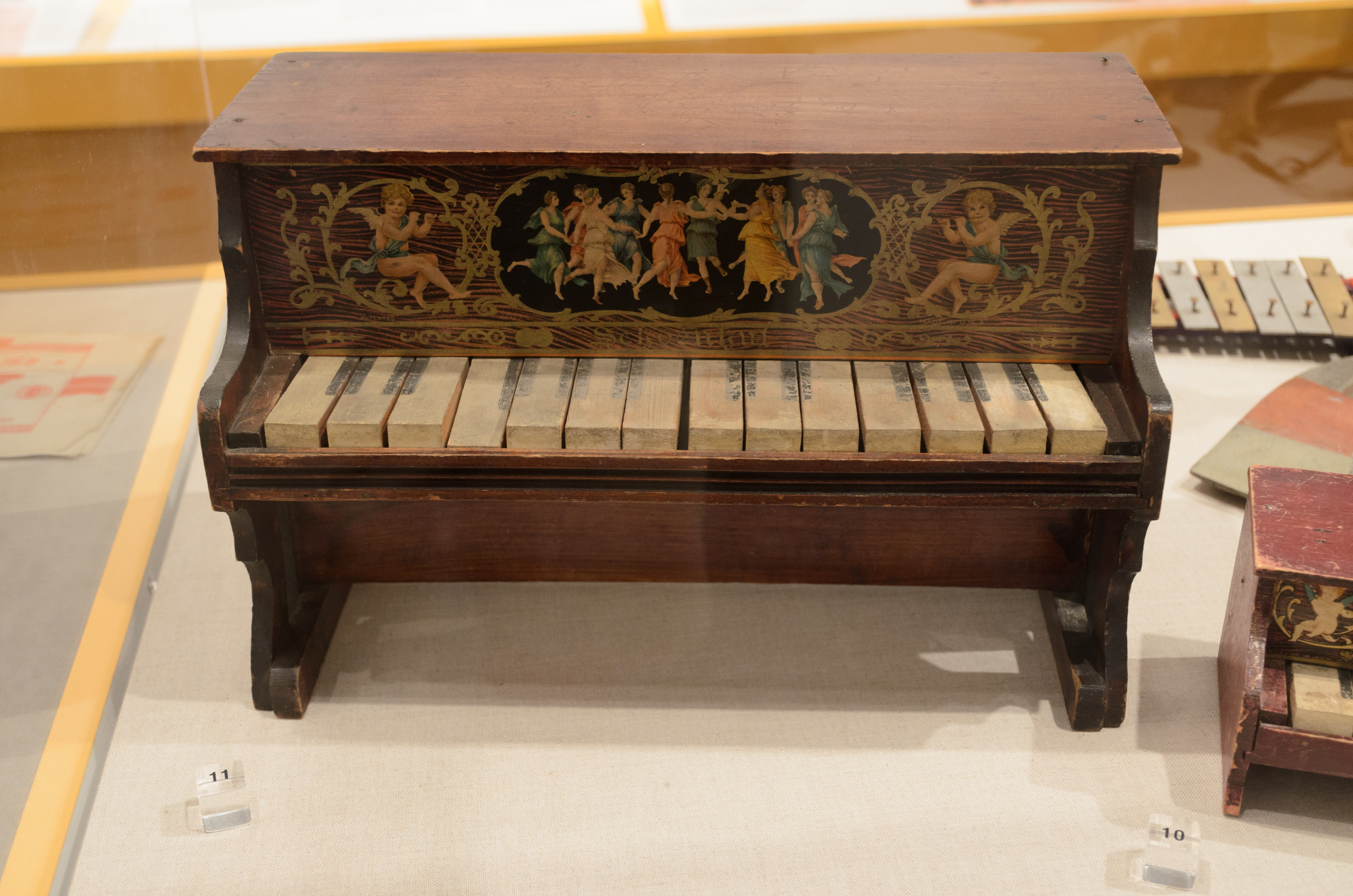
Fourteen-key Schoenhut metallic piano

Schoenhut toy pianos, designed by Albert Schoenhut, were the company's first products. Various models were produced beginning in 1872 until 1935. O. Schoenhut, Inc. continued to make toy pianos into the twenty-first century.
