= Paul Peter Rao =

United States Judge (1899–1988)

Judge of the United States Court of International Trade
- In office November 1, 1980 – November 30, 1988
- Appointed by: operation of law
- Preceded by: Seat established by 94 Stat. 1727
- Succeeded by: Richard W. Goldberg

Chief Judge of the United States Customs Court
- In office 1965–1971
- Preceded by: Webster Oliver
- Succeeded by: Nils Boe

Judge of the United States Customs Court
- In office June 22, 1948 – November 1, 1980
- Appointed by: Harry S. Truman
- Preceded by: David Hayes Kincheloe
- Succeeded by: Seat abolished

Personal details
- Born: Paul Peter Rao; June 15, 1899 Prizzi, Italy
- Died: November 30, 1988 (aged 89) New York City, New York, U.S.
- Education: Fordham University School of Law (LLB)

Paul Peter Rao (June 15, 1899 – November 30, 1988) was a judge of the United States Court of International Trade.

== Education and career ==
Born on June 15, 1899, in Prizzi, Italy, Rao served in the United States Navy from 1917 to 1919. He received a Bachelor of Laws from the Fordham University School of Law in 1923. He served as an Assistant District Attorney for New York County from 1925 to 1927 before entering private practice, where he remained until 1941. In 1941, he was a candidate for Justice of the New York Supreme Court and was appointed Assistant Attorney General in charge of customs, a position he held until 1948.

== Federal judicial service ==
Rao received a recess appointment from President Harry S. Truman on June 22, 1948, to a seat on the United States Customs Court vacated by Judge David Hayes Kincheloe. He was nominated to the same position by President Truman on January 13, 1949. He was confirmed by the United States Senate on January 31, 1949, and received his commission on February 2, 1949. Rao was initially appointed as a Judge under Article I, but the court was raised to Article III status by operation of law on July 14, 1956, and Rao thereafter served as an Article III Judge. He served as Chief Judge from 1965 to 1971. Rao was reassigned by operation of law to the United States Court of International Trade on November 1, 1980, to a new seat authorized by 94 Stat. 1727. His service terminated on November 30, 1988, due to his death in New York City. He was succeeded by Judge Richard W. Goldberg.

== Sources ==
Legal offices
| Preceded by David Hayes Kincheloe | Judge of the United States Customs Court; 1948–1980 | Succeeded by Seat abolished |
| Preceded by Webster Oliver | Chief Judge of the United States Customs Court; 1965–1971 | Succeeded by Nils Boe |
| Preceded by Seat established by 94 Stat. 1727 | Judge of the United States Court of International Trade; 1980–1988 | Succeeded by Richard W. Goldberg |
