= George Emery Weller =

American judge

Judge of the United States Customs Court
- In office May 28, 1926 – September 30, 1930
- Appointed by: operation of law
- Preceded by: Seat established by 44 Stat. 669
- Succeeded by: David Hayes Kincheloe

Member of the Board of General Appraisers
- In office January 6, 1919 – May 28, 1926
- Appointed by: Woodrow Wilson
- Preceded by: Samuel B. Cooper
- Succeeded by: Seat abolished

Personal details
- Born: George Emery Weller; August 24, 1857 Saint Paul, Minnesota, U.S.
- Died: May 17, 1932 (aged 74) Atlantic City, New Jersey, U.S.
- Education: Columbia Law School (LL.B.)

George Emery Weller (August 24, 1857 – May 17, 1932) was a judge of the United States Customs Court and a member of the Board of General Appraisers.

== Education and career ==
Born on August 24, 1857, in Saint Paul, Minnesota, Weller received a Bachelor of Laws in 1889 from Columbia Law School. He entered private practice from 1889 to 1918 in New York City, New York.

== Federal Judicial Service ==
Weller was nominated by President Woodrow Wilson on December 3, 1918, to a seat on the Board of General Appraisers vacated by Samuel B. Cooper. He was confirmed by the United States Senate on January 3, 1919, and received his commission on January 6, 1919. Weller was reassigned by operation of law to the United States Customs Court on May 28, 1926, to a new Associate Justice seat (Judge seat from June 17, 1930) authorized by 44 Stat. 669. His service terminated on September 30, 1930, due to his retirement. He was succeeded by Judge David Hayes Kincheloe.

== Death ==
Hayes died on May 17, 1932, in Atlantic City, New Jersey.

== Sources ==
Legal offices
Preceded by Samuel B. Cooper	Member of the Board of General Appraisers; 1919–1926	Succeeded by Seat abolished
Preceded by Seat established by 44 Stat. 669	Judge of the United States Customs Court; 1926–1930	Succeeded by David Hayes Kincheloe
