= Tariff of 1883 =

Historical United States tariff

- Other short titles: Mongrel Tariff Act · Act of March 3, 1883
- Long title: An Act to reduce internal-revenue taxation, and for other purposes.
- Nicknames: The Mongrel Tariff
- Enacted by: the 47th United States Congress
- Effective: March 3, 1883

Citations
- Statutes at Large: 22 Stat. 488

Legislative history
- Introduced in the House as H.R. 5538 by R‑MI Jay Abel Hubbellth on May 1882; Committee consideration by House Committee on Ways and Means · Senate Committee on Finance; Passed the House on; Passed the Senate as the S. 2284 on February 20, 1883 (42–33); Reported by the joint conference committee on February–March 1883; agreed to by the House on March 3, 1883 (152–116 (agreed to conference report)) and by the Senate on March 3, 1883 (42–31 (agreed to conference report)); Signed into law by President Chester A. Arthur on March 3, 1883

United States Supreme Court cases
- Nix v. Hedden (1893)

In United States tax law history, the Tariff of 1883 (signed into law on March 3, 1883), also known as the Mongrel Tariff Act by its critics, reduced high tariff rates only marginally, and left in place fairly strong protectionist barriers.

President Chester A. Arthur appointed a commission in May 1882 to recommend how much tariff rates should be reduced. The issue was controversial during the last three decades of the nineteenth century, making tariff revision a daunting task. Different constituents argued for opposite measures, often wanting to maintain tariffs on some items while reducing them on others. Support or opposition to tariffs often broke down along regional lines.

In December 1882, the commission argued for substantial reductions. Protectionists in Congress by this time recognized that some type of reduction would be politically popular, but wanted to avoid a drastic cut. Lame-duck Republicans wanted to ensure that a tariff reduction passed before incumbent Democrats assumed control of Congress in the next session and lowered rates by a greater margin.

The result was an enormously complicated and unpopular piece of legislation with no clear vision. Tariffs on some items were lowered. Others were inexplicably raised. Some goods had multiple tariffs rates placed on them to be applied in different locations with no clear reasoning. Tariff rates were reduced an average 1.47 percent, with most rates remaining around 35–40 percent.

President Arthur was not the most enthusiastic supporter of tariff reduction, but he did feel that some meaningful reduction was needed and he recognized that the changes made by the "Mongrel Tariff" were insufficient. Thus, he directed U.S. Secretary of State Frederick Theodore Frelinghuysen to establish reciprocal trade agreements with other nations, especially those with raw material the U.S. needed. The reciprocal trade agreements allowed Arthur to amend the tariff without having to involve himself in a congressional battle over the issue.

== Nix v. Hedden ==
The law exempts fruit but not vegetables, causing tomato importers to file suit claiming that tomatoes are a fruit, resulting in the unanimous U.S. Supreme Court decision in Nix v. Hedden (May 10, 1893) that tomatoes are to be considered a vegetable for purposes of this tariff.
