= Sports figurine =

Collectible models of athletes

- Sports figurine of football player Howie Long by McFarlane Toys
- Type: Figurine
- Invented by: Hartland
- Company: McFarlane; Rosko Industries
- Country: United States
- Availability: 1958–present
- Materials: Plastic resin; Composite; Rubber
- Features: Athletes

A sports figurine is a collectible statue of a professional athlete, usually made of plastic. Sports figurines come packaged with a stand which they can be connected to. When a series of figurines of five to seven different athletes are released at a time, they usually consist of the more popular players and well known household names. These figurines are highly collectible with some being sold in limited quantities labeled as "limited edition". The limited edition figures have the athletes wearing different attire than a more common model, and are much harder to obtain and fetch a larger price. A common figurine has a starting price of $20 with a rarer one costing upwards of $80.

They are a step up from cards with athletes on them because of the fact they represent a 3d model of an athlete rather than a 2d image. Not to be confused with a bobblehead, sports figurines present a more serious manner in which the athlete the model is representing is performing an action commonly used in real sports such as a slam dunk, slap shot, etc.

According to an article from the St. Louis Bi-State Region Report, the popularity of sports figurines continues to grow.

== History ==
Hartland is the most well known company of making and selling sports figurines. Hartland was founded in 1941 and was the first company to manufacture licensed sports figurines. The first series they produced was the 900 series in 1958, using mold-injected acetate plastic resin. The figures were then hand painted using an acetate-based paint. Hartland Plastics has been producing pieces of Sports memorabilia since the 1950s. In the first five years of production, Hartland made 18 statues of MLB players.

In the years since, sports action figures have been produced using hard plastic, rubber, composite materials, and even cloth and wood. Some are designed as static figurines similar to small statues while others are designed to twist, bend, and move their torsos and limbs just as a real athlete would. Many sports action figures feature intricate details, faithfully recreating the look and feel of the athletes’ uniforms, caps, equipment such as bats, gloves, or hockey sticks, and even their facial features.

== Johnny Hero ==
The earliest sports figurine most popularly known was Johnny Hero in the year 1965, just a year after G.I. Joe; the figure had silk track shorts and short-sleeve shirt with trim (piping) and was produced by Rosko Industries of New York. Unlike today, figurines back then came with removable clothing. Kids could change the attire of Johnny Hero to any team they preferred. These figurines were first offered in SEARS catalogs during 1955 and 1956.

In 1968 Johnny Hero was repackaged as Olympic Hero. The base figure was sold in a box similar to the GI Joe figures of the time. His base outfit included a red long-sleeve jogging suit (the top had "Johnny Hero" and the number 16 printed on the front), gold shorts, white socks and white tennis shoes. NFL, AFL and MLB team uniforms were sold separately. NFL / AFL uniforms included fabric jerseys and pants, shoulder and knee pads, socks, a football and a plastic helmet. Baseball uniforms included shirt, pants, socks, hat, baseball, bat and glove. Johnny Hero is well known enough today that he has his own Facebook Page.“Anecdotal research and subjective inquiry have been aided by secondary research to demonstrate consistency of information and opinion on this subject.”
