= Golly =

Golly may refer to:

== Fictional characters ==
- Golliwogg, a black character in 19th-century children's books
- Golly, a cartoon character in the 2006 live action/animated film Re-Animated
- Golly Mackenzie, a fictional character in the 2000–2005 British TV series Monarch of the Glen
- Ole Golly, a fictional supporting character in the children's book Harriet the Spy and 2021 animated show.

== Other ==
- Golly (program), open-source software for simulating cellular automata
- Golly, Wrexham, a location in Wales
- Golly! Ghost!, a video game
- Golly Bar, an ice cream snack
- Golly Pond, a body of water in Heaton Park, Greater Manchester, England
- Richard Goleszowski, an English animator

== See also ==
- Betcha by Golly, Wow
- Good Golly Miss Molly
