= Carrot knife =

Toy resembling a pocket knife

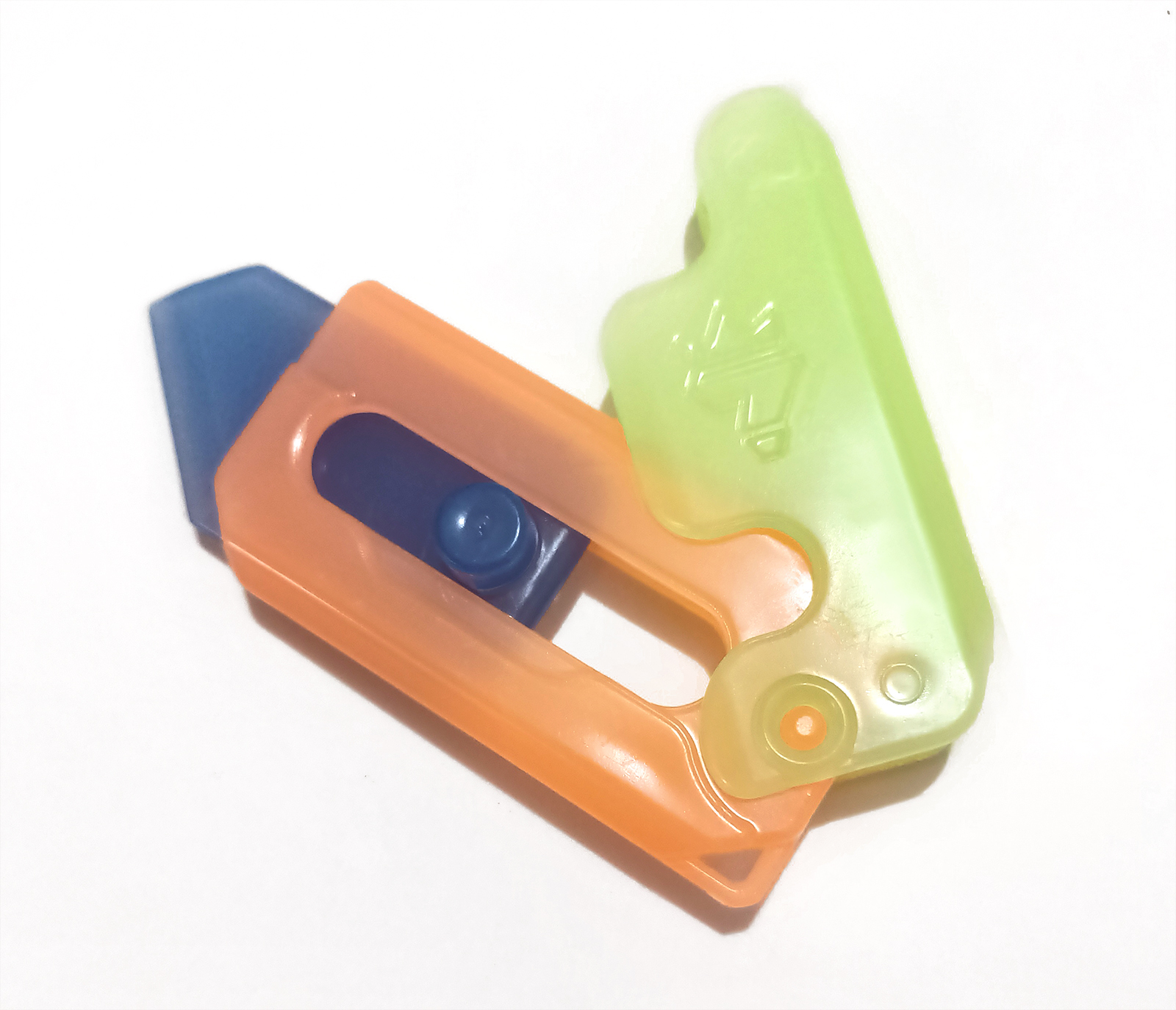
- Type: Stress-relieving toy
- Invented by: Zhou Wenhao (Crazy Question Mark 493)
- Country: China
- Availability: 2022–present
- Materials: Plastic

The carrot knife, (Chinese: 萝卜刀) also known as a radish knife, is a toy launched in 2022 which resembles a pocketknife with blunt plastic parts.

== Background ==
The carrot knife is a toy typically made of soft plastic and has retractable and foldable parts. The whole toy resembles the shape of a carrot. While it is made of blunt plastic it resembles the mechanism of a spring-action knife or a pocketknife.

The toy is intended as a stress-reliever for teenagers, similar to the fidget spinner.

== History ==
The toy was conceptualized by a Beijing-born 3D-printing artist Zhou Wenhao who is known online as Crazy Question Mark 493 (Chinese: 疯狂的问号493). He is a student at a university in Wuhan.

In June 2022, Wenhao came up with the concept for the carrot knife, and dubbed it as Zhònglì yòu zǎi xiǎo luóbo (Chinese: 重力幼崽小萝卜, lit. 'Gravity Cub Radish'). He posted an 8-second video on his Bilibili account and was viewed by 1 million people, becoming viral. He would share the designs publicly but labeled it as "not for commercial use".

In July 2023, he would post a video on Douyin about the toy which garnered 5 million views overnight. Several third-party manufacturers also began to sell the toy which eventually became known as the carrot knife.

== Safety and violence ==
Schools in South Korea, Taiwan and mainland China has explicitly prohibited students from bringing carrot knives to school and has discouraged their parents to purchase the toy for their children.

Concerns were raised that the toy might encourage violence since the toy is often used to simulate stabbings.

== See also ==
- Natasha doll
