= Topsy-Turvy doll =

Toy doll featuring two different characters

A Topsy-Turvy doll is a double-ended doll, typically featuring two opposing characters. They are traditionally American cloth folk dolls which fuse a white girl child with a black girl child at the hips. Later dolls were sometimes a white girl child with a black mammy figure. Precise facts about their origins are rare, but as late as the 1950s, "Topsy and Eva" dolls were marketed by Sears, Montgomery Ward, and The Babyland Rag company (aka Bruckner).

== Meaning and use ==
As objects of material culture, Topsy-Turvy dolls have provoked a great amount of interpretive controversy. Karen Sanchez-Eppler suspects that Harriet Beecher Stowe's Topsy in Uncle Tom's Cabin may have taken her name from the dolls, making for a "poignant and somewhat disturbing pairing with little Eva".

Doll collector Wendy Lavitt writes, "It has recently been suggested that these dolls were often made for Black children who desired a forbidden white doll (a baby like the ones their mothers cared for); they would flip the doll to the black side when an overseer passed them at play." Alice Taylor echoes this idea. “Scholars and doll enthusiasts continue to speculate about their original purpose and how children would have used them. The dolls likely were produced for slave children and perhaps as 'maid dolls' for white children. The issue of how children played with these dolls remains hotly debated”.

Kimberly Wallace-Sanders addresses the controversial question of the possible meanings and uses behind the doll's design in her social history of the image and myth of the Southern mammy figure. She writes:

African American slave women may have given dolls like these to their daughters as a preparation for a possibility of a life devoted to nurturing two babies: one black and one white. Topsy-turvy dolls are designed for children to play with one baby at a time, and this accurately reflects the division of caregiving that African American women encountered, having to care for white children during the day and their own children at night. These handmade dolls are important, creative expressions of those otherwise silent women we know only as "mammy."

Wallace-Sanders also disagrees with the "forbidden white doll" theory, arguing that the idea of a secret doll that would be forbidden to own makes Black mothers seem extremely irresponsible.

Topsy-Turvy dolls

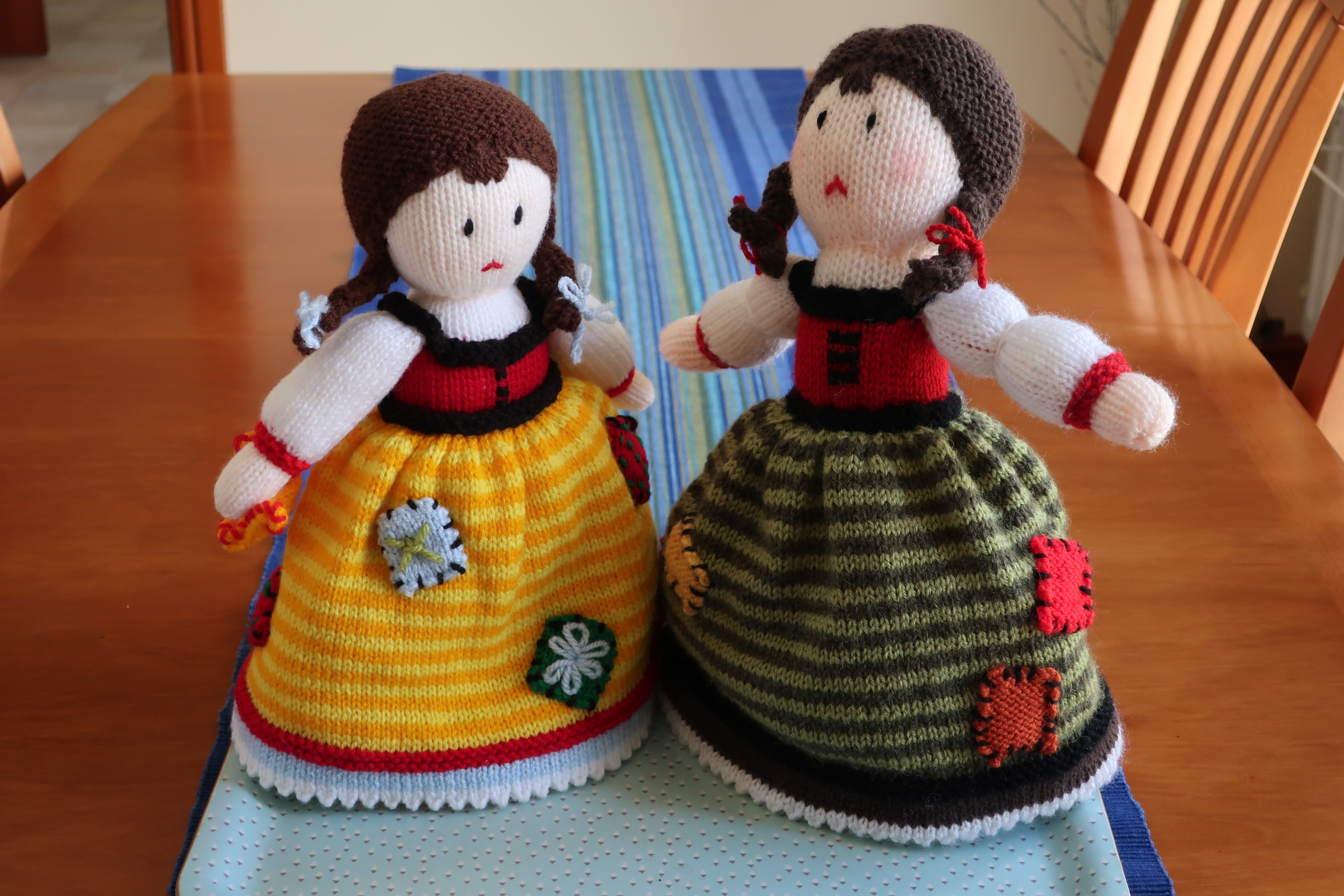
A pair of Cinderellas dressed as servants

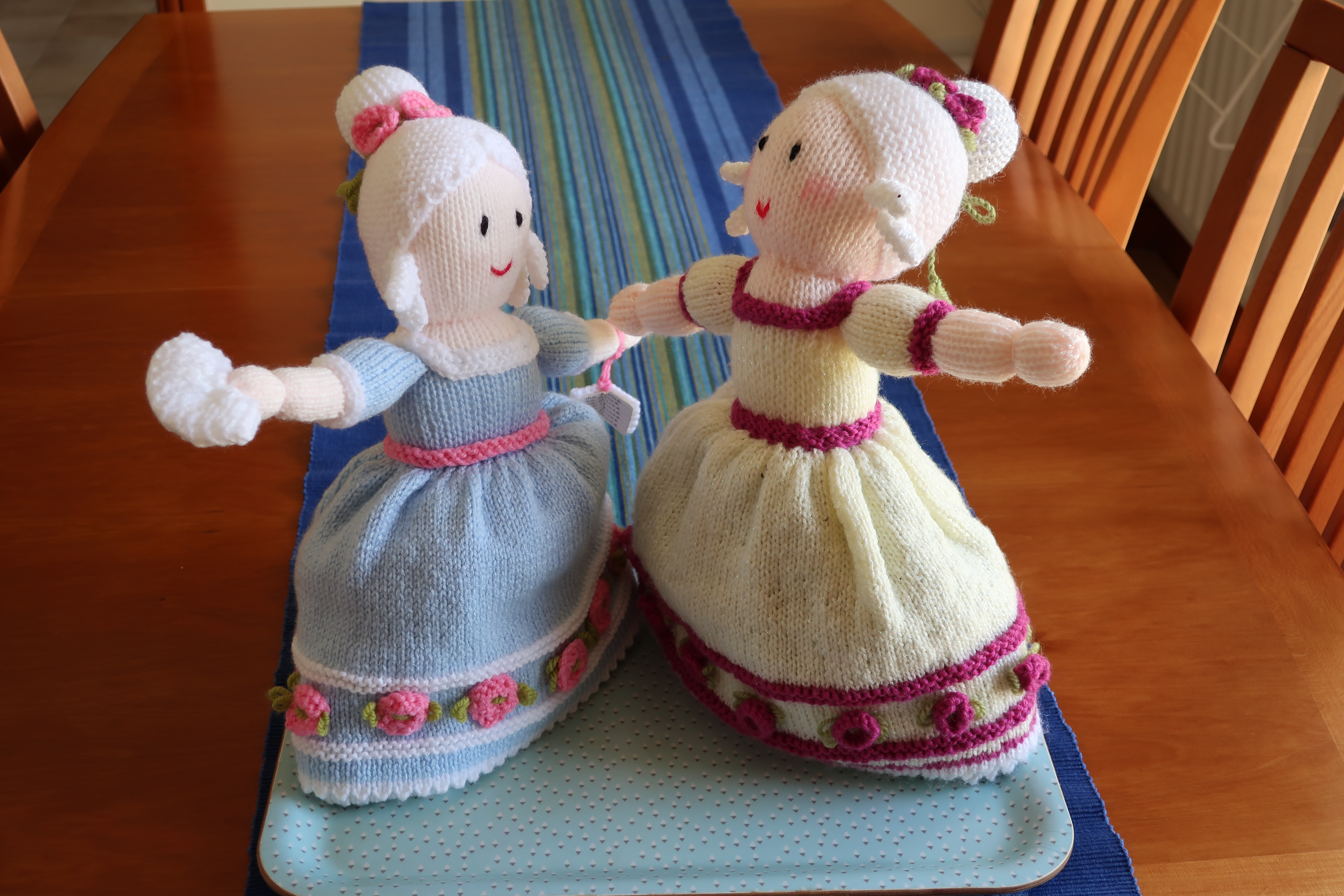
A pair of Cinderellas ready for a ball

== Collections and museums ==
Many Topsy-Turvy style dolls can be found in the Hatch Collection of Black Cloth Dolls. Another in a red checked apron, "called a double ender because of the two opposite heads", is on view at the Philadelphia Doll Museum.

== See also ==
- Black doll
- Three Orphan Kittens
