= Action Construction Equipment =

Indian construction equipment company pvt ltd

Action Construction Equipment Ltd.
- Trade name: ACE
- Formerly: Action Construction Equipments Private Limited (1995–2005); Action Construction Equipments Limited (2005–2006)
- Type: Public Company
- Traded as: BSE: 532762; NSE: ACE
- Industry: Heavy Equipment
- Founded: 1995
- Founder: Vijay Aggarwal
- Headquarters: Faridabad, India
- Area served: Worldwide
- Key people: Vijay Agarwal (Chairman & Managing Director); Mona Agarwal (Whole Time Director); Sorab Agarwal (Executive Director)
- Products: crawler cranes, concrete placing booms, bulldozers, mobile tower crane, tractors, pick and carry cranes, hydra cranes, articulated boom crane, mobile crane, telehandler, nextgen pick and carry cranes, new generation crane, farana crane, truck mounted crane, lorry loader crane, straight boom lift crane, articulated boom crane, backhoe loaders, aerial work platform awp, forklift trucks, piling rigs, vibratory rollers, tower cranes, road equipment, motor grader, warehousing equipment, Agri equipment
- Revenue: ₹ 3,320.32 Cr
- Number of employees: 1492 (31 March 2025)
- Website: www.ace-cranes.com

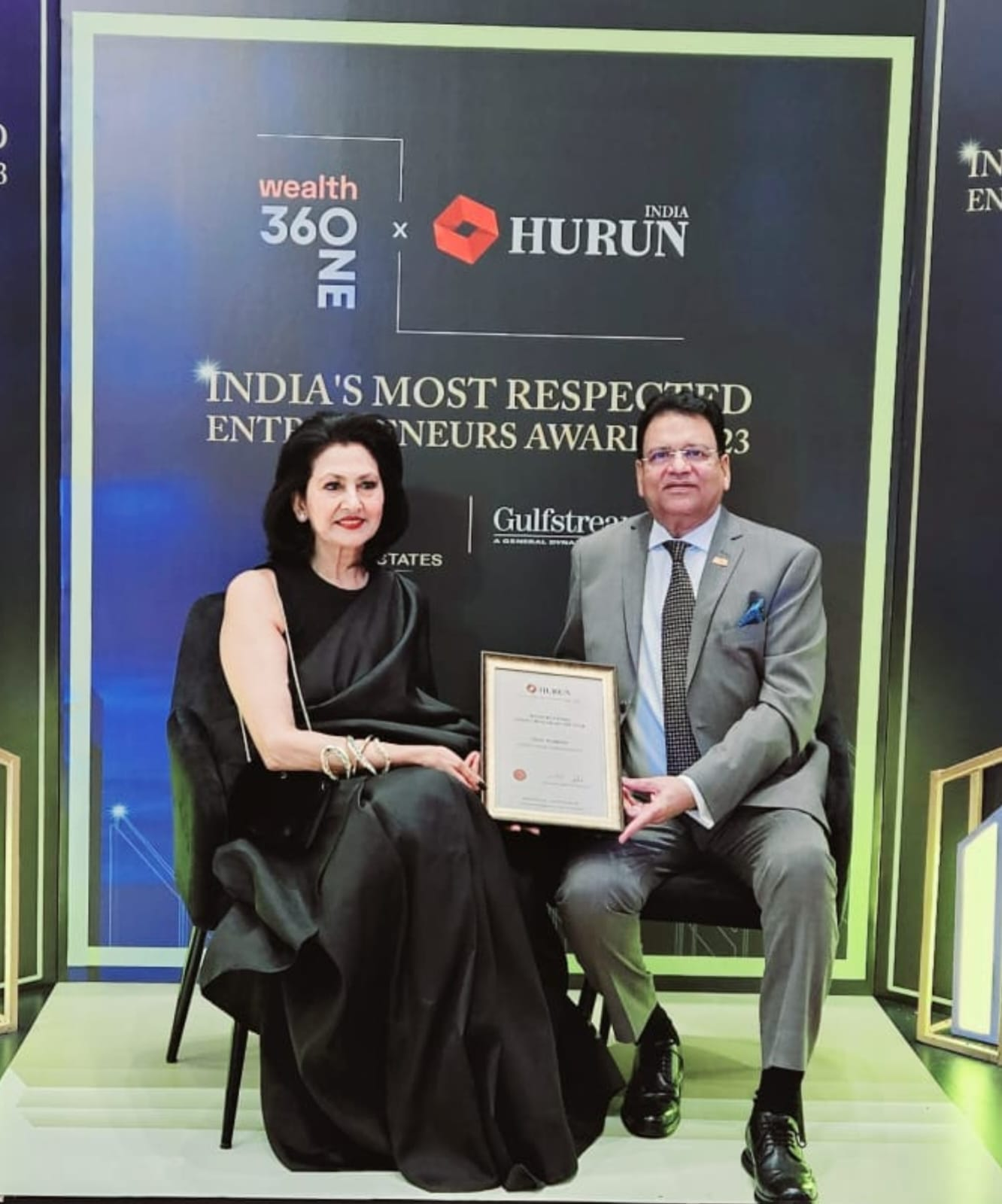
Vijay Agarwal (CMD - ACE Ltd.) & Mona Agarwal

Action Construction Equipment Ltd. is an Indian material handling and construction equipment manufacturing company, incorporated in 1995.

The company has eight manufacturing sites in Faridabad, Haryana, with a research and development in Faridabad district, and has a manufacturing capacity of 12000 construction equipment and 9000 tractors annually. Their product portfolio is divided into four main categories: agricultural equipment, construction equipment, road construction equipment, and earth-moving machinery, mainly catering to Asia-Pacific, Africa and Latin America regions.

In 2019, the company was ranked at #223 in Fortune magazine's "Next 500" list of midsized Indian companies.

== Ventures and Acquisitions ==
In 2001, ACE partnered up with Autogru PM a Modena based Italian crane manufacturer. The partnership gave ACE exclusive distribution rights for their products in India

In 2006, ACE and Tigieffe, an Italy based aerial platform manufacturer, under the name Airo, started a 60:40 joint venture. The new ventures plant was based in Faridabad, which will serve the nation for new products.

ACE acquired 89% of Forma S.A., a Romania based tractor manufacturer, in 2008. After the acquisition, ACE rolled out products with the ACE-Forma name. The same year, the company partnered with a Chinese crane manufacturer based in Hunan. To sell crawler cranes jointly in India.

In year 2016, Action Construction Equipment got into the concrete pump business with partnering with Turkish leader Boom Makina a Istanbul based concrete pump manufacturer. The partnership gave ACE exclusive rights to import and sell Boom Makina's equipment under its own brand name.

ACE and URSUS S.A., a Polish tractor manufacturer, signed an MoU in 2018 to localize their new range of tractors for India. This new line was based in Massey Ferguson tractors.

ACE and KATO, a Japan based crane manufacturer, formed a 50:50 joint venture in 2026. This newly formed venture, ACE-KATO, built a plant in Haryana where the company will manufacture various types of cranes for energy and infrastructure projects.

== Timeline ==
- 1995 – company incorporated, rolled out its first hydraulic mobile crane
- 1997 – received ISO 9001:2008 certification; established regional office in Mumbai
- 1998 – rolled out first mobile tower crane
- 1999 – rolled out its first small Loader; exported its first machine
- 2004 – sold first tower crane and began developing fixed tower cranes
- 2005 – The company becomes public limited company and name was change Action Construction Equipments Private Limited to Action Construction Equipments Ltd. on October 4, 2005.
- 2007 – launched forklift truck; became first Indian construction equipment manufacturer to be accorded CE marking; approved acquisition of a Romanian company by its Cyprus-based subsidiary, Frested Ltd.
- 2009 – designed, developed and launched road making equipment
- 2010 – Indigenous production of big Tower Cranes.
- 2011 – launch of in-house R&D center; in-house manufacturing of crawler cranes
- 2012 – launched new generation pick and carry cranes, lorry loaders, and higher-capacity tower cranes
- 2013 – started in-house engine plant; launched Free of Cost 24 x 7 ambulance service for the areas of Palwal and Faridabad Districts.
- 2014 – launched wheel harvester
- 2015 – launched rotavator and other agricultural implements
- 2017 – launched tractor range of up to 90 HP
- 2018 – launched AX124 backhoe loader for export market; ACE partnered with Punjab National Bank for farm machinery financing.
- 2019 – launched NX-series Multi Activity Crane at Bauma Conexpo, India Launched NX360° slew-cum-pick and carry crane from Tara Chand Logistics, Mumbai

== Products ==
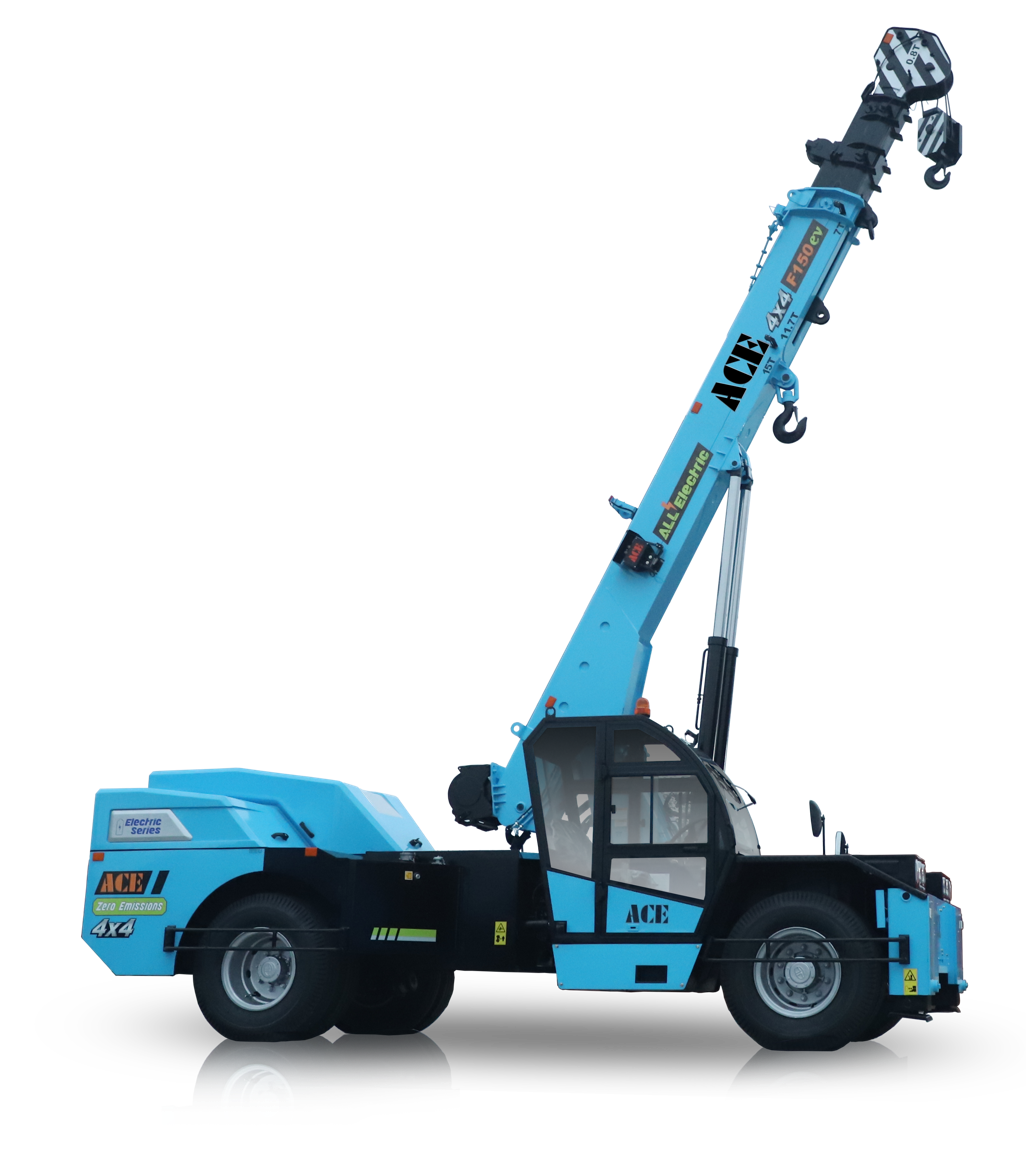
- India's 1st Electric Crane F150ev
  Mobile crane
- Truck mounted crane
- Crawler crane
- Rough tarrain crane
- Forklift
- Telescopic handler
- Aerial work platform
- Tower crane
- Concrete pump
- Piling rig
- Backhoe loader
- Motor grader
- Road roller
- Pallet jack
- Dock leveler
- Tractor
- Combine harvester

== Awards and recognition ==
- ICICI, CNBC-TV18 Emerging India Awards 2005-2006
- India's Best Company of the Year Award 2018 by Berkshire Media Pvt. Ltd. (A Division of Berkshire Media LLC, USA)
- Dream Companies to Work for - Construction Sector, 16 February 2019
- Award for Brand Excellence- Construction Equipment Industry ACE- National Brand Leadership Congress & Awards 2019
- Best Training Initiative Award (Infrastructure Sector) in National Award For Excellence in Training & Development 2019
- North India Best Employer Brand Award - 13th Employer Branding Awards 2018
- India's Top Challengers Award - 16th Construction World Global Awards-2018
- Best Seller in Mobile Cranes Category Award - 6th Equipment India-2018
- Best Seller in Mobile Cranes Category Award-5th Equipment India-2018
- Associate Partner in India's Top Challengers Award-Construction World-2017
- India's Most Trusted Company Award-IBC, USA-2017
- "70 Most Trusted Power Brands of India" Award-2017
- Economic Times "Infra Focus" Award-2017.
- Best Seller in Mobile Cranes Category Award-4th Equipment India-2017
- Construction World-2006, 2007, 2008, 2011, and 2012
