= Florence Kate Upton =

American-English cartoonist and author (1873–1922)

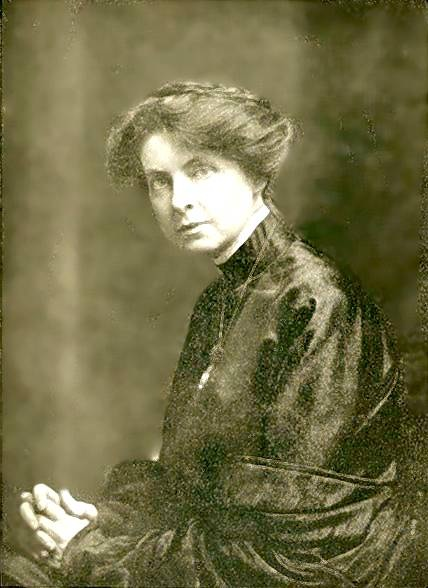
Florence Kate Upton, circa 1895

Florence Kate Upton (22 February 1873 – 16 October 1922) was an American-born British cartoonist and author most famous for creating the Golliwog character, featured in a series of children's books.

== Early life ==
Upton was born in Flushing, New York, to English parents who had immigrated to the United States. She was the second of four children in a creative and slightly eccentric household.

Florence's father, Thomas Harborough Upton, worked as a confidential clerk at the American Exchange Bank in New York. In 1884, the family moved from Flushing to central Manhattan, which was more convenient for her father's daily journey to his office. The National Academy of Design, located near the new home, offered free instruction to anyone who could qualify. This prompted her father to enroll in evening classes, and Florence, at 15 years old, joined him for the beginning of her formal art training.

== Early career ==
In June 1889, the family was placed in financial difficulty by the sudden death of Thomas Upton. Florence's mother, Bertha Upton, had a trained singing voice and began to give voice lessons in the home. Her older sister, Ethelwyn, found work, while her younger siblings, Alice and Desmond, remained in school. At age 16, Florence obtained work as a professional illustrator. Numerous illustrated magazines existed at this time, mainly as vehicles for advertising and light fiction of varying merit. Some of the authors who wrote for the magazines employed Florence to illustrate their novels or books of short stories.

By 1893, the Upton family's finances had stabilised to such a degree that they were able to pay an extended visit to Bertha's relatives, the Hudsons, who lived in the Hampstead area of London. With an established reputation from her published work in New York, Florence had no difficulty in finding employment with London publishers. When the rest of the family returned to the United States, she opted to stay in England and began experimenting with ideas to supplement her income so that she could afford further art training.

== Golliwogg ==
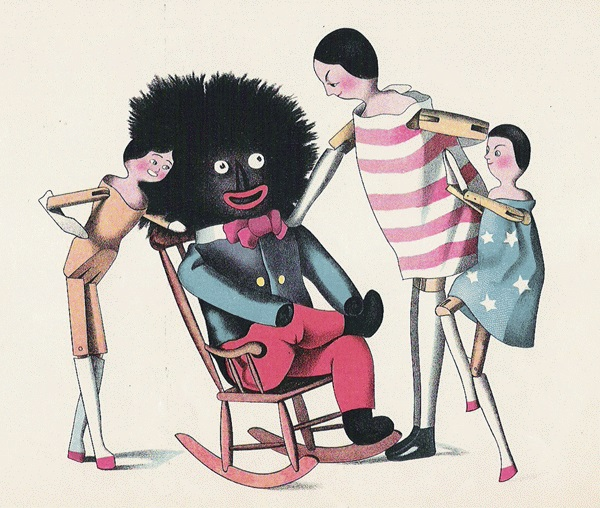
Illustration for The Adventures of Two Dutch Dolls and a "Golliwogg", 1895

Upton began to sketch out ideas for a children's book, using "penny wooden" dolls as her models. However, without a central character on which to hang the tale, progress came to a standstill.

However, Upton found a toy from her childhood which completed the trio, Golliwogg of whom she said "Tracing him back to as near the beginning as I can get, he came from an American Fair."

The name Upton said, came to her out of the blue. "As the Golliwogg has always seemed to me to be telling me his own biography, so in the same way he must have told me his own name, for one day, when the pictures were about half completed, and the verses not yet begun, I picked him up from the table in my studio, and without intention of naming him, without the idea of a name passing through my mind, I called him "Golliwogg."

This toy, which she named "Golliwogg", provided inspiration, and the first story was completed in 1894. After the manuscript was rejected by several publishing houses, John William Allen of Longmans, Green & Co. took it home and read it to his children. Their enthusiastic response prompted Allen to advocate for its publication, and Longmans offered Upton a contract. The Adventures of Two Dutch Dolls was published for Christmas 1895, with the title updated to The Adventures of Two Dutch Dolls and a "Golliwogg" in the second printing.

During her stay in London, Upton provided illustrations for The Strand Magazine, The Idler and Punch. The American Society in London also commissioned a series of drawings and cartoons to decorate the souvenir programme of their November 1896 Thanksgiving Banquet. In 1895, she studied art at Croydon under Walter Wallis. She gave him a copy of her book, which was later given to his grandchildren; its present whereabouts are unknown. After three years of work, she returned to New York to attend the Art Students League, then continued studies in Paris and the Netherlands. Returning to London in 1906 to take up permanent residence, she moved to 21 Great College Street in 1910.

Through the years, Florence and Bertha collaborated on thirteen Golliwogg adventures, with Bertha writing the verse and Florence providing the illustrations. The complete Golliwogg series comprises the following titles:

- The Adventures of Two Dutch Dolls. London: Longmans, Green & Co. (1895).
- The Golliwogg’s Bicycle Club. London: Longmans, Green & Co. (1896).
- The Golliwogg at the Sea-side. London: Longmans, Green & Co. (1898).
- The Golliwogg in War! London: Longmans, Green & Co. (1899).
- The Golliwogg’s Polar Adventures. London: Longmans, Green & Co. (1900).
- The Golliwogg's "Auto-Go-Cart." London: Longmans, Green & Co. (1901) New York, London and Bombay.
- The Golliwogg's Air-ship. London: Longmans, Green & Co. (1902).
- The Golliwogg's Circus. London: Longmans, Green & Co. (1903).
- The Golliwogg in Holland. London: Longmans, Green & Co. (1904).
- The Golliwogg’s Fox-hunt. London: Longmans, Green & Co. (1905).
- The Golliwogg’s Desert-Island. London: Longmans, Green & Co. (1906).
- The Golliwogg’s Christmas. London: Longmans, Green & Co. (1907).
- Golliwogg in the African Jungle. London: Longmans, Green & Co. (1909).

The two also created a card game featuring illustrations from the series called Golliwogg: A Round Game in 1900, produced by De La Rue & Co. Ltd. of London.

Over the years, public interest in the series waned, and Florence focused on her career as a professional artist. The last of the books was published in 1909. Upton continued to study and paint, concentrating mainly on portraits. She exhibited at the Royal Academy and other prominent venues and rapidly established a reputation as an accomplished society portraitist. Additionally, she received hundreds of commissions from the families of young soldiers.

For health reasons, Upton was found unfit to serve in any physical capacity during the First World War. She aided the war effort by donating her original dolls and drawings to a fund-raising auction for the Red Cross, conducted by Christie's in 1917. The sale of the dolls, which, as a lot, fetched 450 guineas, funded the purchase of an ambulance: it was christened "Golliwogg" and served at the front in France.

== Death ==
At the age of 49, Upton died in her studio on 16 October 1922, from complications following surgery. She is buried in Hampstead Cemetery.

== Legacy ==
The original Golliwogg and Dutch Dolls were, for many years, at Chequers, the Prime Minister's country estate in Buckinghamshire. They are now at the V&A Museum of Childhood in Bethnal Green, London.

The Golliwogg had a considerable impact at the height of its popularity. Florence Upton's friend and biographer, Edith Lyttelton, recollected, "One of my children, long before we knew who Bertha and Florence Upton were, had a passionate attachment to the doll stories, and a new Golliwogg book was a great excitement in my nursery as in countless others."

Upton did not copyright or trademark the character. Recognising a large and profitable market, many toy companies took advantage of the popularity of the books and manufactured versions of the doll, while other writers and illustrators took equal advantage, many changing the nature of the series. In 1910, John Robertson of the jam manufacturing family James Robertson & Sons decided it should be the company's mascot, which it remained until 2002.

The prolific Enid Blyton depicted golliwogs in a number of her stories as naughty individuals, although Mr Golly the garage owner was a pillar of Toytown society. Other authors took a similar tack. The naughty Noddy golliwogs were later replaced with goblins or other characters, and Mr Golly with Mr Sparks, a doll (though by Monsieur Polly on the 1975-6 ITV stop-motion series).

The name "golliwog" came to be used as a degrading term for anyone who was not white-skinned, and new origins were suggested for the word. Upton despaired: "I am frightened when I read the fearsome etymology some deep, dark minds can see in his name."
