= Shindana Toys =

California cooperative toy company known for making black dolls

- Type: Toy company
- Founded: 1968 in Los Angeles
- Founders: Louis S. Smith, II and Robert Hall
- Defunct: 1983
- Headquarters: Los Angeles, United States

Shindana Toys, a division of Operation Bootstrap, Inc., was a South Central Los Angeles, California cooperative toy company in business from 1968 to 1983. It was launched as a black empowerment and community rejuvenation effort following the Watts riots. Company proceeds supported businesses in the Watts area. Named after the Swahili word roughly meaning "to compete," Shindana Toys was community-owned and founded by Louis S. Smith, II and Robert Hall. The latter was the company's first CEO and President; though he was succeeded in both posts by Smith. The Chase Manhattan Bank, the Mattel Toy Company, Sears Roebuck & Co., and Equitable Life Assurance helped finance portions of the Shindana Toys operations.

Shindana Toys was historically significant for being one of the first toy companies to market ethnically correct black dolls. A goal of the company was to raise black consciousness and improve self-image. In a 1970s Los Angeles Associated Press article, company president, Louis Smith said, "We believe that only by learning to love oneself can one learn to love others... Shindana believes that by marketing black dolls and games that both black and white children can learn to relate to at an early age, the company can foster the spirit of what Shindana is all about, love."

From a shop on Vermont Avenue, Los Angeles, California, Doris Conner—an African American, entrepreneurial businesswoman—along with her daughters, Lynne and Tuesday Conner, created, designed, and manufactured many of the clothes worn by Shindana Dolls. They also manufactured the Flip Wilson doll.

The first doll created by Shindana Toys was named Baby Nancy. Many later Shindana Toys dolls featured ethnically correct names, including names that were Swahili in origin. Operation Bootstrap contracted with Mattel Toymakers to create a talking voice unit, just like the one invented for Chatty Cathy in 1960, for their doll Tamu in 1971. The popular Talking Tamu (Swahili for "sweet") doll was designed to say the following 11 phrases when you pulled her "talking ring":

- My name is Tamu.
- Cool it, baby.
- Do you like my dress?
- Hold me tight.
- I'm sleepy.
- Can you dig it?
- Let's play house.
- I love you.
- Tamu means 'sweet'.
- I'm hungry.
- I'm proud, like you.

Tamu was featured in the Sears Roebuck, JC Penney, and Montgomery Wards Christmas catalogs, and available in most stores where ever toys were sold.

Thanks in part to its acquisition of a company that produced board games, Shindana also started distributing games. These games included titles like "Jackson 5ive Action Game," "The Black Experience," "The Afro-American History Mystery Game," "Captain Soul," and "The Learning Tree."

== Popular Shindana Doll Lines ==
=== Baby Nancy ===
Launched in 1968, Baby Nancy was the first American doll to feature natural hair and Afrocentric features. By Thanksgiving, it was the best selling black doll in Los Angeles and was being sold across the country by Christmas, showing that there was demand for black dolls. The design of the doll was of note due to the work of sculptor Jim Toatley who created an ethnically representative mold, fulfilling Louis S. Smith's wish that the doll not simply be a white model painted black. The doll was inducted into National Toy Hall of Fame in 2020 alongside Jenga and sidewalk chalk.

=== Black Celebrity Dolls ===
Shindana dolls were created with the likenesses of positive Black celebrities, including Flip Wilson, Rodney Allen Rippy, Jimmie Walker (these were pull string talking dolls like Tamu), Julius Erving (a.k.a. Dr. J.), O. J. Simpson, Marla Gibbs, Redd Foxx, Diana Ross, and Michael Jackson. Children could make some of these dolls "talk" by pulling and releasing a string.

=== Cuddly Li'l Souls ===
This line featured "soft cloth-body rag dolls with natural-style hair" and clothing imprinted with uplifting phrases like "Peace," "Right On," "I'm Proud, Say It Loud", and "Learn, baby, learn." The last phrase was a transformation of the "Burn, baby, burn" chants heard during the Watts Riots. These dolls were given name like "Sis," "Natra," "Wilky," and "Coochy." The 1971 Sears Wish Book priced these dolls between $1.89 and $2.19.

=== Little Friends Collection ===
This collection featured Black, Caucasian, Asian, and Hispanic boys and girls—most about 12 inches tall and with attention given to ethnic details.

=== Career Girl, Wanda ===
"Each of Wanda's boxes included a little pamphlet explaining the doll's particular profession. Photos of real Black women in these professions and their comments about the nature of their jobs gave suggestions on what the child might do to learn more about the job." Some of Wanda's careers included nurse, skydiver/race car driver, tennis player, and singer.
