= Puckridge (automobile) =

Australian cyclecar from 1904

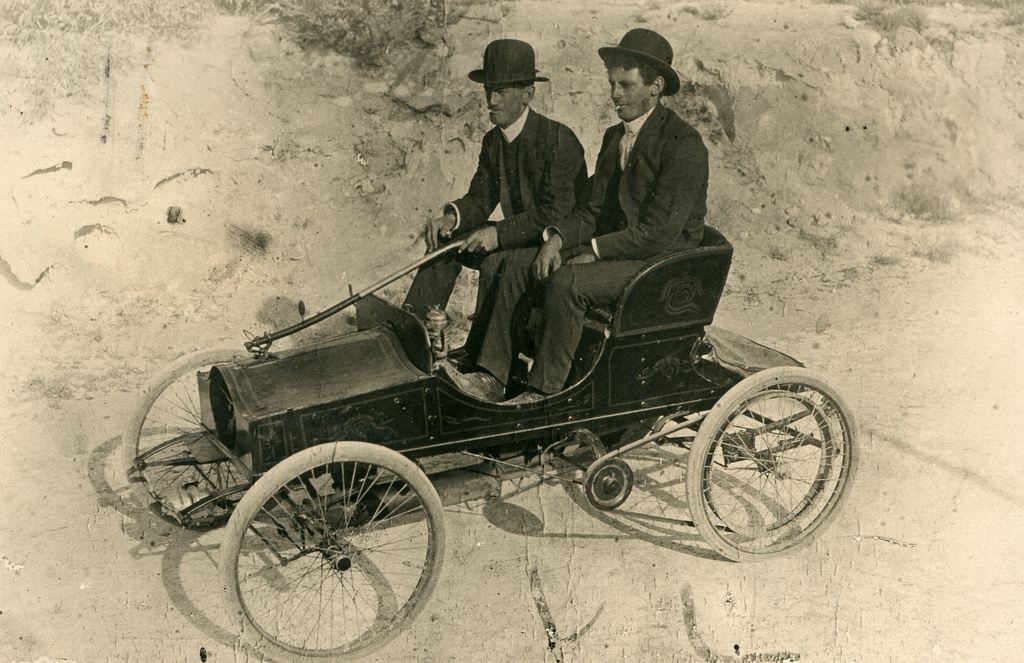
Puckrdige cyclecar

The Puckridge is a cyclecar built in 1904 in Port Lincoln, South Australia by bicycle maker F. B. Puckridge. Puckridge used as the basis for his vehicle a three-wheeler owned by his neighbour, a Dr. Kinmont. Kinmont had been injured when the three-wheeler toppled over on a bend and wanted a more stable vehicle.

Puckridge took the three-wheeler apart and built a four-wheel vehicle, using the original 2.75 hp single-cylinder De Dion engine. He added a two-speed belt-drive transmission, tiller steering, gas lighting, and fan cooling. An unusual feature was the starter system, which involved pulling a chain through a hole in the floorboards to rotate the engine.
