= White Hart, Grays =

Grade II listed public house in Essex, England

Coordinates: 51.4740°N 0.3225°E

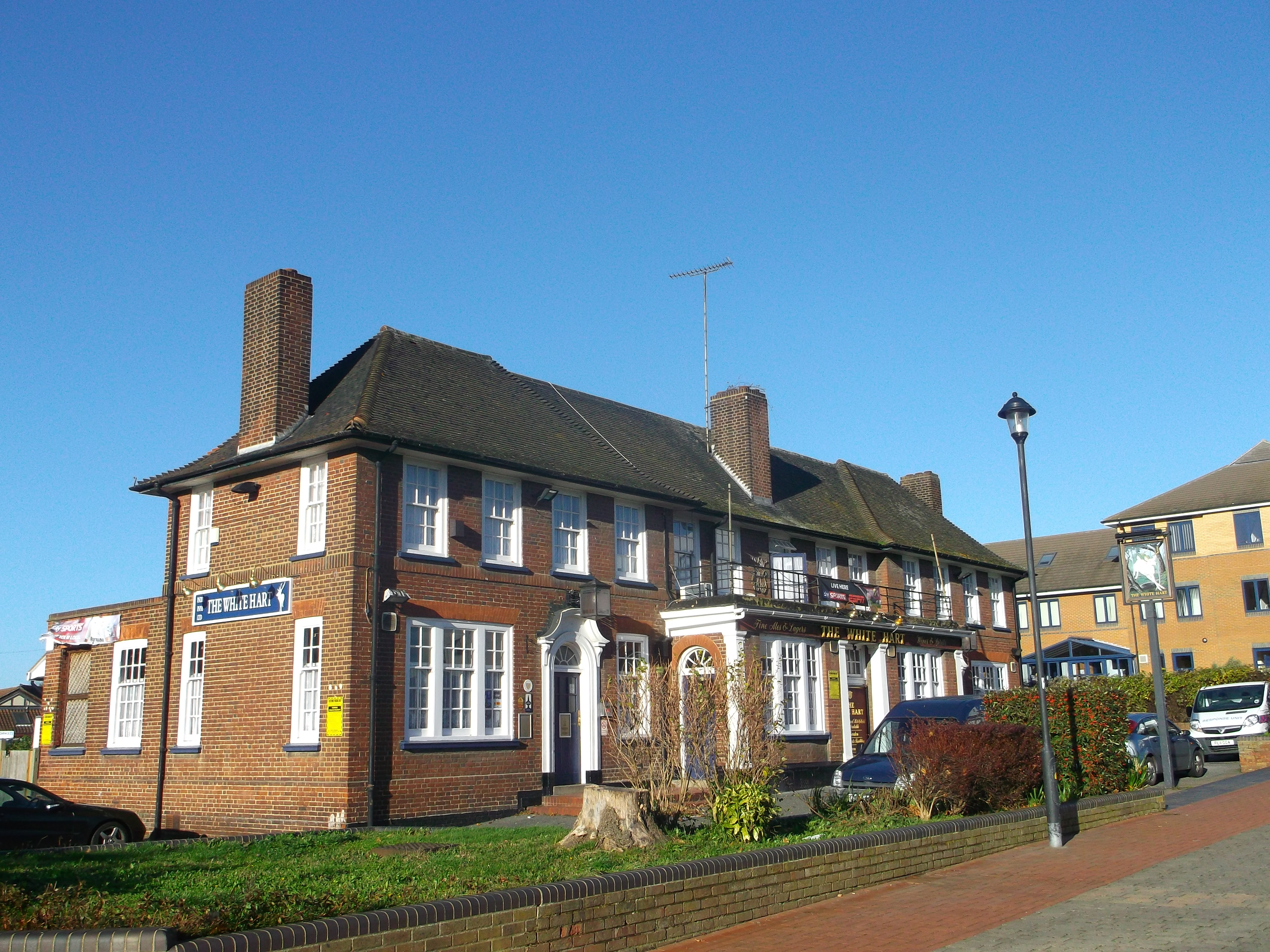
The White Hart

The White Hart is a Grade II listed pub at Kings Walk, Grays, Essex, RM17 6HR.

It was built in 1938 for Charringtons Brewery and replaced an 18th-century building of the same name. The architect is believed to be Edward Fincham. The bar is considered by some to be haunted.

It was Grade II listed in 2015 by Historic England. The pub is currently closed and seeking new management.

== Golliwog controversy ==
In February 2018 an investigation into the pub was held by Thurrock Council after a complaint was made against the display of golliwog dolls around the pub. The pub was raided by police in April 2023 after a further complaint about its provocative collection. The landlord, Christopher Ryley, was defiant despite national media coverage. Ryley's wife stated that neither she or her husband were racists, and that despite reports that her husband had been seen wearing a Britain First shirt, he was not a supporter of that party. The Conservative Home Secretary Suella Braverman described the raid as a waste of police resources.

The Campaign for Real Ale announced that the pub would no longer be eligible for consideration for its awards, and removed the pub from its Good Beer Guide.

The pub was later graffitied and vandalised. The Heineken and Carlsberg breweries requested that the pub cease serving its products, and the maintenance company Innserve declined to continue its work at the pub. In May 2023 the pub announced its closure, citing the opposition from its suppliers and from CAMRA as the reason.
