= Golliwog =

Doll-like character

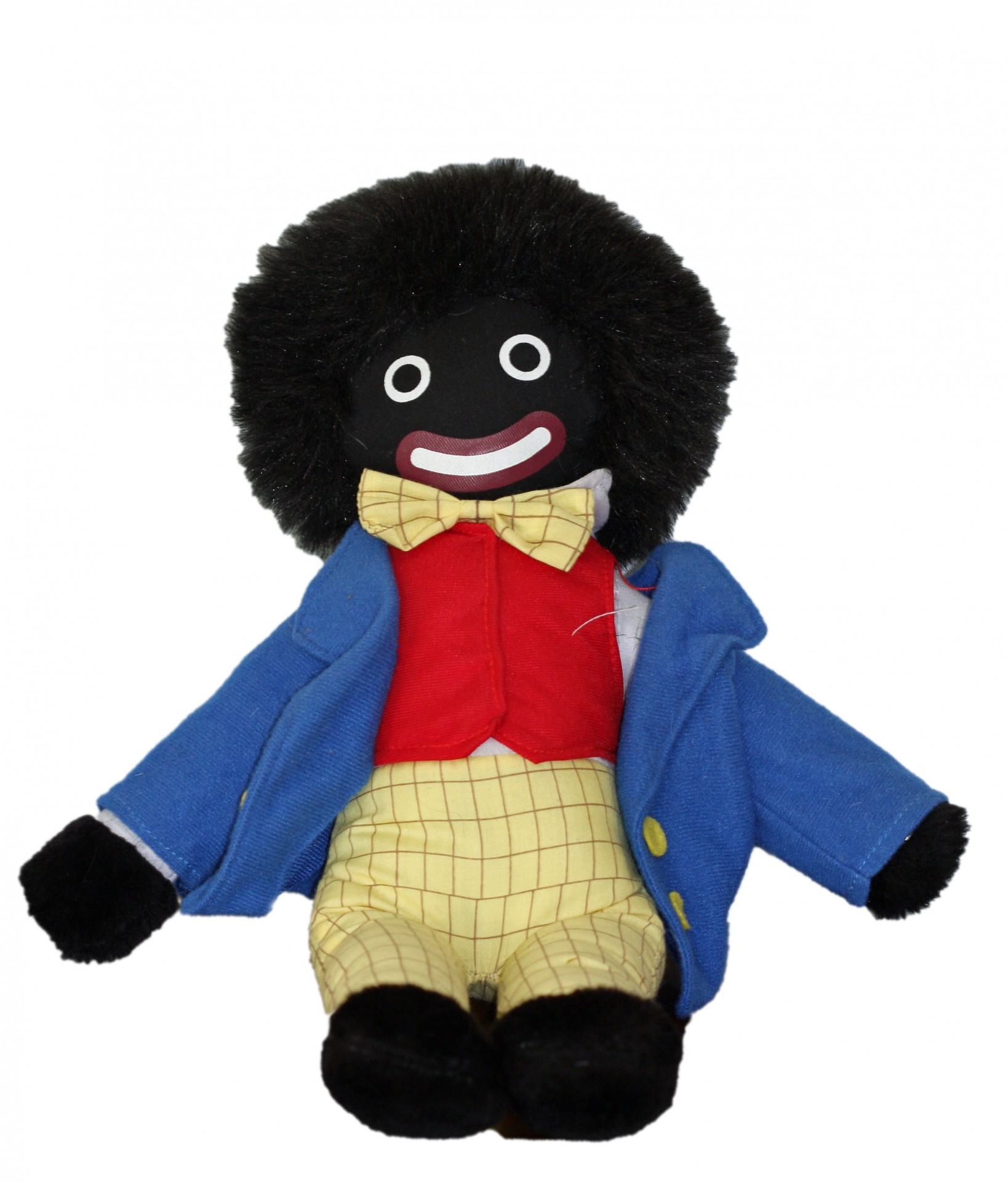
A golliwog in the form of a child's soft play toy

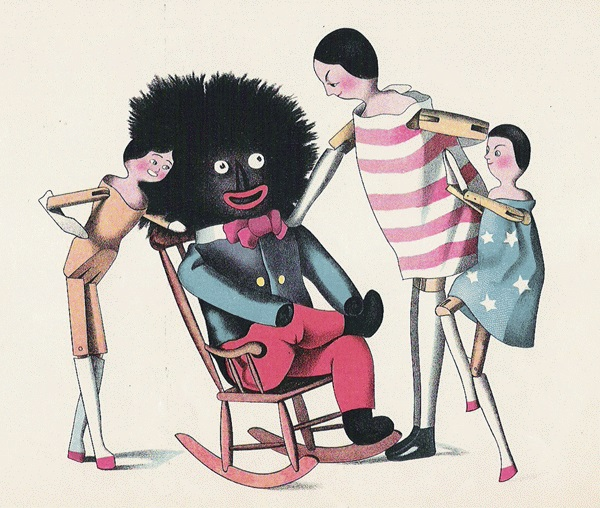
Florence Kate Upton's Golliwogg in formal minstrel attire in The Adventures of Two Dutch Dolls and a Golliwogg in 1895

The golliwog, also spelled golliwogg or shortened to golly, is a doll-like play character, created by cartoonist and author Florence Kate Upton, which appeared in children's books in the late 19th century, usually depicted as a type of rag doll. It was reproduced, both by commercial and hobby toy-makers, as a children's soft toy called the "golliwog", a portmanteau of golly and polliwog, and had great popularity worldwide, especially in the Southern United States, the United Kingdom, South Africa and Australia well into the 1970s, but have become more divisive due to being racist minstrel caricatures.

The golliwog is controversial. While some view them as a harmless toy associated with childhood memories, they are widely considered a racist caricature of black people, alongside pickaninnies, minstrels, and mammy figures. The doll is characterised by jet black skin, eyes rimmed in white, exaggerated red lips and frizzy hair, based on the blackface minstrel tradition. Since the 20th century, the word "golliwog" has been considered a racial slur towards black people. The Jim Crow Museum of Racist Memorabilia described the golliwog as "the least known of the major anti-black caricatures in the United States". Changing political attitudes with regard to race have reduced the popularity and sales of golliwogs as toys. Manufacturers who have used golliwogs as a motif (e.g. Robertson's marmalade in the UK) have either withdrawn them as an icon or changed the name. Alternative names such as golly and golly doll have also been adopted due to association with the racial slur wog, which many dictionaries say may be derived from golliwog.

== History ==
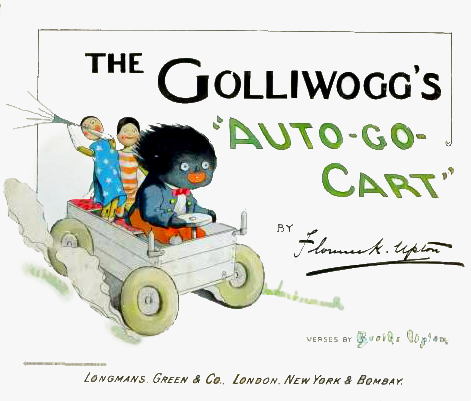
The Golliwogg's Auto-Go-Cart, a 1901 book by Florence Kate Upton

Florence Kate Upton was born in 1873 in Flushing, New York, United States, the daughter of English parents who had emigrated to the United States three years previously. Following the death of her father, she moved back to England with her mother and sisters when she was fourteen. There she spent several years drawing and developing her artistic skills. To afford tuition at art school, she illustrated a children's book entitled The Adventures of Two Dutch Dolls and a Golliwogg. The 1895 book included a character named the Golliwogg, who was first described as "a horrid sight, the blackest gnome", but who quickly turned out to be a friendly character, and is later attributed with a "kind face." A product of the blackface minstrel tradition, the Golliwogg had jet black skin, bright red lips, and wild woolly hair. He wore red trousers, a shirt with a stiff collar, red bow-tie, and a blue jacket with tails, all traditional minstrel attire.

Upton's book and its many sequels were extremely successful in England, largely because of the popularity of the Golliwogg. Upton did not trademark her character, and its name, spelt "golliwog", became the generic name for dolls and images of a similar type. Upton's Golliwogg was jovial, friendly and gallant, but some later golliwogs were sinister or menacing characters. For instance, a number of Enid Blyton's Noddy books feature Golliwog characters. It has been stated that some were heroes, while others were villains or naughty individuals. Professor David Rudd noted that golliwogs in the Noddy series were treated more as ambivalent tricksters than purely malicious figures. He counted the characters in the books, stating that there were numerically more bad teddy bears than golliwogs in the books. Other authors took a similar tack. The name "golliwog" came to be used as a degrading term for anyone who was not white-skinned, and new origins were suggested for the word. Upton despaired: "I am frightened when I read the fearsome etymology some deep, dark minds can see in his name."

The golliwog doll became a popular children's toy throughout most of the twentieth century, and was incorporated into many aspects of British commerce and culture.

== In culture ==
In the United States, the United Kingdom, Australia, South Africa and parts of Europe, in the late 19th and early 20th centuries, the golliwog character became popular in the form of children's literature, dolls, children's ceramics and other toys, ladies' perfume, and jewellery. One reason for its popularity and quick spread was that Upton never copyrighted the character and it became public domain, so anyone could use the golliwog name and image for their products.

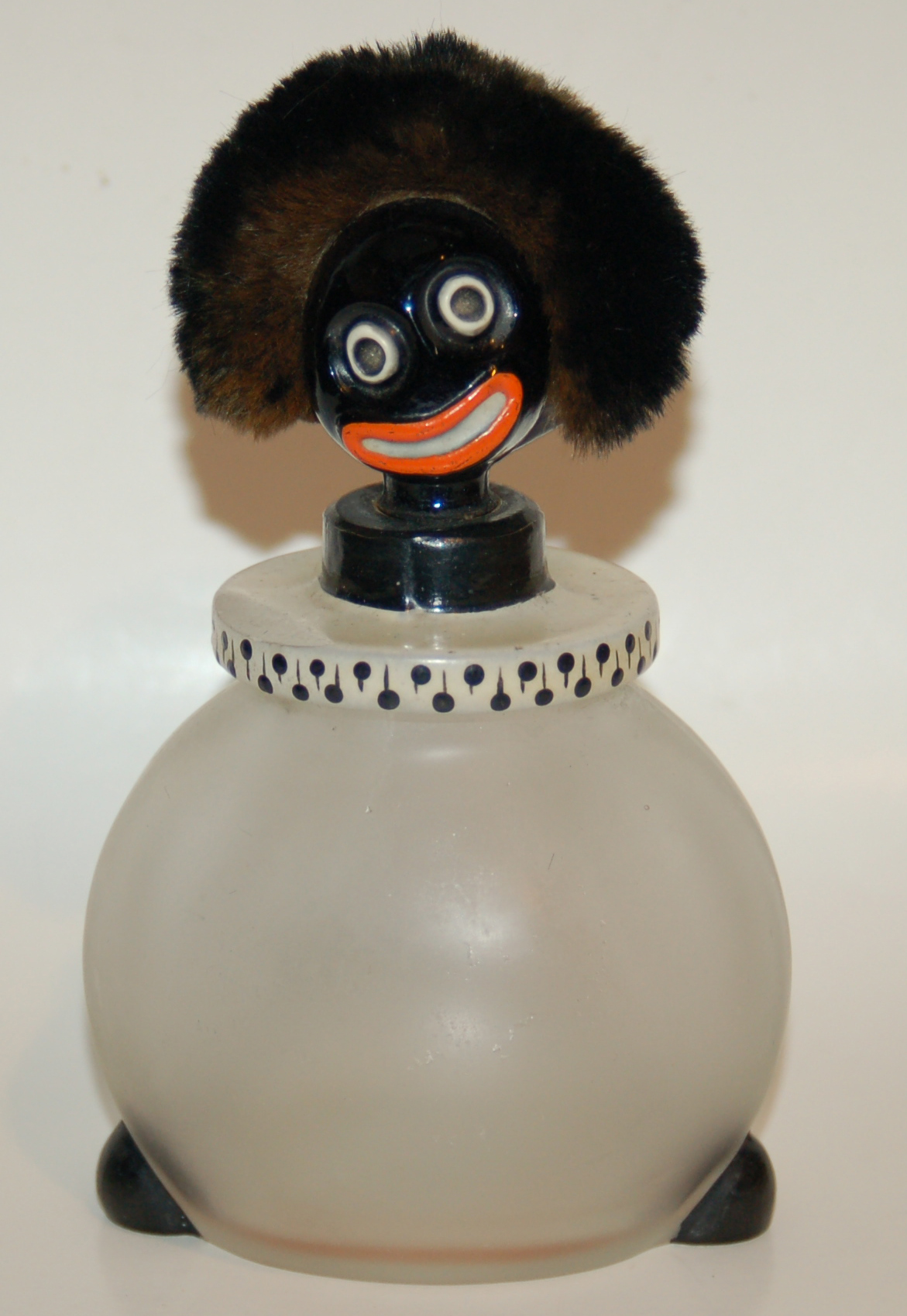
A 1920s golliwog perfume bottle

Golliwogg's Cakewalk is the sixth and final piece in the Children's Corner, a suite for piano published by French composer Claude Debussy in 1908.

While the first golliwog dolls were mostly self-made by parents for their children, in the early 20th century industrial production of golliwog plush dolls began. In 1908, German plush toy producer Steiff became the first company to mass-produce golliwog dolls, with other important German producers being Schuco and Levin.

In 1976, the world's first "special shape" hot air balloon was built by Cameron Balloons. Its shape and design was based on the Roberson's Golly character.

=== Food and confectionary branding ===
In Australia a chocolate-flavoured Golliwog biscuit was made by Guests Biscuits from the mid 1950s until November 1962 when the brand merged with Arnott's. The name was changed to Scalliwag in the mid-1990s, however the biscuits remained the same shape. The product was discontinued by the late 1990s, though they made a brief reappearance in 2010.

An aniseed-flavoured chewy confection called a Blackjack was marketed in the United Kingdom from the 1920s with a golliwog's face on the wrapper. In the late 1980s, Trebor, the manufacturer, replaced the image with the face of a black-bearded pirate.

Starting in 1957, HB Ice Cream produced the Golly Bar, an ice cream originally sold exclusively in the Republic of Ireland, whose packaging depicted images of a golliwog. Due to the increasing controversy surrounding the character, the golliwog was removed from packaging in 1992, and the name was later changed to Giant Bars.

==== Robertson's ====
British jam manufacturer James Robertson & Sons used a golliwog called Golly as its mascot from 1910, after John Robertson apparently saw children playing with golliwog dolls in the United States. Robertson's started producing promotional Golly badges in the 1920s, which could be obtained in exchange for tokens gained from their products. By the 1950s, the firm had incorporated the figure into the advertising campaign for its jams with the slogan "Golly! They're Good".

In 1983, Robertson's products were boycotted by Ken Livingstone's Greater London Council due to their perceived offensiveness, and in 1988 the character ceased to be used in television advertising. The company used to give away golliwog badges and small plaster figures playing musical instruments (jazz musicians) or sports and other such themes. The Gollywog badge collection scheme was withdrawn in 2001.

Virginia Knox, previously brand director for Robertson's and later chief operating officer of the Culinary Brands Division of RHM, told The Herald newspaper in Scotland in 2001 that the decision to remove the Golly symbol from Robertson's jam and marmalade jars was taken after research found that children were not familiar with the character, although it still appealed to the older generations. "We sell 45 million jars of jam and marmalade each year and they have pretty much all got Golly on them," said Knox. "We also sell 250,000 Golly badges to collectors and only get 10 letters a year from people who don't like the Golliwog image".

=== Performing arts ===
A classic contortionist act is the rag doll act: often performed in a golliwog costume, it is therefore also called the golliwogg act.

A golliwog takes centre stage in the B-movie thriller Tomorrow at Ten (1962), in which a golliwog with a bomb planted in it is used in a kidnapping scheme.

In The League of Extraordinary Gentlemen: Black Dossier and Volume IV: The Tempest, Alan Moore and Kevin O'Neill included Upton's original Golliwog with a slightly reimagined, alien past. When this was attacked as a racist character, Moore responded that Upton's original Golliwog "was a dignified and respectable figure. His courage and strength of character were ably demonstrated in his picaresque adventures, as was his intellectual acumen."

== Association with racism ==
According to a 2013 editorial in The Times, golliwogs were designed to reflect a racist stereotype that treated black men as an object of ridicule, and perpetuated racial prejudice by introducing this stereotype to children. They were the second most popular children's toy in Europe in the first half of the 20th century, after the teddy bear. Golliwogs were banned by Nazi Germany in 1934 on the grounds they were inappropriate toys for Aryan children.

=== Australia ===
On 1 December 2016, Australian Aboriginal activist, author and filmmaker Stephen Hagan caused a national controversy when he labelled Toowoomba the "most racist city in Australia" after a display of nine golliwog dolls were placed by Terry White Chemists underneath a sign inviting shoppers to "Experience a White Christmas". The controversy began when Toowoomba man George Helon spotted the dolls placed beneath the sign, and circulated a picture of it on Facebook and Twitter. The display was only in one store, as a franchisee can "stock and sell products at their discretion"; however, Terry White Chemists banned the sale of the golliwogs in any franchise afterwards.

In September 2018, three golliwog dolls were removed from public display at the Royal Adelaide Show arts and crafts display after Indigenous community group Deadly Yarning posted pictures of them on Facebook and denounced them as racist.

In March 2019, a hot air balloon with a Golliwog face named "Black Magic" and also known by the nickname "Golly" was banned from participating at the Canberra Balloon Spectacular over its "racist and offensive" name and façade.

Griffith University lecturer Eddie Synot has said that the dolls perpetuate a "narrative of the inferiority of black people" in Australia, and that the country should try to engage in "difficult conversations" about the toy.

=== New Zealand ===
On 22 March 2021, the Gollyville quilt of a Whakatāne artist, Barbara Key, was removed from the Art House's Carving Symposium and Art Exhibition, due to a visitor finding the quilt to be offensive.

=== United Kingdom ===
In March 2007, Greater Manchester Police seized two golliwogs from a shop after a complaint that the dolls were offensive. In September 2008, a woman from Stockport claimed she was arrested for keeping a "golly doll" in her window. Greater Manchester Police said she was arrested "on suspicion of a racially-aggravated public order offence" and released without charge.

In February 2009, in an off-air conversation at the BBC, Carol Thatcher, the daughter of former Prime Minister Margaret Thatcher, referred to the black French tennis player Jo-Wilfried Tsonga, who was competing in the Australian Open, as looking like a golliwog. The comment was considered by the BBC as "wholly unacceptable" and Thatcher was informed that unless she apologised she would no longer be a reporter on BBC's The One Show. Thatcher stated that it was a silly joke and declined to make an "unconditional apology". Thatcher said that her comment was a reference to the golliwog motifs that she saw in her childhood on jars of jam (made by Robertson's). In April that year, she was interviewed on The Andrew Marr Show, a BBC television programme, defending her use of the word. The French publication Sportsweek claimed that Thatcher, in talking about a previous competition, referred to another player as "the one who was defeated by the golliwog in the previous tour." The French publication, which showed a picture of Tsonga above a picture of a toy golliwog, claimed that Thatcher was "mortified" and that her comment was about the similarity of Tsonga's appearance to the doll that she had as a child.

In March 2011, Conservative English politician Bill Etheridge and his wife, Star, resigned from the Conservatives after their membership was suspended following complaints from party members that they were photographed posing with knitted golliwogs on their Facebook profile pages as part of a protest against political correctness.

In December 2013, a councillor in Brighton was forced to apologise for stating to a newspaper reporter that golliwogs were not racist. Councillor Dawn Barnett was defending a local shop which was selling golliwog drinks mats. She stated, "I said I can see no harm in them. They are nostalgic, I'm 72 years old. My generation grew up with them." Bert Williams, speaking on behalf of Brighton and Hove Black History Group, said the word "golliwog" was historically used to tease black people, of which he had personal experience.

In January 2015, Chaka Artwell, a campaigner, had his BBC interview cancelled after he refused to remove a golliwog doll he was wearing around his neck. He later said, "When I was growing up in this country, this guy was a popular figure. Then, without anyone asking me if I was offended by it, people decided I was offended by it. White, middle-class liberal types decided I was offended by this guy and in the year 2015 I don't want people telling me what I should be offended by. People pick and chose what they want to highlight. This is ridiculous." Oxford City Councillor Ben Lloyd-Shogbesan said, "I think it demeans the image of black people. I think (Artwell) was trying to make a point but on the wrong basis and I think it shows a lack of sensitivity to people who don't like that image. I would have said to him 'you might not find it offensive, but a lot of people do – so maybe find another medium to have that conversation?".

In August 2016, Charlotte Nightingale, a retired midwife from Ghana, started a campaign where she defended the golliwog, selling various golliwog dolls for charity events and launching a website called 'Gollynomics'. She expressed her belief for the toy to be reclaimed in a positive light and believed it to be a type of traditional rag doll made for African children which made its way to America via the slave trade, arguing that the toys should be considered as part of African culture.

In April 2018, a man in Prestatyn was fined £250 plus £85 costs for displaying a golliwog in a window opposite two Indian restaurants. He pleaded guilty to a racially aggravated public order offence."

In July 2018, a YouGov poll asked 1,660 Britons whether it was "racist to sell or display a golliwog doll", to which 63% responded "No", 20% "Yes", and 17% "I'm Not Sure".

In April 2023, Essex Police removed several golliwog dolls displayed in the White Hart Inn in Grays in Essex in response to an alleged hate crime. The pub's owner, Benice Ryley, said, "They're my childhood history, it's a part of our inheritance. I can't see any harm. I don't know how they can find it offensive." The decision achieved international media attention amidst reports that the Home Secretary Suella Braverman objected to the action. The pub was later graffitied and vandalised and eventually closed for business after a number of their suppliers withdrew their services. Later that month, a Norfolk café owner removed a display of golliwog dolls after police declared the exhibit a "hate incident".

== See also ==
- The Black and White Minstrel Show
- Black dolls
- Darlie
- Hajji Firuz
- The Golliwogs, an American rock band that later became Creedence Clearwater Revival
- Golly Bar
- Inki
- Little Black Sambo
- Natasha doll
- Papa Lazarou
- Raggedy Ann
- Sambo's restaurant chain
- Zwarte Piet
- List of ethnic slurs
