= Pullstring =

String for activating a mechanism

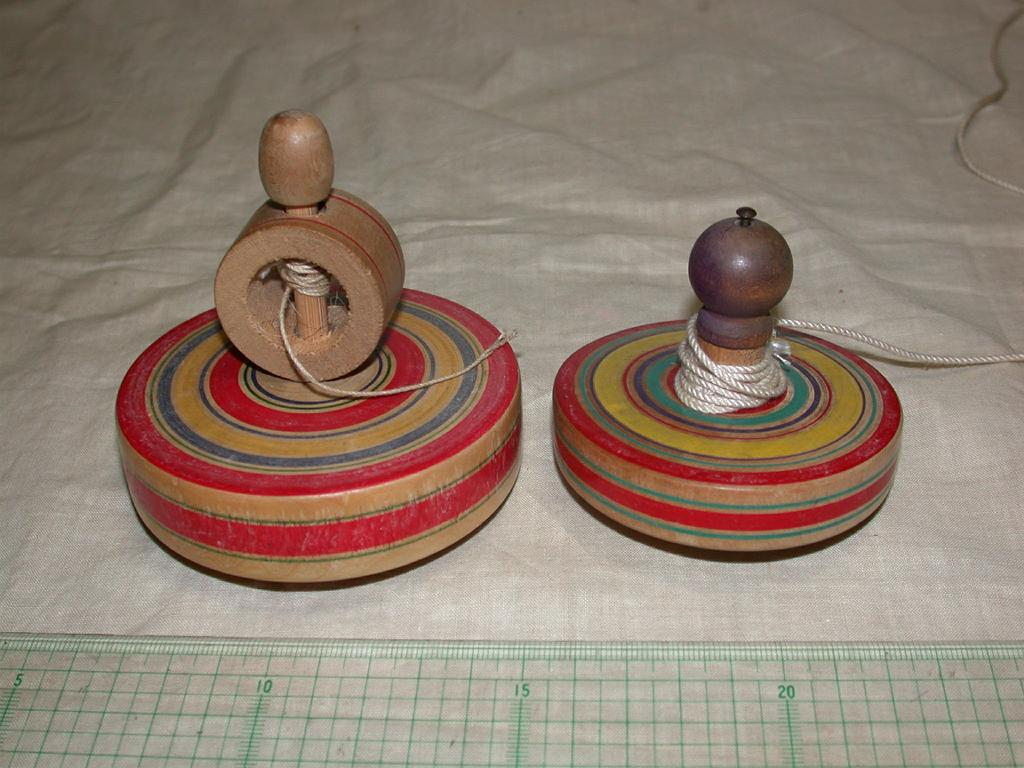
Japanese spinning tops with pullstrings

A pullstring (pull string, pull-string), pullcord (pull cord, pull-cord), or pullchain (pull-chain, pull chain) is a string, cord, or chain wound on a spring-loaded spindle that engages a mechanism when it is pulled. It is most commonly used in toys and motorized equipment. More generally and commonly, a pullstring can be any type of string, cord, rope, or chain, attached to an object in some way used to pull or mechanically manipulate part of it.

== Toys ==
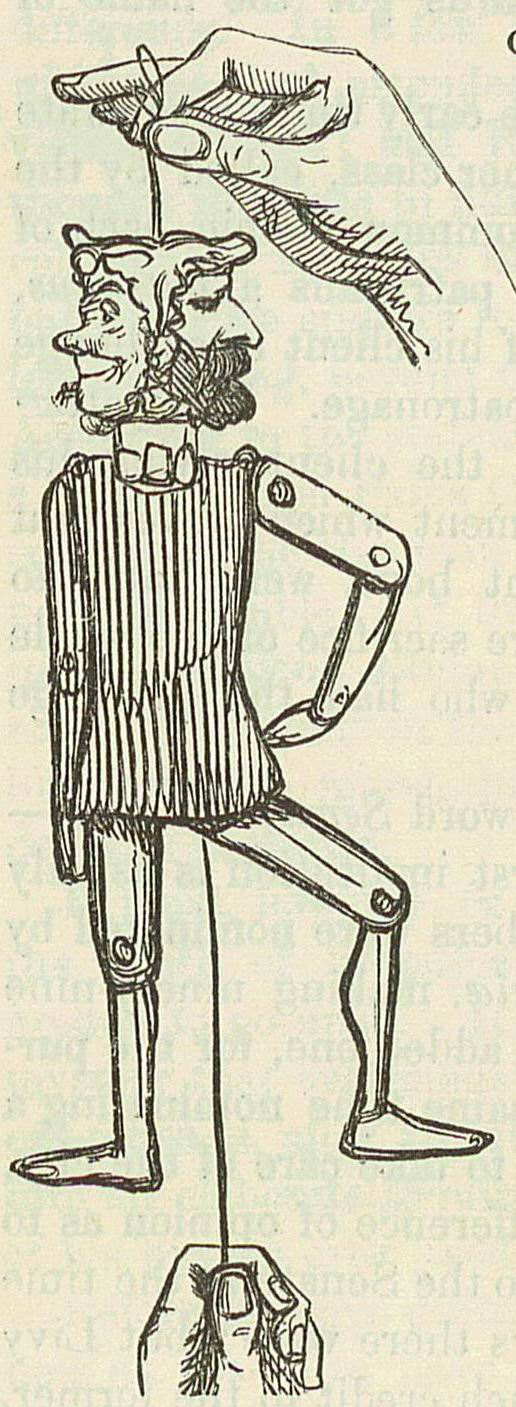
A jumping jack toy with pullstring

Perhaps the simplest pullstring toy is the yo-yo (c. 460 BCE). The jumping jack is a more complicated animated puppet paper doll that uses a pullstring to move its arms and legs up and down. Trompos and some spinning tops use a string that is wound around the top and then pulled to make it spin.

More recent toys include dolls, such as Chatty Cathy (1959), Charmin' Chatty (1963), Talking Tamu (1970), Horse from Mister Rogers' Neighborhood also known as Ino A Horse, Look Around Crissy (1972), Sky Dancers (1994), and Sheriff Woody (from the Toy Story franchise), that have a pullstring built into them that activates a speaker when it is pulled, causing the doll to say a built-in phrase. The Blythe doll (1972) has a pullstring that changes the doll's eye color. Other non-doll toys like See 'n Say (1965). In Mister Rogers’ Neighborhood episode 1627, a similar toy to a see N Say called a Speak N Spell is featured, but instead of the arrow pointing, The handles attached to the strings have the names of all the animals that are pulled to activate the sounds of the animals.

The earliest patent with a pullstring included in it is an 1886 "Toy Bowling-Alley".

== Engines ==
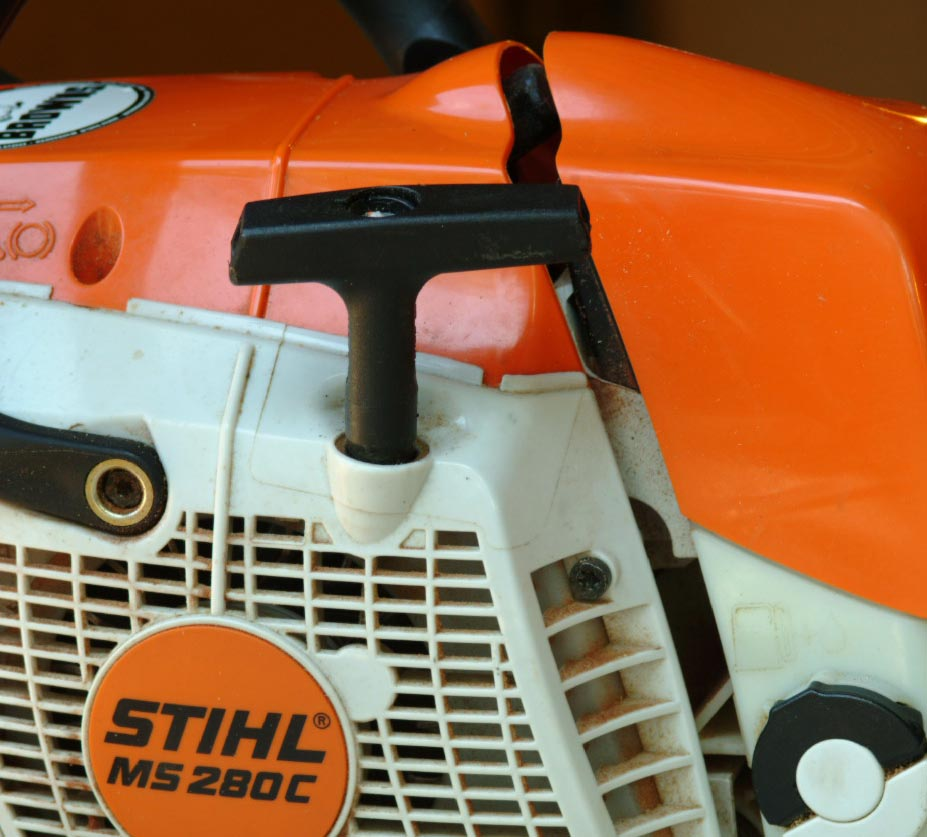
Stihl MS-280C chainsaw starter handle attached to a pullcord

Many motorized lawn mowers, chainsaws, portable generators, and portable outboard motors use a pullstring or pullcord attached to a handle as a manual ignition device. Some vehicle engines are also started with pullchains, such as the early-1900s Puckridge, or pullcords, like the pre-release version of the Citroën 2CV car, and the DKW RT 125 scooter. Early jet engines such as the Junkers Jumo 004 used a Riedel two-stroke starter motor actuated by a pullcord.

== Weapons ==
Some grenades such as the German Models 24, 39, and 43 have pullcords. Some machine guns such as the M73 machine gun and M85 machine gun use a pullchain to charge and/or fire them. The Kord machine gun uses a device to cock the weapon.

Various Booby trap weapons and devices have used cords/cables.

== Transport ==
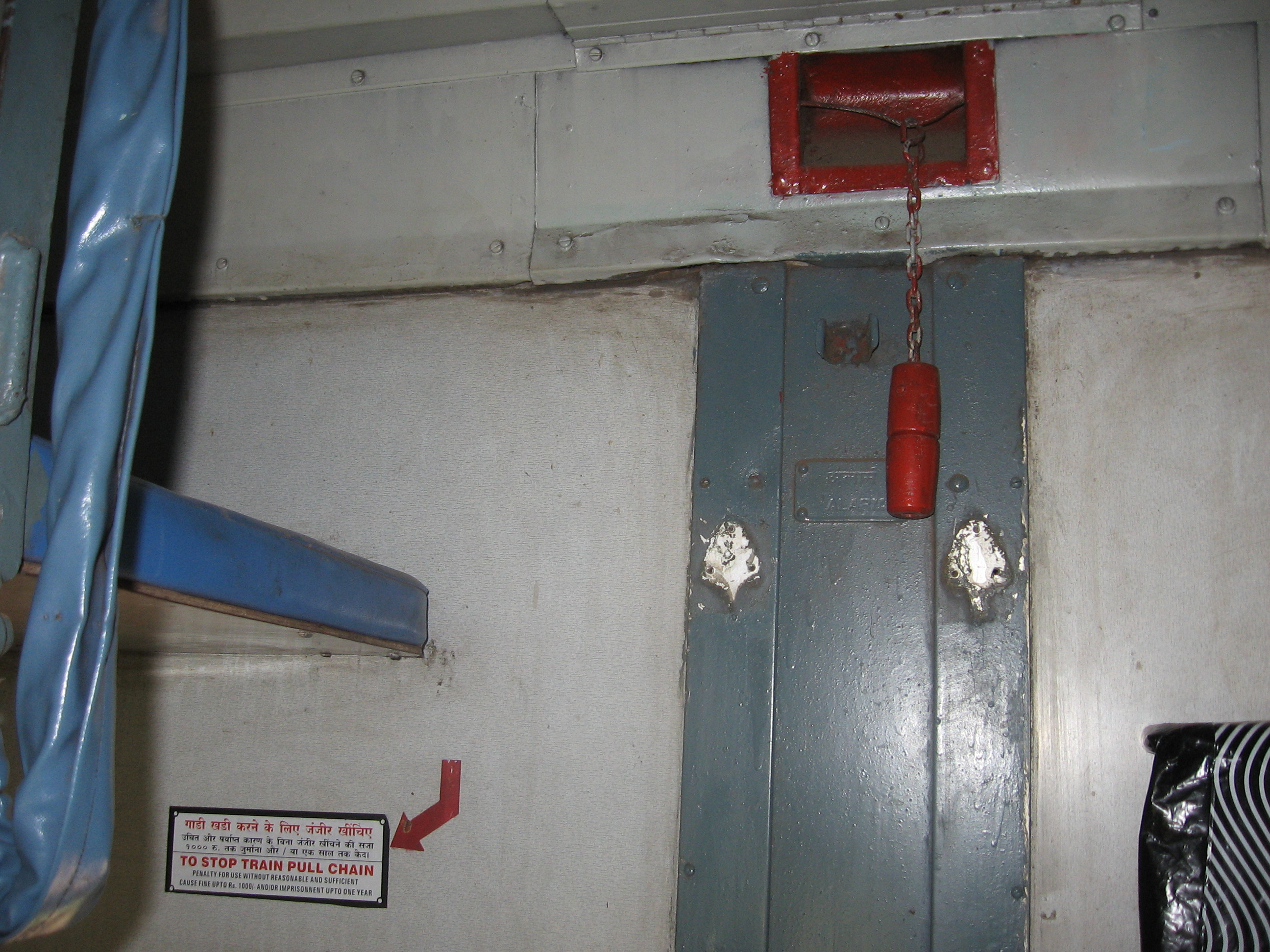
Pullchain on a train emergency brake in India.

A train's emergency brake can be a cord or chain that will stop the train when pulled.

Early trams/streetcars – in the late 19th and early 20th century, when trams were commonly operated by a two-man crew, a motorman (operator) and a conductor – were often equipped with a pullcord that was used by the conductor (often located at the rear of the car) to signal the motorman at stops that the doors had been closed and it was safe to proceed. Some trams/trolleys also had a pullcord for use by passengers, to signal the driver that they were requesting a stop by sounding a buzzer. That use of pullcords, as stop-request mechanisms, continued as trams transitioned into the era of one-person operation; these commonly sound a bell rather than a buzzer, and are often known as bell cords. They were also used on many transit buses, and remain in use in the 21st century. However, many newer vehicles now use buttons to request stops instead.

The Jaguar XK120 sports car's doors have no external handles so it uses an interior pullcord instead.

== Other ==
Some types of window blinds and curtains use a cord pull to open, close, raise, and lower them. Some types of ladders like the extension ladder and attic ladder can have a pullstring that pulls it down from the ceiling. A dock plate can use a pullchain to move it. Some gates have a pullstring on its latch. A pull switch uses a chain or string to actuate a switch, commonly used in lighting and ceiling fans. Modern flush toilets use a pullchain attached to a lever that lifts the plunger to release water into the toilet bowl. The photoplayer uses pullchains to generate sound effects for silent films. Pre-1990s North American diesel locomotive train horns used a lever or pull cord to actuate an air valve. Older steam whistles were almost always actuated with a pull cord.

Some grandfather clocks have a pullchain to raise the weights in order to wind the clock's gears. A lifejacket has a pullcord used to inflate it.

== Variants ==
A bowstring is perhaps the simplest type of pullstring that pulls a bow's ends together. A ripcord is a type of pullstring used to release a parachute. A drawstring is a type of pullstring used in many aspects of the fashion industry and in bags as a closing device.

== See also ==
- Bell pull
- Drawer pull
- Drawstring
- Hoist (device)
- Pull switch
