= Pull switch =

Switch operated with pull chain found on ceiling fans

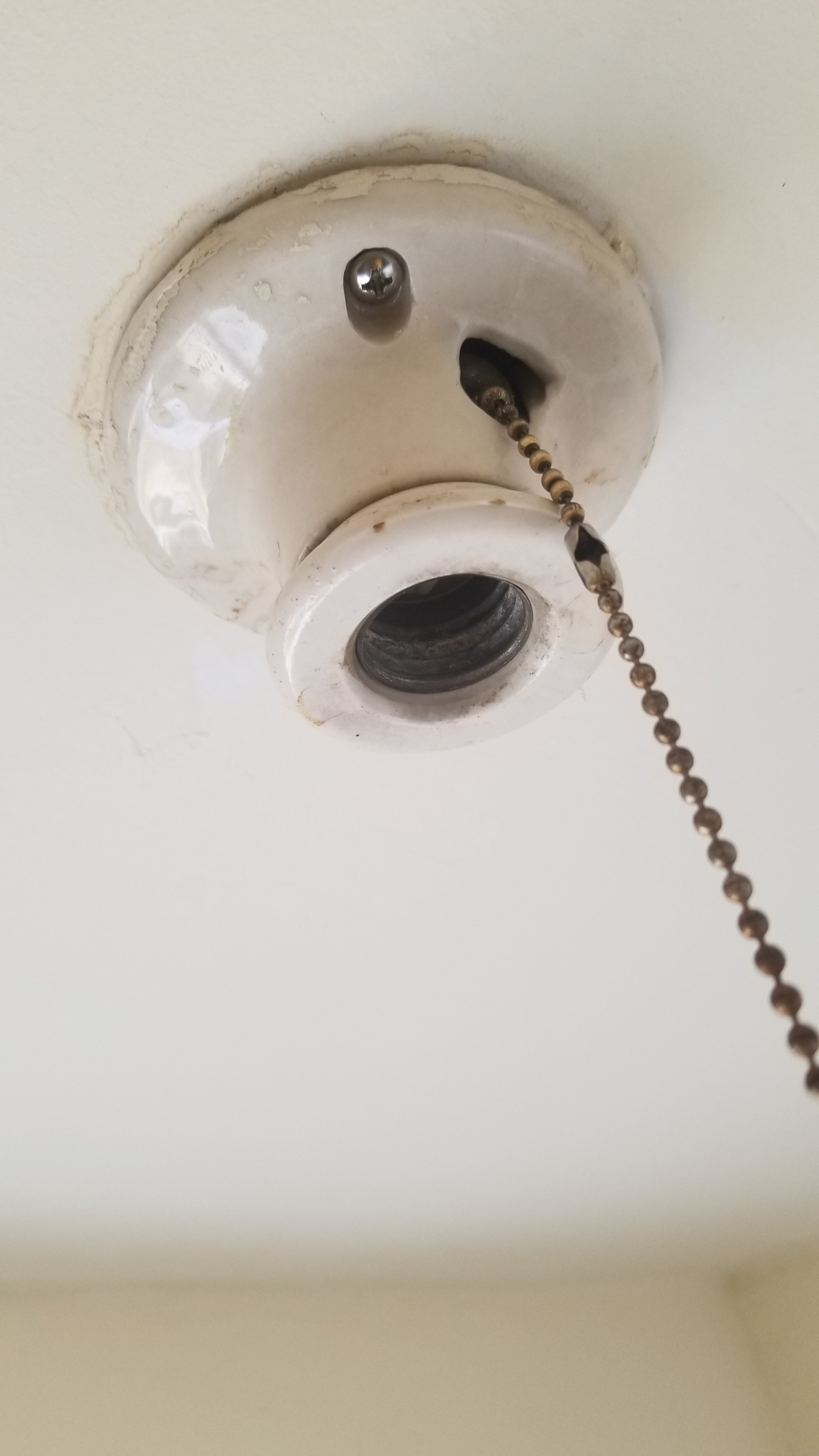
This lamp socket uses a ball chain attached to a pull switch for control.

A pull switch, also known as pull-cord switch, or light pull, or pull chain is a switch that is actuated by means of a chain or string.

== History ==
An electric pull switch is attached to a toggle type switch: one pull to switch on and next pull to switch off. It was invented by Harvey Hubbell, who was granted its patent in 1896.

== Mechanics ==
The most common use of a pull switch is to operate a ceiling electric light. The ceiling fan and mechanical wall fans are also appliances often operated by pull switches. Pull switches may be either two-position (open or closed) or multi-position (allowing for different fan speeds or levels of illumination).

Mounted inside a pull switch, there could be two types of two-position toggle switches. (In both cases the stable physical open- or closed -situation would be switch in outer and string in upper position.) One type would switch to closed (alternatively open) already during the initial pull in the string. The other type would switch to closed (or open) only when releasing after a full pull. With the first type, the weight of the string and handle could accidentally switch the load intermittently on and off, when still around the initial position (depending on the internal spring). This could potentially increase the danger of overheating in the switch.

Most commercially available pull switches use a short length of ball chain, which may then be connected to any number of optional leads for added length or decoration. Leads for decoration or utility are made of brass, acrylic, ceramic, or other materials. They can come in many different shapes ranging from geometric shapes to animals.

== See also ==
- Light switch
