= Black doll =

Doll representing a Black person

A Black doll is a doll of a black person. Black doll manufacture dates back to the 19th century, with representations being both realistic and stereotypical. More accurate, mass-produced depictions are manufactured today as toys and adult collectibles.

== Centers of manufacture ==
=== Europe ===
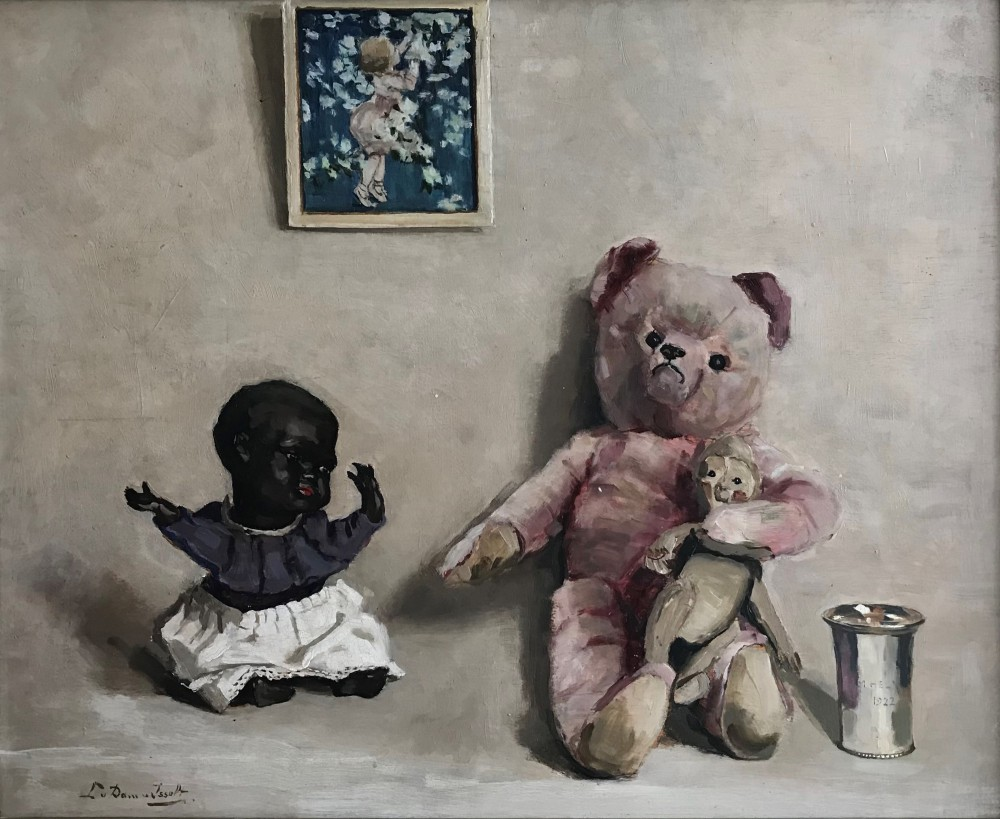
Painting by Lucie van Dam van Isselt, the Netherlands, around 1935

Several 19th-century European doll companies preceded American doll companies in manufacturing Black dolls. These predecessors include Carl Bergner of Germany, who made a three-faced doll with one face of a crying black child and the other two, happier white faces. In 1892, Jumeau of Paris advertised Black and mixed-race dolls with bisque heads. Gebruder Heubach of Germany made character faces in bisque. Other European doll makers include Bru Jne. & Cie and Société Française de Fabrication de Bébés et Jouets (S.F.B.J.) of France, and Kestner and Steiner of Germany.

=== North America ===
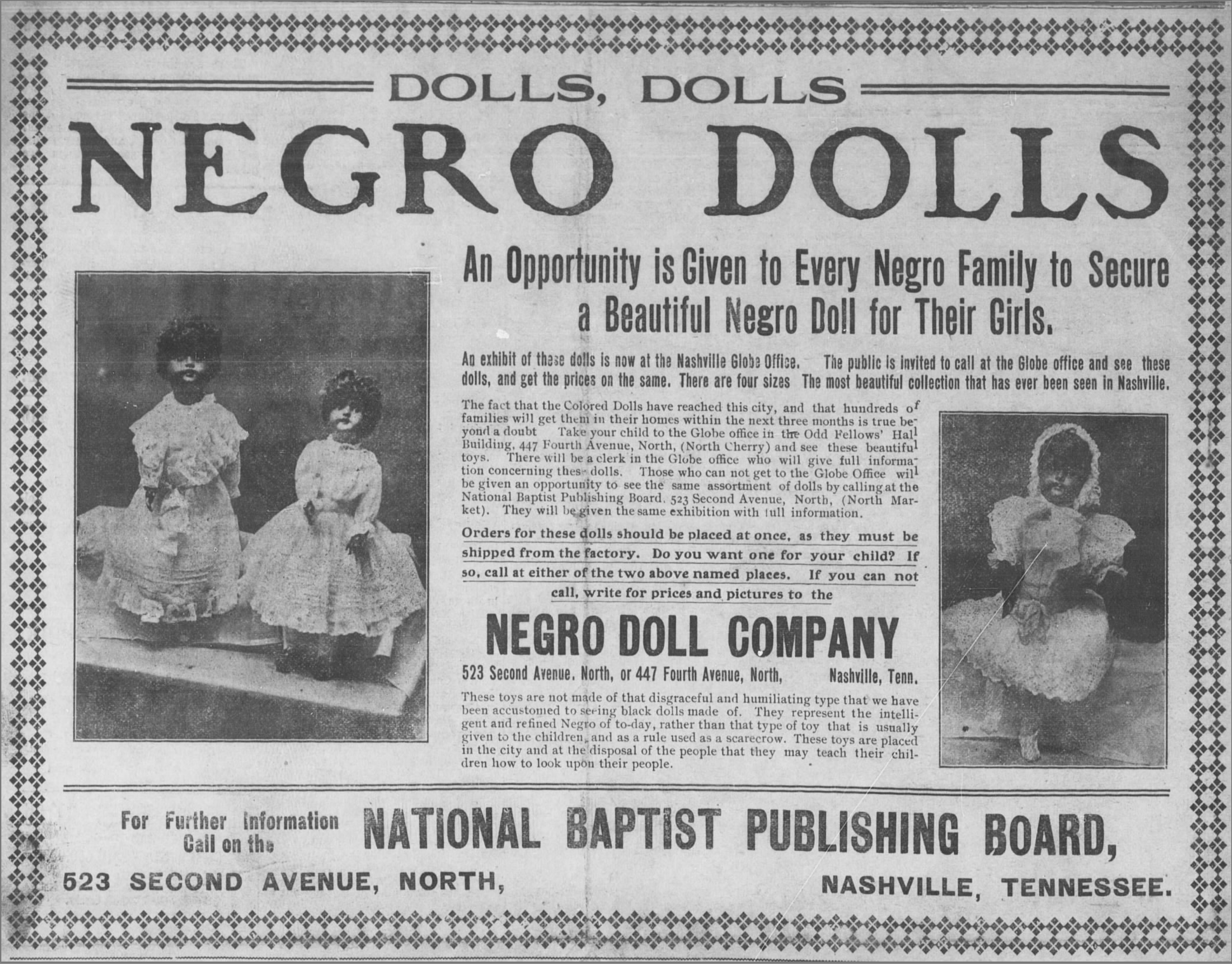
Ad for the Negro Doll Company, Nashville, Tennessee, 1908

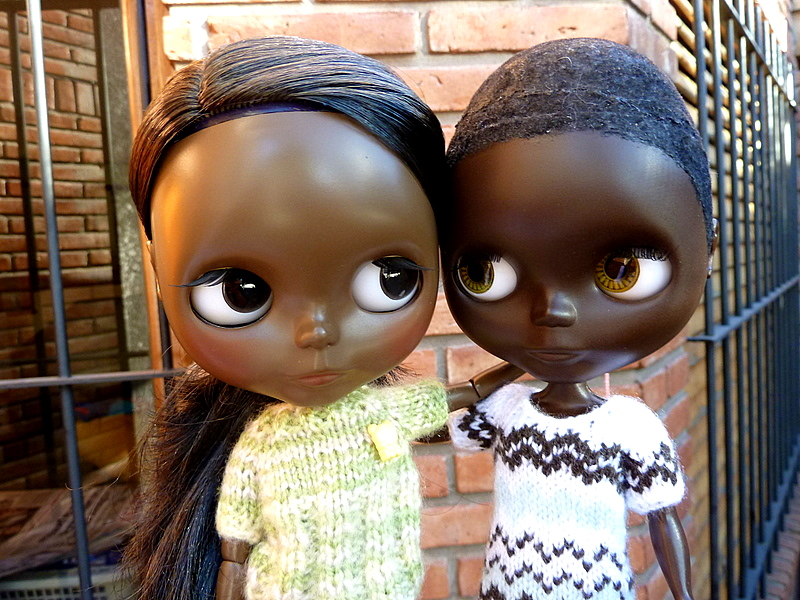
Modern black dolls

American entrepreneur Richard Henry Boyd founded the National Negro Doll Company in 1911 "after he tried to purchase dolls for his children but could find none that were not gross caricatures of African Americans."

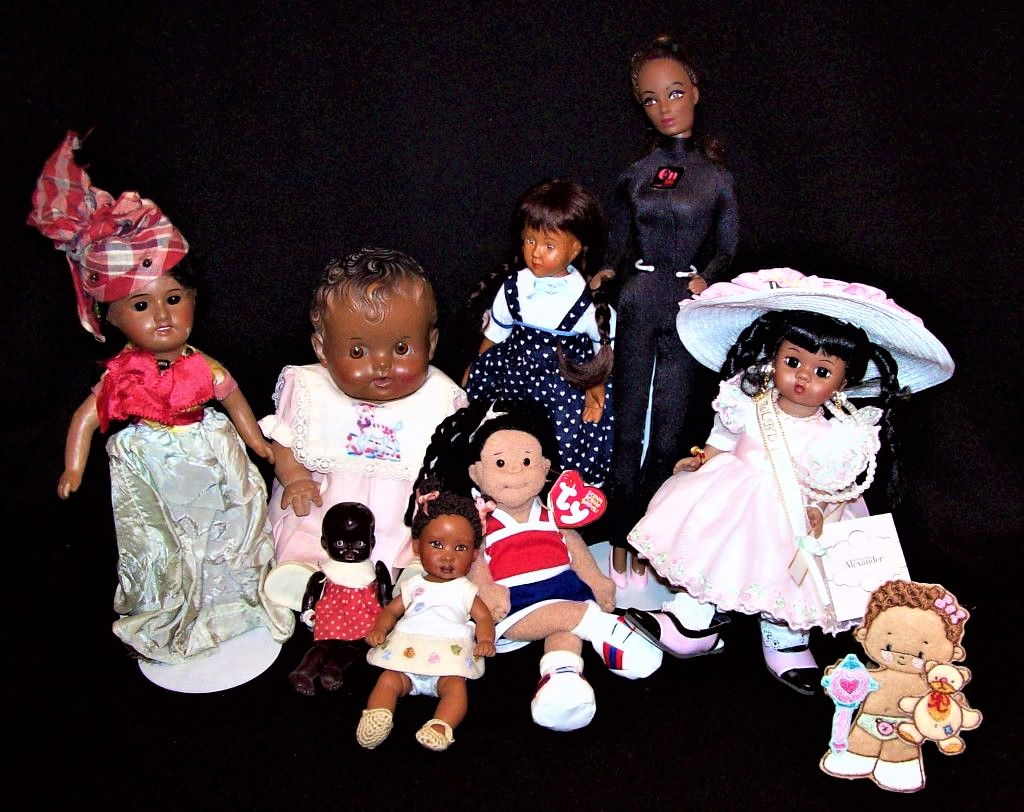
Antique-to-modern black dolls from the collection of Debbie Garrett represent a variety of doll genres and mediums.

American companies began including Black dolls in their doll lines in the early 1900s. Between 1910 and 1930, Horsman, Vogue, and Madame Alexander included Black dolls in their doll lines. Gradually, other American companies followed suit.

In 1947, the first African American woman cartoonist Jackie Ormes created the Patty-Jo doll, which was based on Patty-Jo 'n Ginger, the cartoon panel she penned for newspapers at the time. The doll was a realistic Black doll, breaking the mammy doll stereotype.

Beatrice Wright Brewington, an African American entrepreneur, founded B. Wright's Toy Company, Inc. and mass-produced Black dolls with ethnically correct features. Also an educator, Wright began instructing girls in the art of making dolls in 1955.

During the 1960s and in the aftermath of the Watts Riots in Los Angeles, California, Shindana Toys, a Division of Operation Bootstrap, Inc., is credited as the first major doll company to mass-produce ethnically correct Black dolls in the United States.

Other popular collectible Black dolls include manufactured play dolls past and current, manufactured dolls designed for collectors by companies such as Madame Alexander and Tonner Doll, artist dolls, one-of-a-kind dolls, portrait dolls and those representing historical figures, reborn dolls, and paper dolls. In addition, American Girl has also released Black dolls portraying girls of color from various points in American history such as Addy Walker and civil rights-era Melody Ellison, as well as those from the present day.

Mattel Toys created the first Black dolls in the popular Barbie line, Francie and Christie, in 1967 and 1969 respectively. This caused controversy at the time they were released.

==== Black doll museums ====
The Philadelphia Doll Museum was founded in 1988 by Barbara Whiteman. While the museum was open, roughly 1,000 Black dolls were on view. The Philadelphia Doll Museum is now closed.

To honor the history of Black dolls, in 2012, three sisters named Debra Britt, Felicia Walker, and Tamara Mattison opened the National Black Doll Museum of History and Culture in Mansfield, Massachusetts. While open to the public, it featured over 6,000 Black dolls and its mission is to continue to nurture the self-esteem of children and preserve the legacy of Black dolls. In December 2023, the museum reopened in Attleboro, Massachusetts at the Emerald Square Mall.

In January 2021, Black-doll collector, historian, and author on the subject of black dolls, Debbie Behan Garrett founded DeeBeeGee's Virtual Black Doll Museum, "the first and only virtual Black doll museum where antique, vintage, modern, and one-of-a-kind Black dolls are celebrated 24/7."

== See also ==
- African American culture
- Golliwog
- Natasha doll
- Topsy-Turvy doll
- Philadelphia Doll Museum

== Black Doll Reference Books ==
- Collector's Encyclopedia of Black Dolls by Patiki Gibbs, Collector Books, 1986
- Black Dolls an Identification and Value Guide 1820-1991 by Myla Perkins, Collector Books, 1991
- Black Dolls an Identification and Value Guide Book II by Myla Perkins, Collector Books, 1995
- The Definitive Guide to Collecting Black Dolls by Debbie Behan Garrett, Hobby House Press, 2003
- Black Dolls Proud, Bold & Beautiful by Nayda Rondon, Reverie Press, 2004
- Collectible African American Dolls Identification and Values by Yvonne Ellis, Collector Books, 2008
- Black Dolls: A Comprehensive Guide to Celebrating Collecting and Experiencing the Passion by Debbie Behan Garrett, 2008
