= Loading dock =

Area of a building where goods are loaded and unloaded

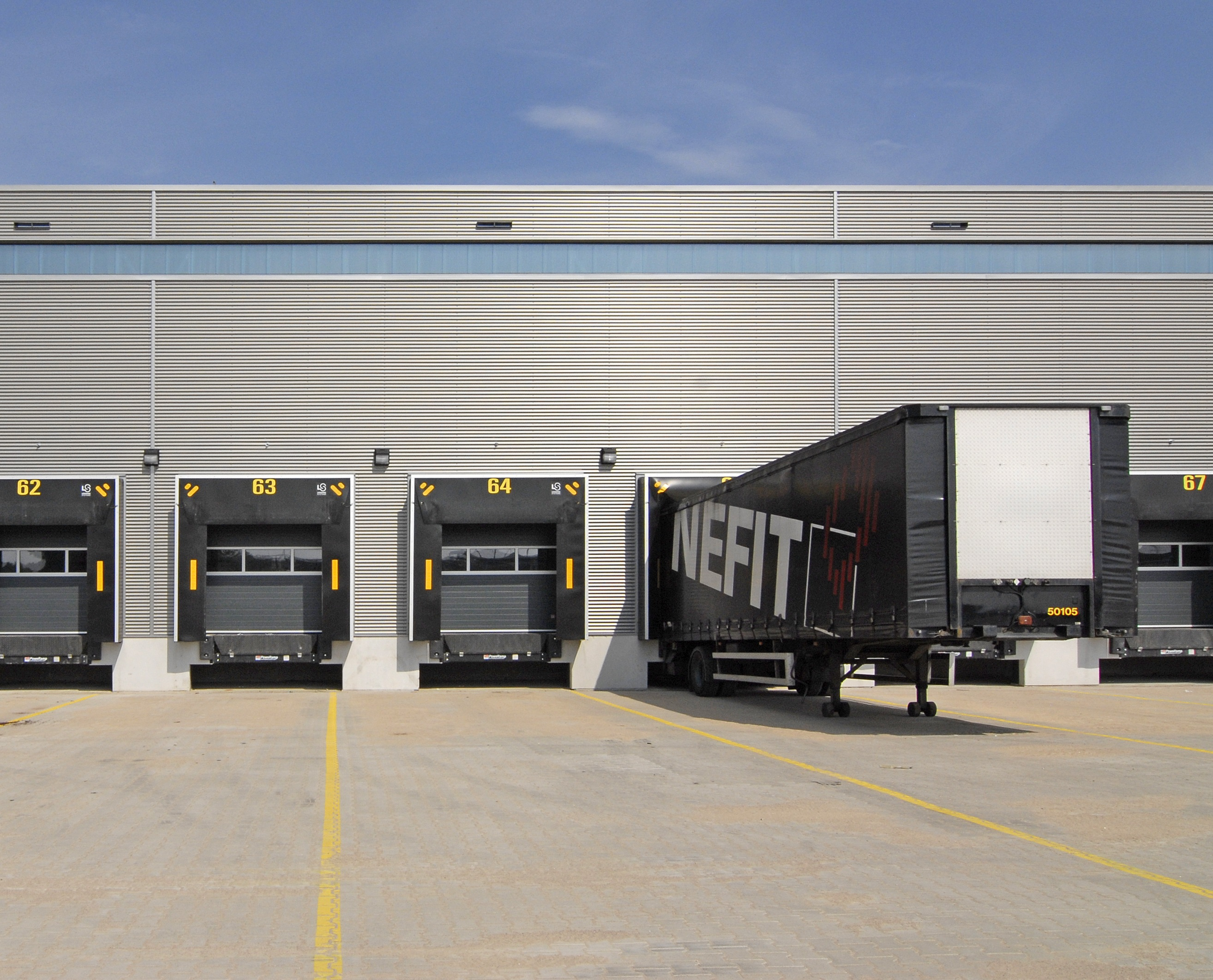
Modern loading bay with overhead door, dock leveller and dock shelter

A loading dock or loading bay is an area of a building where goods vehicles (usually road or rail) are loaded and unloaded. They are commonly found on commercial and industrial buildings, and warehouses in particular. Loading docks may be exterior, flush with the building envelope, or fully enclosed. They are part of a facility's service or utility infrastructure, typically providing direct access to staging areas, storage rooms, and freight elevators.

== Basics ==
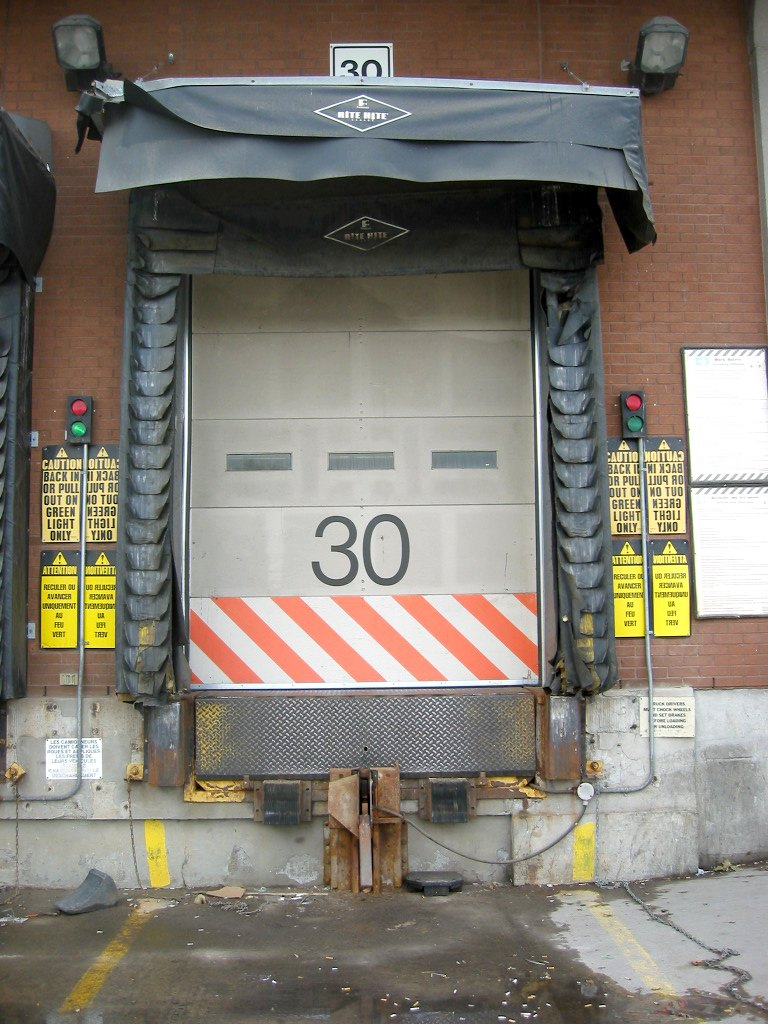
Truck loading dock with overhead door, dock leveler, dock seals, canopy, indicator lights, and truck restraint system

In order to facilitate material handling, loading docks may be equipped with the following:

- Bumpers – protect the dock from truck damage, may also be used as a guide by the truck driver when backing up.
- Dock leveler – a height-adjustable platform used as a bridge between dock and truck, can be operated via mechanical (spring), hydraulic, or air powered systems.
- Dock lift – serves the same function as a leveler, but operates similar to a scissor lift to allow for greater height adjustments.
- Dock seals or dock shelters – compressible foam blocks against which the truck presses when parked; seals are used at exterior truck bays in colder climates, where this will provide protection from the weather.
- Truck or vehicle restraint system – a strong metal hook mounted to the base of the dock which will hook to the frame or bumper of a trailer and prevents it from rolling away during loading operations, can be operated via manual, hydraulic, or electrical systems; this system can replace or work in conjunction with wheel chocks.
- Dock light – a movable articulating light mounted inside the dock used to provide lighting inside the truck during loading operations.
- Indicator lights - show truck drivers when to back in or pull out.
- Loading dock software – provides a method for tracking and reporting on the loading dock activity.
- Side shift - the truck dock is equipped with a side shift facility to enable accurate aligning of the roller deck with the truck. This facility includes two hydraulic cylinder assemblies, one at the front and one at the rear end of the dock, and enables a left/right movement.

Warehouses that handle palletized freight use a dock leveler, so items can be easily loaded and unloaded using power moving equipment (e.g. a forklift). When a truck backs into such a loading dock, the bumpers on the loading dock and the bumpers on the trailer come into contact but may leave a gap; also, the warehouse floor and the trailer deck may not be horizontally aligned. In North America, the most common dock height is 48–52 inches (120–130 cm), though heights of up to 55 inches (140 cm) occur as well. A dock leveler bridges the gap between a truck and a warehouse to safely accommodate a forklift.

Where it is not practical to install permanent concrete loading docks, or for temporary situations, then it is common to use a mobile version of the loading dock, often called a yard ramp.

== Loading zone ==
In different parts of the world, a section of a public or private road may be allocated for loading goods or persons, at specific or at all times. There are parking signs and/or road markings to warn motorists of parking regulations. These areas are known as loading zones or loading bays in many jurisdictions. They are generally monitored by parking inspectors, and vehicles found to be violating the rules can be towed or fined.

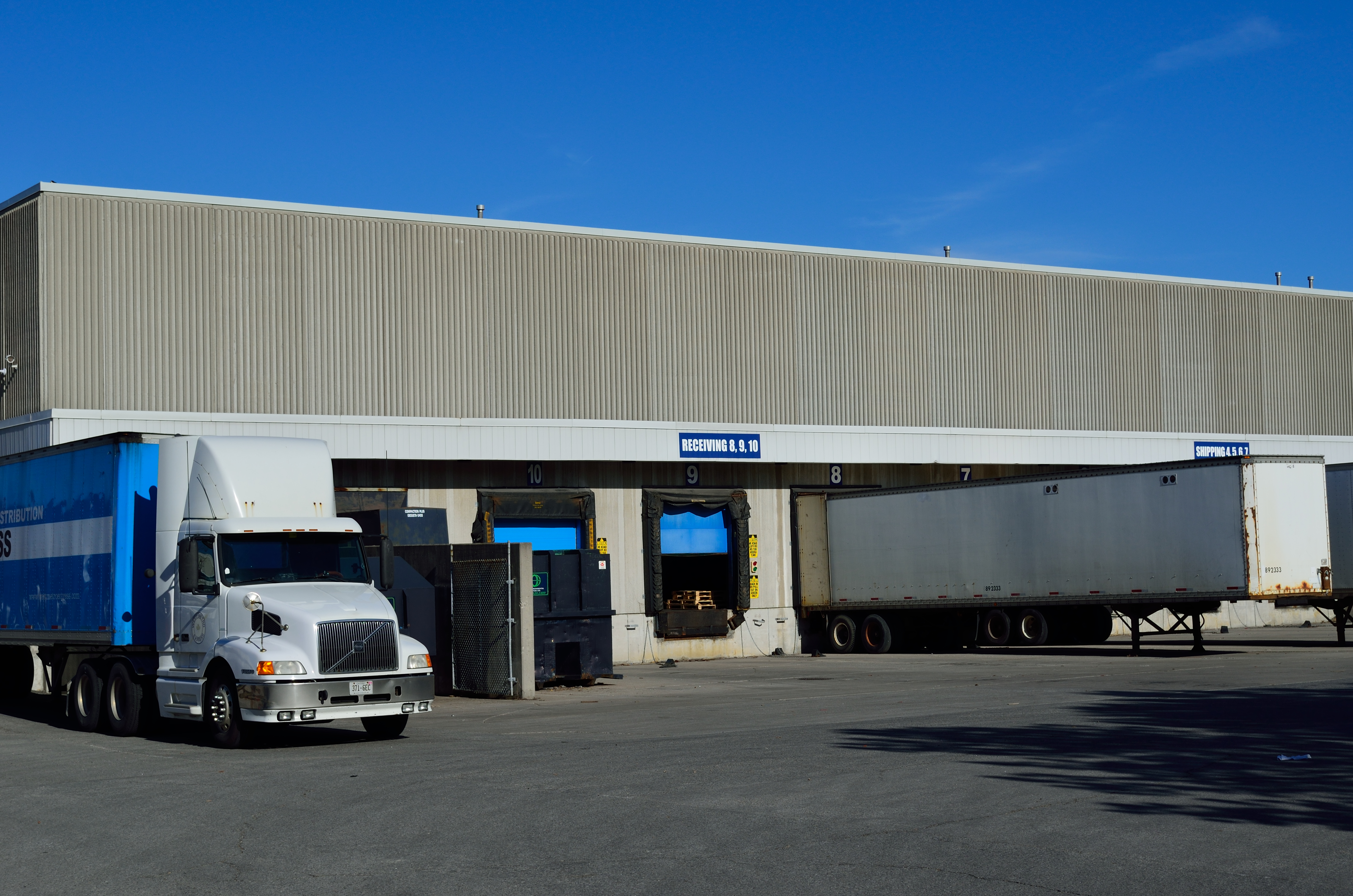
Typical warehouse exterior showing loading docks

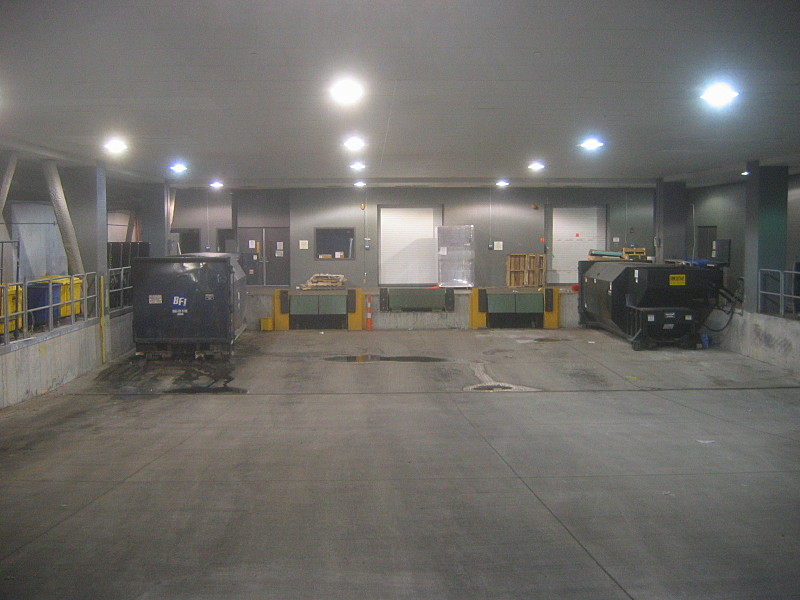
An interior loading dock at the New Research Building, Harvard Medical School

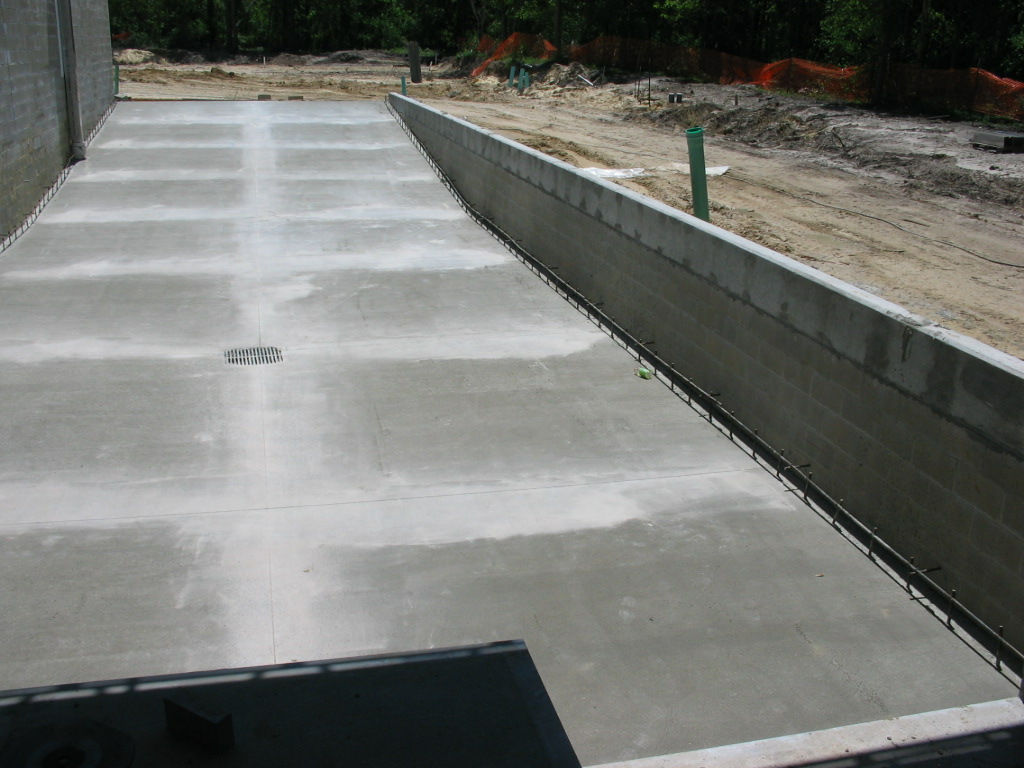
A reinforced concrete loading dock under construction

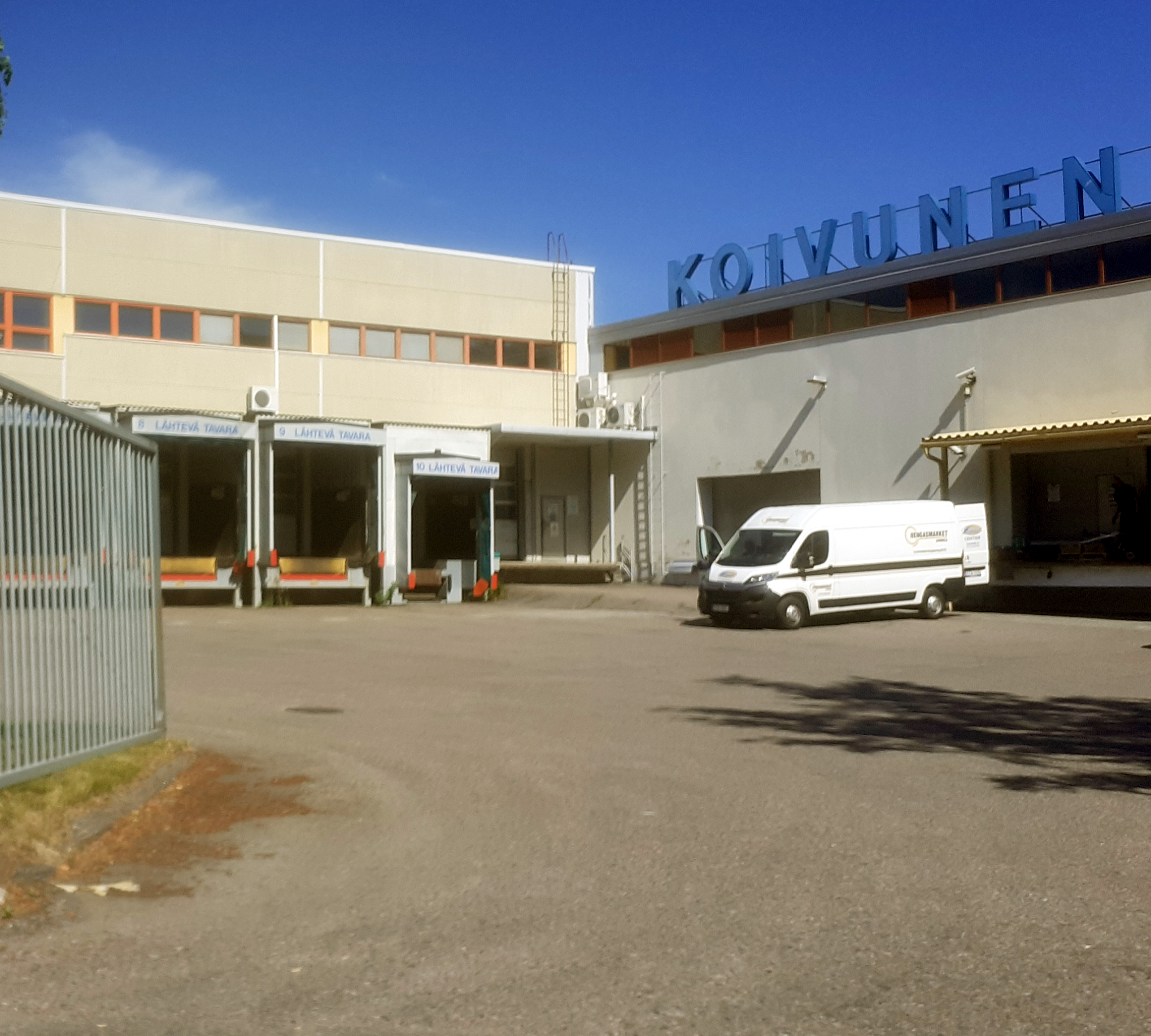
Loading docks at Koivunen Oy company in Malmi, Helsinki, Finland
