= Dock plate =

A dock plate is form of portable bridge used to both span the gap and adjust for elevation differences between a truck bed and a loading dock or warehouse floor. Other devices used to achieve the same ends include dock boards, and electric and pneumatic dock levelers and lifts. These various devices differ in construction, suitability to dock conditions, cost of installation, and loading capacity.

Dock plates and dock boards are generally portable; dock levelers and lifts are generally permanent fixtures.

Dock plates and dock boards are simply metal ramps which bridge the gaps between dock and truck. Dock plates are generally made out of aluminium whilst dock boards are generally made out of steel for greater strength. Aluminium dock plates are more suitable for lighter loads, including the weight of handcarts and dollies, whereas steel dock boards are used for heavier motorized equipment such as fork lift trucks and electric pallet jacks. Another difference is that dock plates are simple flat plates, whereas dock boards have integral curbs bolted or welded to one or more edges. These curbs both help prevent run-off and increase the weight bearing capacity.

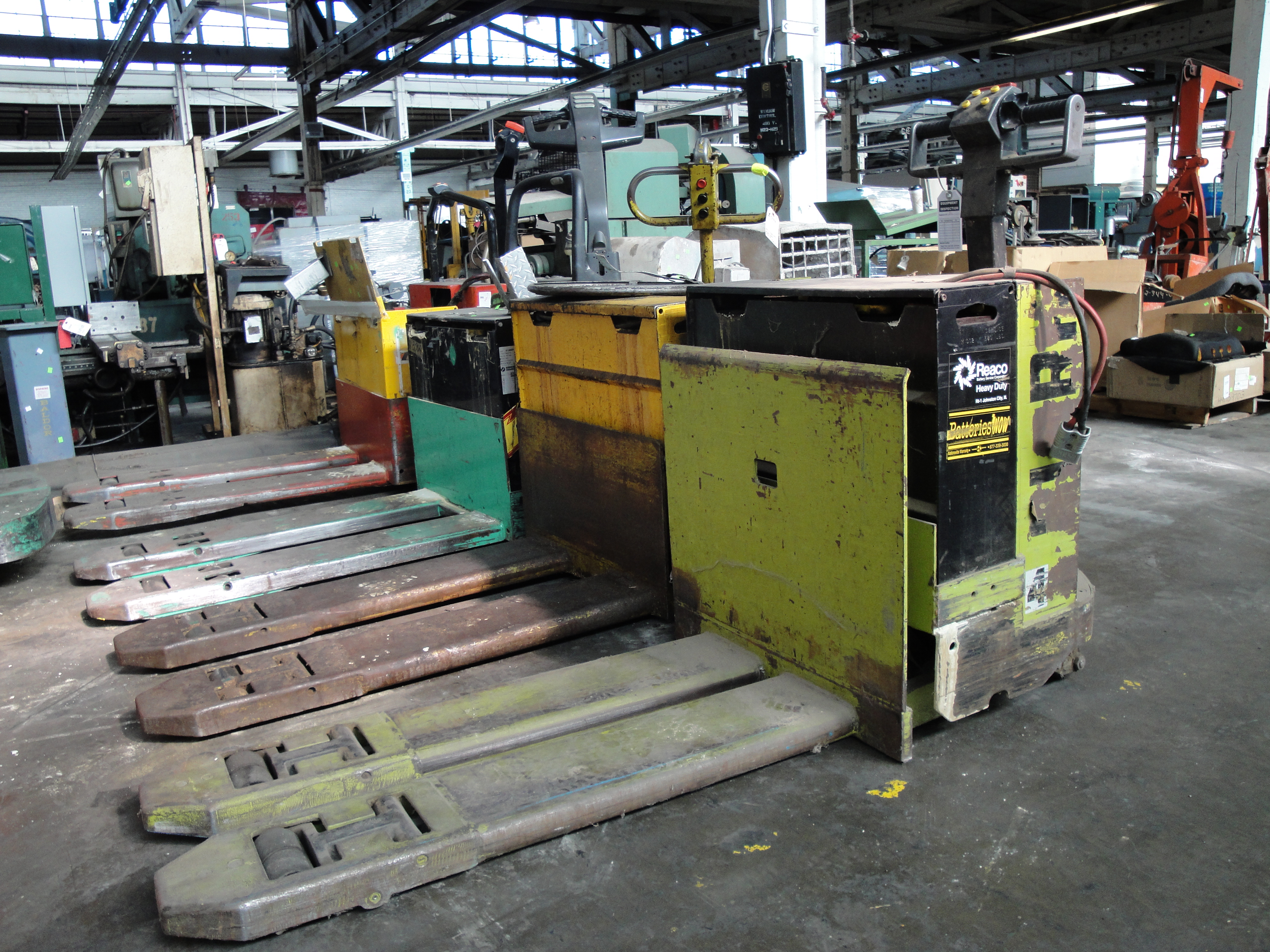
Electric pallet jacks

Both dock plates and dock boards have a diamond pattern embossed onto their upper surfaces to increase traction. Similarly, they both have locking T-bar legs that project into the gap between truck and dock to secure them. Due to their greater weight dock boards are generally transported and placed by fork lift.

== Dock leveler ==
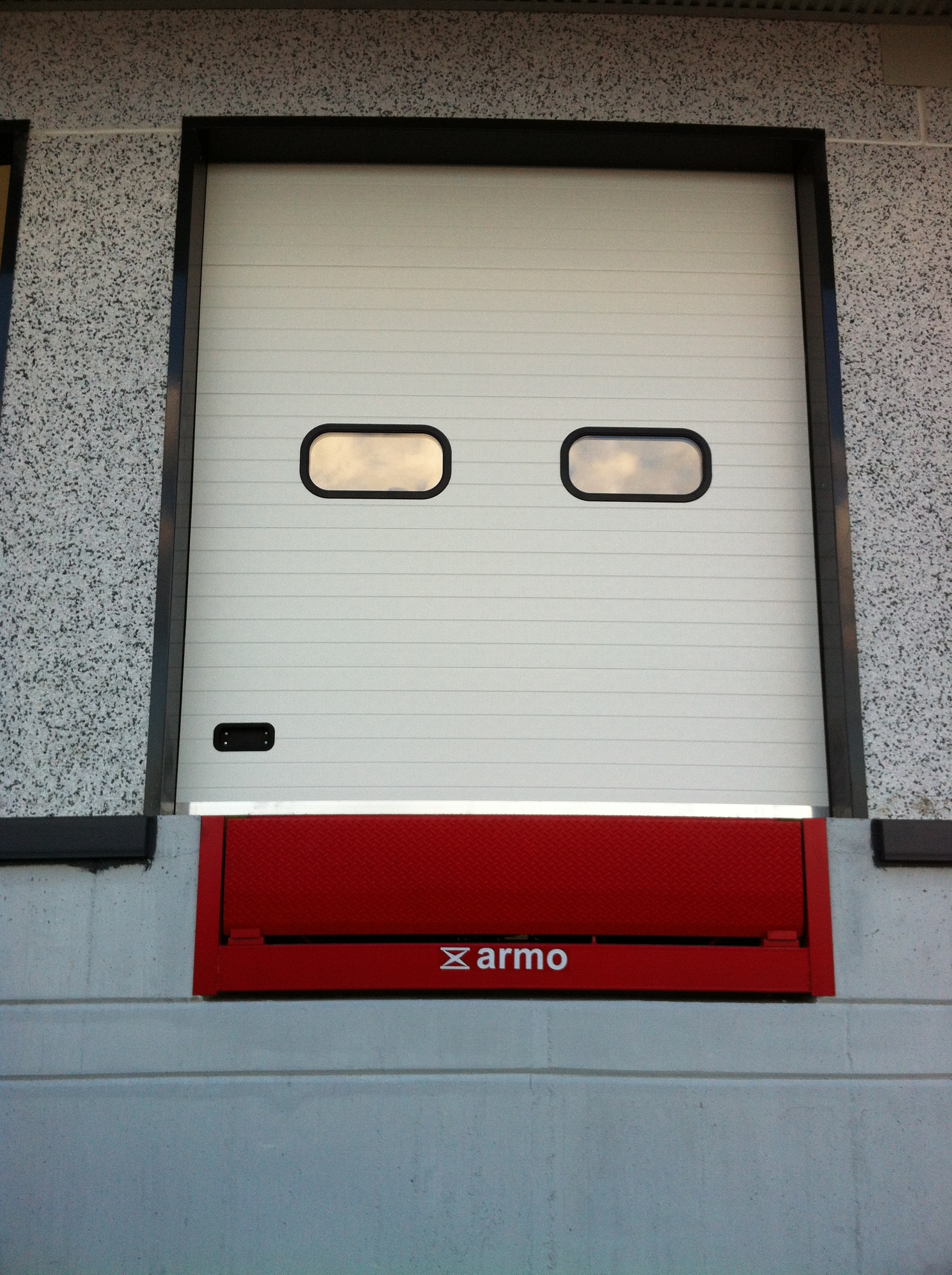
A dock leveler with hinged lip (in the stowed position)

Dock levelers are fixed to the dock. They comprise a simple metal plate, called a lip, that is raised from a stowed position and then lowered onto the back of the truck. Lip can be hinged or telescopic type. They are operated either manually, via a simple pull chain, or hydraulically, (most common) with an electric pump driving a piston to lift the plate and another one to move the lip.

Dock levelers are more expensive devices than the comparatively light-weight dock plates and dock boards. The most common form of dock leveler is the recessed, or pit, dock leveler. As the name suggests, this type of leveler is contained in a recess, or pit, beneath the dock door and floor surface. Dock levelers are stronger than dock plates and have similar ranges to dock boards, making them suitable not only for motorized fork lift trucks but also for master conveyors (for which neither dock plates or dock boards are suitable). Safety, also, is very high for this kind of product: Safety rules as EN1398 (European Standard) specifies the safety requirements for design, construction, installation, maintenance and testing of dock levelers and for safety components on dock levelers. NOTE: edge of dock levelers have fixed positions which have restricted ranges making them unsuitable for nonstandard dock heights.

Because they carry heavy motorized equipment, the grade of the incline has to be shallow. The greater the height differential between truck and dock that a dock leveler can compensate for, the longer the leveler itself has to be. Moreover, the grade of the incline must not be so great that the vehicles cannot climb it. A height differential of between 7 and 8 inches generally requires a 6-foot-long (1.8 m) leveler for an electric palette carrier. A height differential of between 17 and 18 inches generally requires a 12-foot-long (3.7 m) leveler for a petrol-engined fork lift truck. Anyway, the lip has to be considered in the length of the leveler, as it is part of it. A telescopic lip (20 or 40 inches) can help to reduce the length of the leveler to 10 feet.

Dock levelers (and indeed dock plates and dock boards) are used where a building has a truck-level door, i.e. a door with a floor level roughly at the same height as the floor of the truck's trailer. Some buildings only have drive-in doors, i.e. doors at the same level as the ground outside of the building, suitable for driving directly into the building.

== Lift ==
For loading docks with drive-in doors, and also (albeit rarely) for loading docks with truck-level doors, a lift is sometimes employed.

== Truck leveler ==
Other, less common, devices employed when bridging the gap between truck and dock are truck levelers. These are hydraulic lifts positioned beneath the rear wheels of the truck, that are used to raise and lower the truck so that it is level with the loading dock edge. The problems with truck levelers, that make them rarely employed, are twofold. First: They cause the truck interior to be at an incline, which causes loading and unloading difficulties. Second: They are expensive to maintain, since they require (being below ground level and open to the air) proper drainage and protection against the weather.
