= Philadelphia Doll Museum =

Museum in Philadelphia, Pennsylvania, USA

- Established: 1988
- Location: 2253 North Broad Street, Philadelphia, Pennsylvania, United States
- Coordinates: 39.98766°N 75.15567°W
- Director: Barbara Whiteman

The Philadelphia Doll Museum is located in Philadelphia at 2253 North Broad Street along the Avenue of the Arts. It is the only known museum in the United States that emphasizes the collection and preservation of black dolls as artifacts of history and culture.

== History ==
The museum was founded by Barbara Whiteman in 1988. She is an avid collector of black dolls, and a believer in researching and preserving black history. Whiteman says that the dolls she has collected are “more than play objects or toys; these Black dolls symbolize the struggle for freedom and human dignity. Each doll has a message of truth and strength that is important to the psychological and sociological development of Black people. Collectively, they present visual images of how Black people were perceived throughout world history.”

The museum has over 300 dolls on display with a permanent collection of approximately 1,000 dolls. The dolls include documentation and stories about how black people have been perceived throughout history and range in size from small figurines to full-size figures.

The Philadelphia Doll Show is the main event of the Philadelphia Doll Museum, used to bring doll collectors, in particular black doll collectors, together with doll makers in order to create a market and place value on black dolls.

The Museum offers lectures on the history of black dolls, and the black doll as a teaching tool. It also offers workshops in paper doll making and clothes pin doll making for children. Cloth doll making workshops for adults are also available. Additionally, the museum is an informal adult doll club for doll collectors and makers.

The museum was mentioned in Doll Reader's Top 10 Museums Worth a Visit in August 2011. The museum offers a comprehensive look at the evolution of black dolls.

== Founder ==
Barbara Whiteman is the founder and executive director of the Philadelphia Doll Museum. She developed her collection by studying Black history and culture. She travels across the country lecturing and presenting her collection. She says that these Black dolls are "More than play objects or toys, these Black dolls symbolize the struggle for freedom and human dignity. Each doll has a message of truth and strength that is important to the psychological and sociological development of Black people. Collectively, they present visual images of how Black people were perceived throughout world history.”

== Relationship to Philadelphia ==
The Philadelphia Doll Museum also serves as a meeting place for workshops about paper and clothes pin doll making for schools, churches, and cultural organizations. It also hosts lectures for the community about the history of black dolls, and the black doll as a teaching mechanism. Additionally, the Philadelphia Doll Museum hosts the Philadelphia Doll Society, which is an informal adult doll club for doll collectors and doll makers.

== See also ==
- African American culture
- Black doll
