= Golly Bar =

Former Irish ice cream bar

Originally launched in 1957 by HB Ice Cream (HB), the Golly Bar is an ice cream formerly sold exclusively in Ireland. It was a single rectangular block of vanilla ice cream on a wooden stick. The packaging of Golly Bars depicted an image of a golliwog, a 19th-century caricature of a blackface minstrel, which is now regarded as racist. The golliwog image was removed from the packaging in 1992. However, continued concern from the manufacturers over any racist connotations saw a name change to the Giant Bar.

Giant Bars remain available for purchase across the Republic of Ireland though reorganisation of the HB brand by corporate parent Unilever saw the production and ownership of the Giant Bar Brand move to Northern Ireland company Dale Farm.

== See also ==
- List of frozen dessert brands
