= Natasha doll =

Stress relief toy

Natasha is a term for a style of squishy baby doll marketed as a stress reliever in countries such as China. Although the dolls are available in multiple colors, the most popular one appears to be black. The product, and social media videos featuring it, have drawn criticism for promoting harmful behaviors and anti-black racism. Some of the dolls reportedly contain high levels of hazardous substances like formaldehyde.

== History ==
According to Chinese state media Xinhua and international news outlets, the trend originated with a vlogger who jokingly treated the stress-relief toy as his daughter, naming her "Natasha." After a clip of the vlogger accidentally dropping the toy went viral, a wave of copycat videos followed, and the name stuck to the product across various e-commerce platforms.

== Trend ==
Videos featuring Natasha dolls often depict the doll being stretched, squeezed, or otherwise treated violently.

=== Backlash ===
Comments from social media users stating that black Natasha dolls were chosen over lighter skinned Natasha dolls due to the latter being "more human-like" or "too human" drew attention and criticism. The China Consumers Association and State Administration for Market Regulation has removed some violent videos featuring Natasha dolls. Some observers have compared the controversy surrounding the dolls to a trend in which real-life African children were mistreated in videos intended for Chinese social media audiences.
