= Bleuette =

French doll

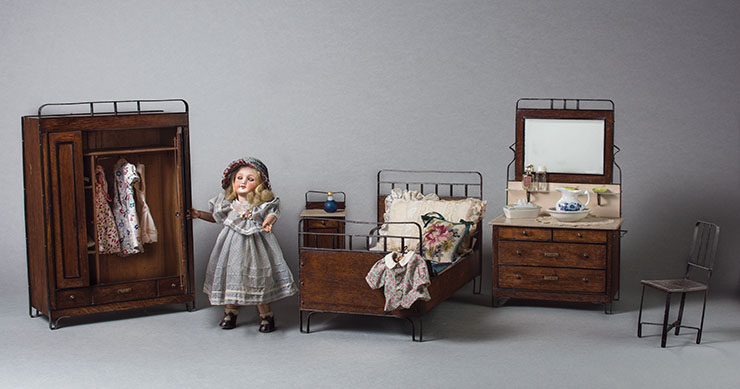
A Bleuette doll from the 1930s on display at the Isaac Fernández Blanco Museum, Buenos Aires.

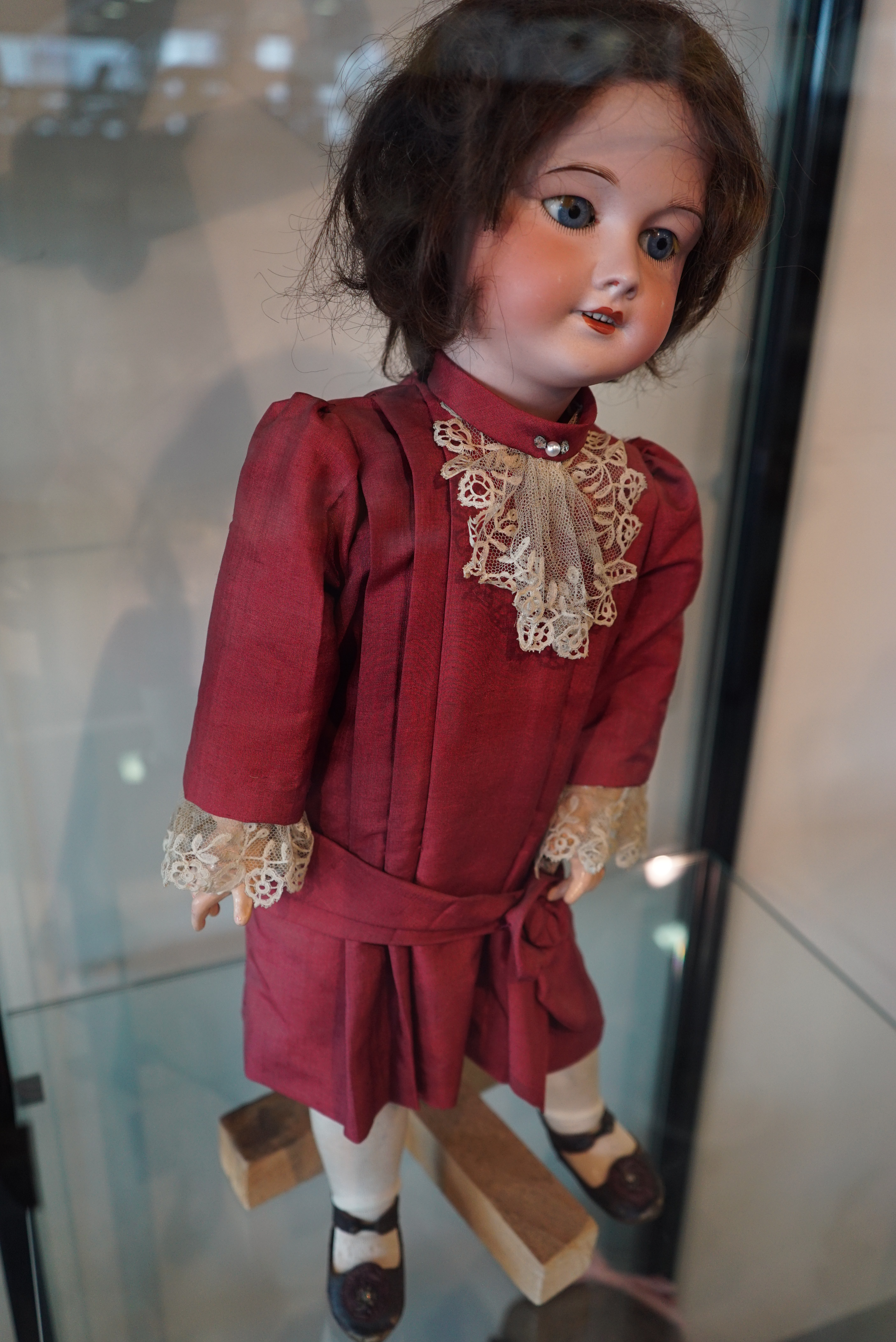
Museum in Rheims

Bleuette is a doll that was produced from 1905 to 1960 in France and was available to readers of the girls' magazine La Semaine de Suzette, or the English version, "Suzette's Week".

== Overview ==
Bleuette has a fully jointed composition body. She was 27 cm (10" 5/8) tall until 1933, then 29 cm (11" 3/8) until production ended in 1960. She had a bisque head until World War II, then a composition head until 1958, when a hard plastic body and head were used for the last two years of production. The magazine came out weekly and included patterns for the doll. More than 1,060 patterns were published over the 55 years Bleuette was available.

The first Bleuette dolls are known as "Premiere Bleuette", and were given free to those who had placed an order for a year's subscription to La Semaine de Suzette before its first publication in February 1905. They were available only for one month after the first issue. 20,000 Jumeau dolls were ordered from the Société Française de Fabrication de Bébés et Jouets (S.F.B.J.) for the initial advertisement, but 60,000 subscriptions were received, and this first supply of dolls was gone before the first issue was even released.

Over the years, the doll was given a younger sister, Benjamine, in 1926, which was on the market for a short time, and then a baby brother, Bambino, in 1928. An older sister, Rosette, was her companion in her last years between 1955 and 1960.

She served as an inspiration for other composition dolls, such as the Argentine Marilú, which in turn inspired the Spanish Mariquita Pérez.

The doll is popular with modern doll collectors for its size and the vast assortment of patterns available, spanning 55 years of fashion trends. During World War I, there were Red Cross nurse outfits, Tipperary outfits, aviator outfits, automotive outfits, skating and ski outfits. Many designers over the years contributed to the design of the Bleuette doll's wardrobe. Jeanne Lanvin was especially noted as a contributor. Well-known artists drew the illustrations for the catalogues, and they are collected today. Noted are Manon Iessel and Maggie Salcedo. Joseph Pinchon drew the comical Bécassine, which was turned into a companion doll for Bleuette. La Semaine de Suzette also included patterns for an assortment of furniture that could be made from cardboard. Furniture was available for the doll through the offices of the publisher. Also available at the offices was a repair shop for broken dolls as well as new heads and wigs.

The publishers of La Semaine de Suzette were devout Catholics and wished to find a way to get the Christian message into French homes. The home arts that young girls learned were intended to teach them to be good mothers and good Christian French wives. There were patterns for bridal dresses and Christening gowns in the magazine, and a Holy Communion dress was available through the publishing offices and catalogues.
