= Pierre-François Jumeau =

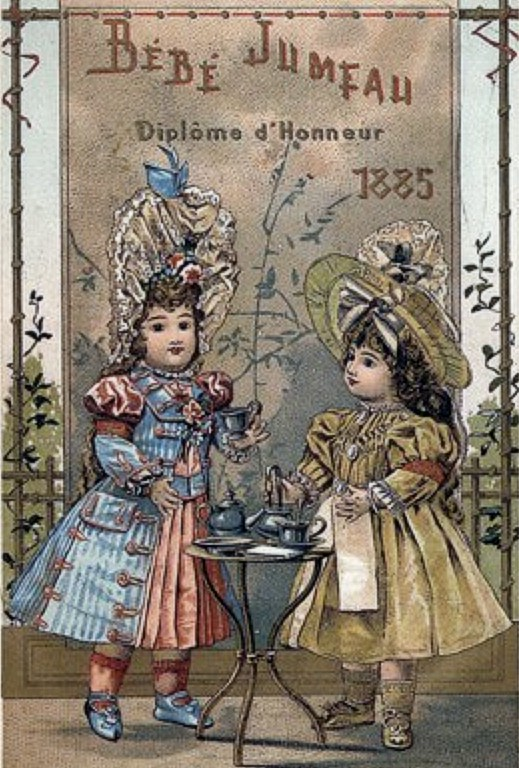
- Advert produced by Maison Jumeau
- Born: Pierre-François Jumeau; 31 October 1811; Rémalard
- Died: 13 August 1895 (aged 83); Longny-au-Perche
- Occupation: Doll Maker
- Children: Emile-Louis Jumeau

Pierre-François Jumeau (31 October 1811 Rémalard – 13 August 1895 Longny-au-Perche), was the founder of Jumeau. Jumeau was an 1840s French firm that produced bisque dolls and china dolls. His second son Emile-Louis Jumeau, born in 1843, began assuming management of the company in the 1870s.

Pierre-François's family owned a fabric shop in Rémalard, south-west of Paris, in 1837. On a business trip to Paris he met and eventually married in January 1841 the niece of one of the few dollmakers in France, Lucius-Junius Herissey. Jumeau gained invaluable experience by joining the Herissey business, which had good prospects due to the improved French economy and the growth of international markets.

In 1841 Jumeau was in partnership with Louis-Desire Belton, but started his own business a few years later after the death of his wife in 1844. By 1848 Jumeau had become the foremost doll manufacturer, had won a bronze medal at the 1849 Paris Exposition and was invited in 1851 to take part in the Crystal Palace Exhibition in London where he won a First Place Medal, the dresses being singled out for praise. The Jumeau dolls were widely acclaimed, winning numerous awards at international exhibitions. The first dolls were papier-mâché and were unmarked, causing present-day attribution problems, so that only a small number of Jumeau dolls made before the 1870s can be identified with certainty. In the 1850s glazed porcelain dolls had been added to the firm's inventory, but the bisque dolls were its greatest success, and the company acquired a reputation for the beauty, grace, elegance and quality of its products.

In 1872, Pierre-François, unhappy with the dolls' heads from Germany, started a porcelain factory at Montreuil to produce his own heads and began supplying other dollmakers.

From his marriage to Adèle Amélie Aumoitte, Pierre-François produced two children, Georges Eugène (1841–1873) and Emile (born 18 April 1843). Adèle died on 16 May 1843 following Emile's birth. In 1854, Pierre-François married Adélaïde Elisa Mayo who died in 1888.

== Emile-Louis Jumeau ==
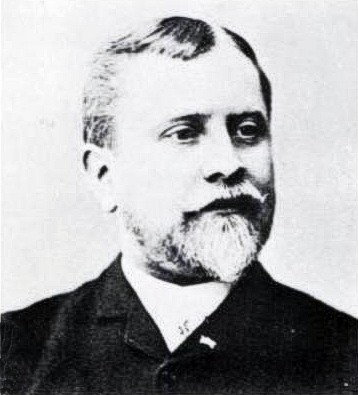
Emile-Louis Jumeau c.1890

Jumeau's second son Emile-Louis, born in 1843, who built the Château Jumeau or Villa Jumeau in Longny-au-Perche in 1866, began assuming management of the company and in 1877 he introduced the Bébé Incassable, with a head made by Jumeau, the face of a young girl and a fully articulated composition body. Jumeau's dolls were fashionably dressed in the styles popular at the time, and often had shapely mature figures. As with modern Barbie dolls, large ranges of clothing styles and accessories were made available. In 1878 the company was awarded a gold medal at the Paris Exhibition, an honour which was proudly advertised on all their products. Further awards followed at the International Exhibitions in Sydney in 1879 and Melbourne in 1880. In 1885, at the Antwerp Exhibition, Jumeau's dolls won the Diplôme d’Honneur, an award subsequently commemorated by being stamped on every doll made. The golden age of the company spanned the period from the late 1870s to the late 1890s when the company employed over 200 workers with an annual output of 100 000 dolls.

Emile-Louis' expansion into the international market pushed sales to new heights. In 1879 the Emperor's sculptor, Albert-Ernest Carrier-Belleuse was commissioned by Jumeau to fashion an epicene head, to be used as that of either boy or girl. Carrier-Belleuse is reputed to have used a portrait of King Henry of Navarra at age four as model and the design became known as Jumeau Triste. Emile-Louis becomes a Knight of the Légion d’Honneur in 1889. Henri Lioret, a French watchmaker and pioneer in the manufacture of talking machines, helps the firm develop Bébé Phonographe, the talking doll in 1894.

The plant at Montreuil outside Paris put together the finely featured heads with glass eyes, composition bodies (originally wood or kid-leather) with jointed limbs and articulated fingers. Here they also produced hats, gloves, shoes, muffs, stockings and underwear for the dolls. Emil-Louis' wife, Ernestine Jumeau, working from the Rue Pastourelle, decided on designs and fabrics that would complete the elaborate costumes that made the Jumeau firm's dolls a household word.

French dollmakers were eventually forced to close down by cheaper German dolls appearing on the market in the 1890s. As a final attempt at economic survival, they joined forces as the Société Française de Fabrication de Bébés et Jouets (SFBJ). When the Jumeau company finally wound up its business in 1899, the remaining stock was taken over by the SFBJ. This included large numbers of bébés, heads, bodies, costumes and other components, making attribution to Jumeau or SFBJ extremely difficult of dolls turned out during the transition period.

Jumeau dolls are usually marked with a simple number, although the body may also be stamped. The Tete Jumeau is marked 'Depose Tete Jumeau' behind the head. The Jumeau models included Deposes, E. J. Bébés, Triste, Portrait Bébé, Poupée de Modes, Bébé Phonographe and Tete Jumeau Bébés. Some of the earlier models are much sought-after and reproduction of Jumeau dolls supports a thriving industry.

== Bibliography ==
- The Jumeau Doll – Margaret Whitton; J. Kent Campbell (illustrator) (Dover Publications, 1980) ISBN 978-0-486-23954-5 ISBN 0486239543
- The Beautiful Jumeau – François Theimer (English edition edited by Florence Theriault) (Gold Horse Publishing, 1997) ISBN 0-912823-71-2 ISBN 978-0912823713
- The Encyclopedia of French Dolls – François & Danielle Theimer (English edition edited by Florence Theriault)
