= Simon & Halbig =

German porcelain and doll manufacturing company

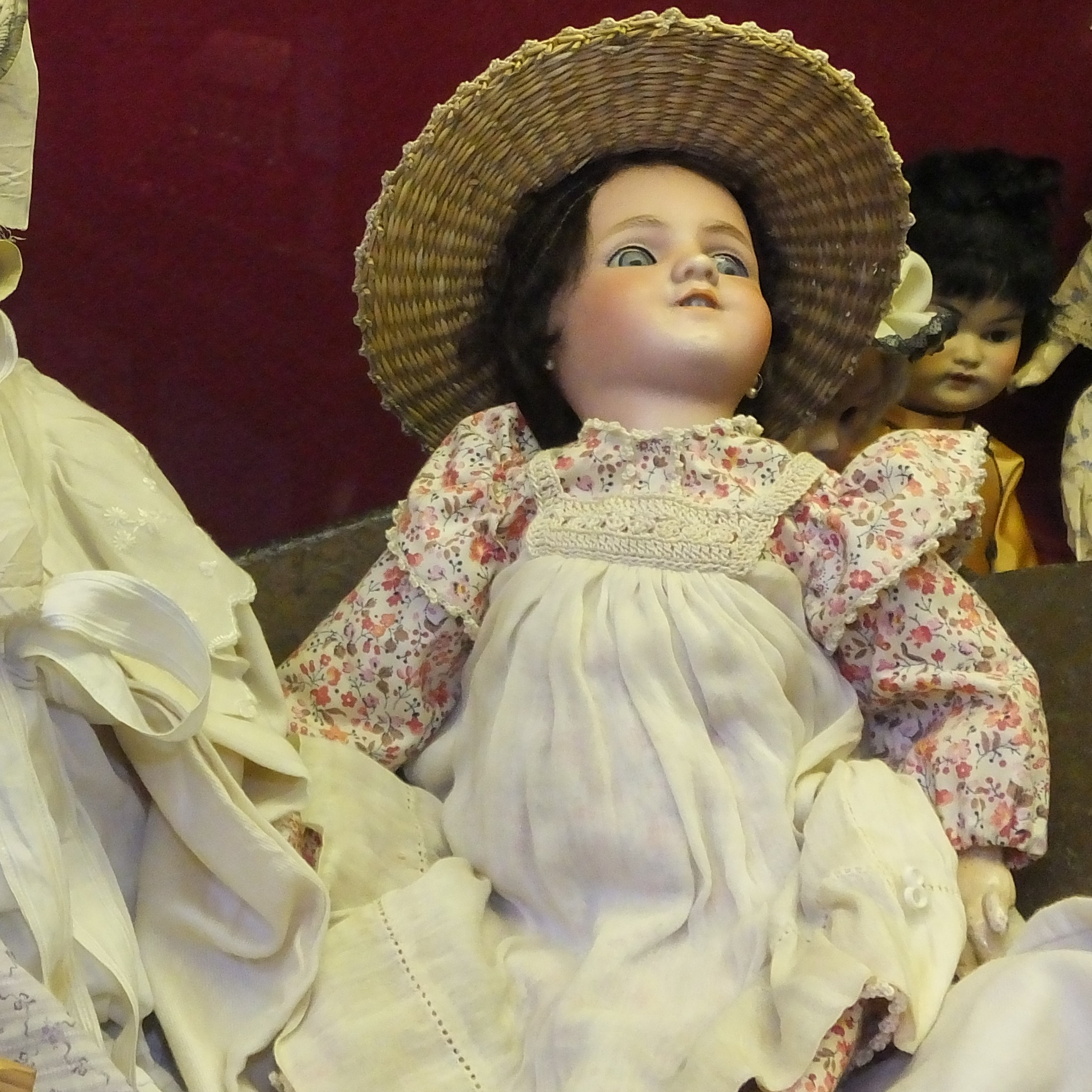
Doll from the collection of the Guildhall Museum in Rochester, Kent

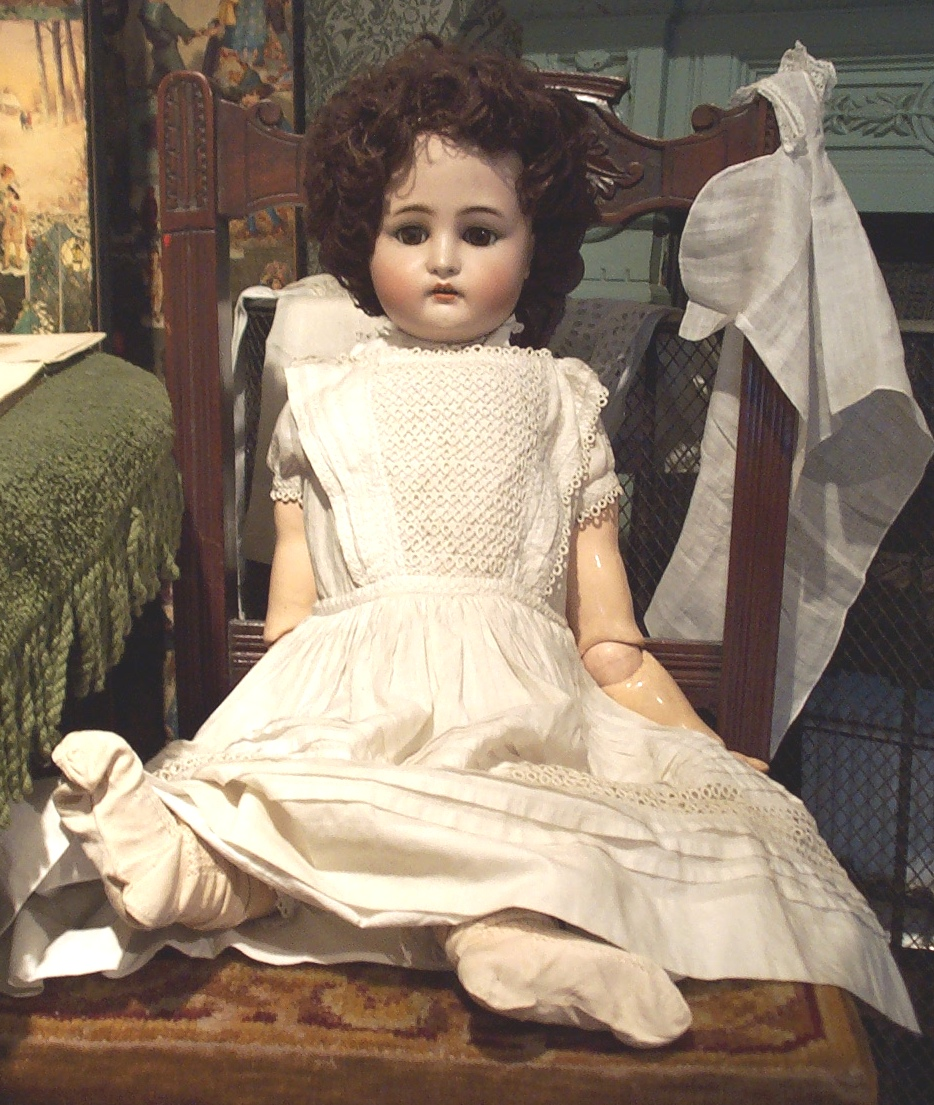
A Kämmer & Reinhardt doll with a Simon & Halbig bisque head

Simon & Halbig was a doll manufacturer known for bisque doll heads with subtle colouring. They were based in Thuringia, the centre of the German doll industry. They supplied doll heads to many other well known doll makers. These are now collectables.

== Description ==
Bisque or biscuit porcelain is unglazed porcelain with a matte finish, giving it a realistic skin-like texture. It is usually tinted or painted a realistic skin color. The bisque head is attached to a body made of cloth or leather, or a jointed body made of wood, papier-mâché or composition, a mix of pulp, sawdust, glue and similar materials. Many, like Simon & Halbig, came from the Thuringia region, which has natural deposits of the clay used to make the dolls.

Simon & Halbig was known for excellent sculpting of their doll heads, and the high quality of their bisque (porcelain).

German childlike dolls were predominantly produced between 1890 and 1930.

Examples of these dolls can be found in the Barry Elder collection in the Judges' Lodgings Museum, Lancaster

== History ==
Simon & Halbig was founded in 1869 and began making dolls in their two porcelain factories in Gräfenhain and Hildburghausen in Thuringia, Germany.

In 1902 they started a co-operation with Kämmer of Kämmer & Reinhardt in which Kämmer modelled heads and the firm produced them. The heads of the dolls completed by Kämmer & Reinhardt, attached to bodies and legs of more durable composition, were stamped with the marks of both firms. In 1920, Simon & Halbig was bought by Kämmer & Reinhardt, who continued to produce dolls until 1932. The factory became known as Keramisches Werk Gräfenhain.

== Companies using Simon & Halbig heads ==
American firms

- Arranbee Doll Company
- Bawo & Dotter
- George Borgfeldt
- Edison Phonograph Toy Manufacturing Company
- Gimbel Brothers
- Strobel & Wilken
- John Wanamaker

German firms

- C.M. Bergmann
- Gebrüder Bing
- Carl Bergner
- Cuno & Otto Dressel
- Eekhoff
- Hamburger & Co
- Heinrich Handwerck
- Adolf Hülß
- Kämmer & Reinhardt
- Louis Linder & Sohn
- Franz Schmidt
- FAO Schwarz
- Schoenau & Hoffmeister
- Wagner & Zetzsche
- Welsch & Co
- Wiesenthal, Schindel & Kallenberg
- Adolf Wislizenus

French-German firms

- Fleischmann & Bloedel

French firms

- Jumeau
- Roullet & Decamps
- S.F.B.J.

== See also ==
- Bisque doll
