= Édouard François Zier =

French illustrator and painter

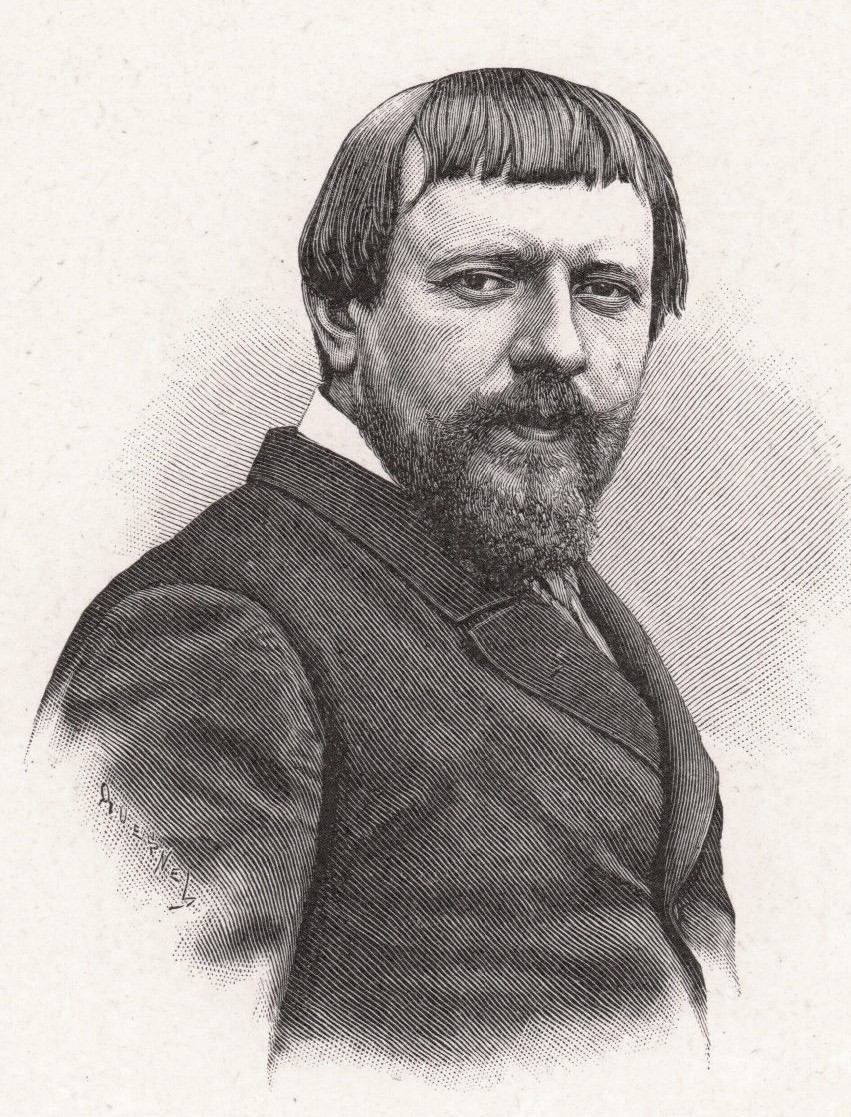
- Édouard Zier — wood-engraving by Désiré Quesnel
- Born: Édouard François Zier; 1856; Paris, France
- Died: 19 January 1924 (aged 67–68); Thiais, France
- Notable work: Illustration, Three Musketeers

Édouard François Zier (1856 – 19 January 1924) was a French illustrator and painter.

== Life and works ==
Édouard François Zier was born in Paris in 1856. He received his instructions in art from his father Victor Casimir Zier and later became a pupil of the painter Jean-Léon Gérôme.

His first painting, Mort de Caton d'Utique ("Death of Cato"), was exhibited at the Salon of 1874. Charles VI et Odette appeared at the 1880 Salon; these two paintings and also Esther (1883) were purchased by the French State. His Julia (Julie, 1875) on a Roman theme was shown at the 1876 Philadelphia Exposition and was awarded a gold medal.

Zier is known foremost however as an illustrator, for a wide variety of genres.

He has illustrated for a number of periodicals, such as L'Illustration, Le Monde illustré, Le Courrier français, and Le Journal de la jeunesse.

Two of the adventures of the comic book series Bécassine (1917 and 1918) were illustrated by Zier while the original artist Joseph-Porphyre Pinchon served in World War I.

A number of published books were illustrated by him, such as The Three Musketeers by Alexandre Dumas, Aphrodite by Pierre Louÿs, Le Roman comique by Scarron, La cantiniére du XIIIe siècle by Georges Le Faure, Les Trésors de la fable by Auguste Louvet, Voyages et aventures du Capitaine Marius Cougourdan by Eugène Mouton, Seulette and Le Trésor de Madeleine by Pierre Maël, A l'abordage by Henry de Brisay, Papillonne by Zénaïde Fleuriot.

He died in Thiais on 19 January 1924.

== Gallery ==
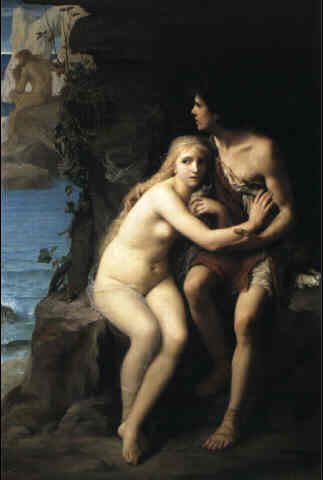
Acis et Galatée, Acis and Galatea hide from Polyphemus
1877

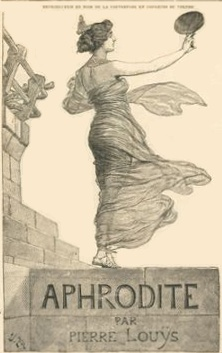
Aphrodite: mœurs antiques
1900

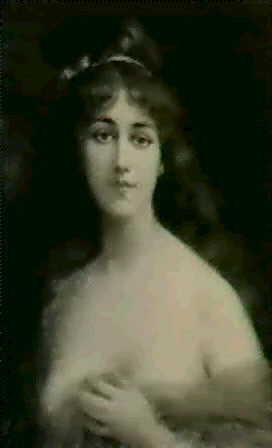
Portrait idéal
1903

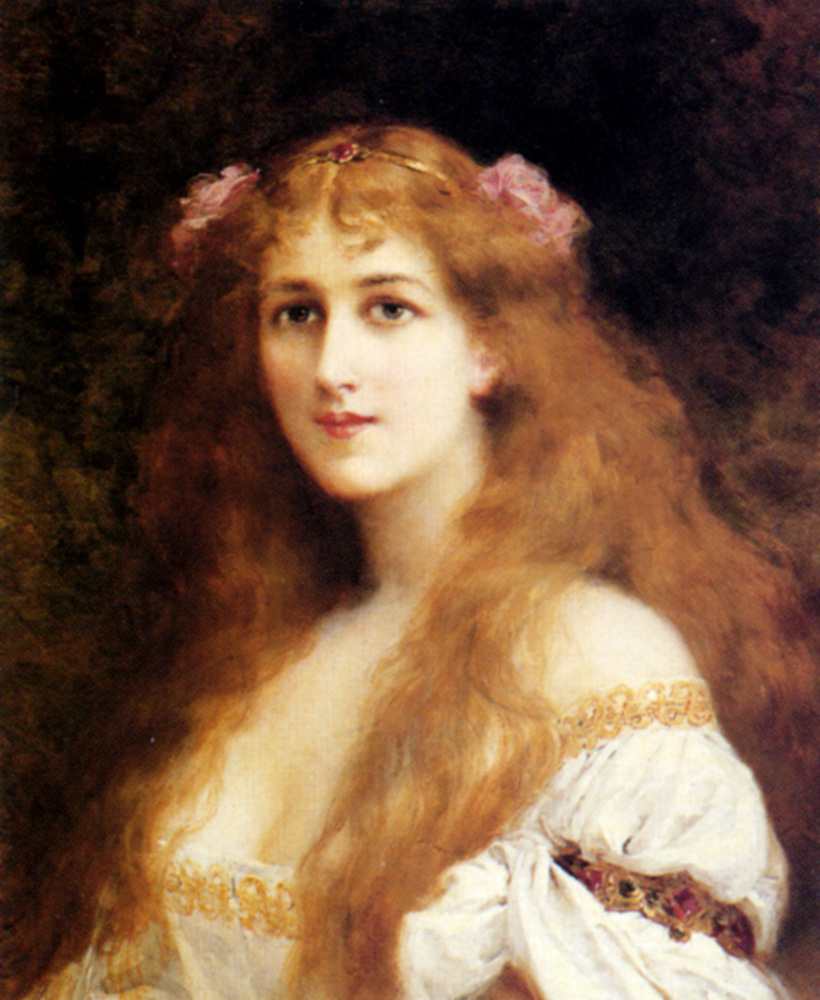
Ophelia
1904

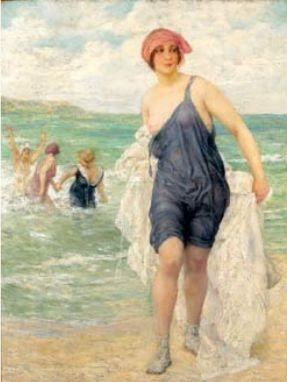
Les Baigneuses à Biarritz
