= Marilú (doll) =

Argentine doll produced between 1932 and 1960

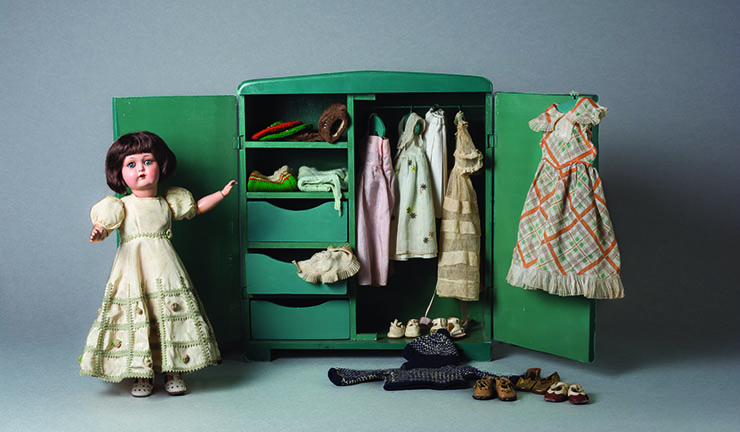
- Marilú doll from c. 1936–1939 with her wardrobe and clothes, manufactured by the German firm König & Wernicke. Isaac Fernández Blanco Museum, Buenos Aires
- Type: Doll
- Company: Kämmer & Reinhardt (1932–c. 1935); König & Wernicke (c. 1936–1939); Bebilandia (1940–1960)
- Country: Argentina
- Availability: 1932–1960
- Materials: Composition
- Features: Ball-jointed body

Marilú was an Argentine composition doll produced between 1932 and 1960, considered the most prominent and enduring doll in the country, and an icon in the history of national toys. It was created by Alicia Larguía, who was inspired by the French predecessor of Bleuette, a doll available through the famous magazine for girls La Semaine de Suzette. Seeking to replicate this model, Larguía launched Marilú in association with Editorial Atlántida, which was responsible for publishing advertisements and clothing patterns for the doll in its children's magazine Billiken, the most widely distributed in Latin America at the time. In view of the doll's immediate success, Atlántida also published a weekly magazine for girls, Marilú, between 1933 and 1936. The doll was originally imported from Germany, manufactured by the firm Kämmer & Reinhardt. Sometime between 1935 and 1936, Larguía changed suppliers and began to order the dolls from König & Wernicke, which was also German. During its first two years, Marilú was sold in an Atlántida store in Buenos Aires. The doll was sold along with a variety of other products, such as clothing, accessories and furniture. In 1934, Larguía became independent from the publishing house and opened her iconic store—Casa Marilú—on Florida Street, which in addition to selling the doll and its accessories, functioned as a prestigious prêt-à-porter fashion house for girls and young women.

After the outbreak of World War II in 1939, Marilú was manufactured entirely in Argentina by Bebilandia, one of the first national doll factories. The new firm produced a wide variety of models in addition to Marilú, among which the baby doll Bubilay— which was presented as Marilú's younger brother and also featured numerous accessories—stood out. After experiencing a period of splendor in the 1940s, in the following decade Bebilandia's products began to be eclipsed by those of other national firms, although Marilú and Bubilay maintained their position as the most popular among little girls. However, the new plastic dolls gained ground in the industry until they definitively imposed themselves, causing the cessation of production of Marilú and the other Bebilandia products around 1960. The Casa Marilú fashion house continued operating under the name Marilú Bragance until the early 1980s.

Marilú was a great commercial success during its years of existence, idolized by the upper middle-class girls of Argentina in the 1930s, 1940s and 1950s. Advertisements and texts published in the Billiken and Marilú magazines constructed a narrative around the doll, promoting a bourgeois lifestyle and a prescribed form of femininity, and also contributed to the shaping of girls as consumers. Although the primary aim of the doll's concept was, on the one hand, to transmit motherhood to girls, who were affectionately referred to as the doll's "mommies" (known as mamitas in Spanish), its connection with fashion and attire also held a significant role: advertisements actively encouraged girls to regularly update and refresh the doll's wardrobe to align with various occasions and seasons. The Billiken and Marilú magazines also included sewing patterns for girls or their family members to craft the doll's clothing, as well as instructional texts and fashion tips to assist in this endeavor. As a result, Marilú can be classified as a fashion doll and can be positioned within the lineage of other notable dolls like the more contemporary Barbies. Marilú served as an inspiration for other dolls, such as the emblematic Mariquita Pérez of Spain. Today, Marilú dolls are regularly exhibited in different museums of Argentina and are a highly valued item among private collectors.

== History ==
=== 1932–1939: Origin and consolidation ===
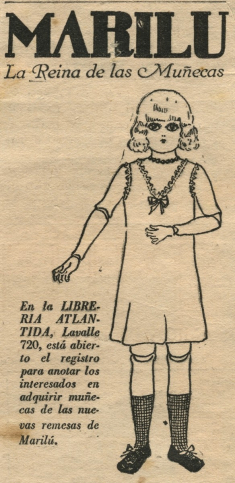
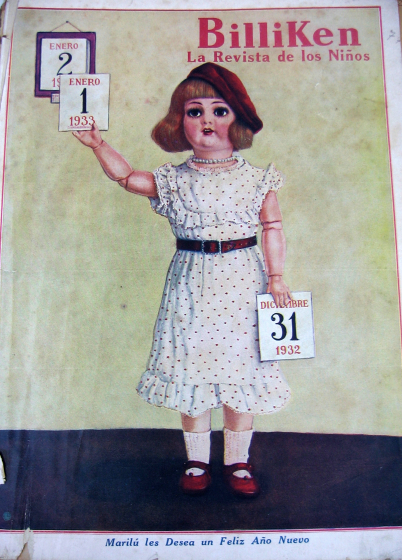
Advertisements for the first version of Marilú—manufactured by Kämmer & Reinhardt—published in Billiken magazine between 1932 and 1933.

Marilú was created by Alicia Larguía, a professor from high society, inspired by the French predecessor of Bleuette, a doll that the famous magazine for girls La Semaine de Suzette gave to its subscribers, in addition to publishing weekly patterns to sew clothes for her. Since there was no magazine for girls with these characteristics in Argentina, Larguía turned to the children's magazine Billiken—the one with the greatest circulation in Latin America at that time—since "it was close in format and ideology." The friendship between Larguía and the Virgil family, who owned the Editorial Atlántida that published Billiken, was decisive for Marilú's launching through the children's magazine. The doll was launched to the market in November 1932, and its first batches were sold in a section that Atlántida gave to Larguía in its store at 720 Lavalle Street, Buenos Aires. Billiken published advertisements and a weekly section of patterns so that girls—who were called "mommies" (in Spanish: mamitas)—could sew clothes for the doll, linking it definitively with the publishing house.

The first Marilu models were imported from Germany, which at that time had the absolute dominance in the export of toys, imposing itself on a French industry in decline. Larguía had a close relationship with this country, as it was the birthplace of her mother Alma Schell and her first daughter, María Luisa, from whom she took the name for the doll. During her trips to Germany, she visited the Leipzig Trade Fair on more than one occasion, where she commissioned the German firm Kämmer & Reinhardt to create the doll. This first Marilu model is the composition version of one of the most famous models of the company: Mein Liebling (in English: "my beloved"), which has been considered Germany's most iconic doll. Sometime in 1935 or 1936, Larguía changed suppliers and began ordering dolls from the German firm König & Wernicke, something that lasted until the end of the decade.

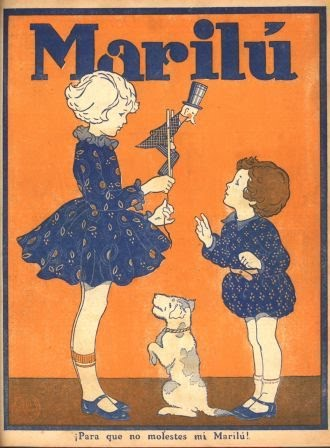
Cover of a 1935 issue of Editorial Atlántida's Marilú magazine, the doll's house organ between 1933 and 1936.

The release of Marilú was so successful that in March 1933 Larguía managed to culminate her project and assimilate it to the French precedent with the publication of its own magazine of the same name, which was edited weekly until 1936, and monthly throughout that year. Both the release of the doll and its house organ are prime examples of the crystallization of the recognition of children as a well-defined consumer group, something that had been in the making since the early 20th century. Through Marilú magazine, Larguía wrote directly to the girls who had her doll under the pseudonym "Tía Susana" (Spanish for "Aunt Susana"). She also formed the SDTS club (Sobrinitas de Tía Susana; in English: "Aunt Susana's little nieces"), through which the girls could write to each other, exchange figurines, sewing patterns and information about Marilú. According to researcher María Paula Bontempo: "In the same way that the launching of a product is considered today, it was not enough for it to be in the shop windows; it was necessary to put meanings into circulation in order to make it known, understand it and desire it. That is what the publication was about, providing 'scripts' where girls valued a 'legitimate' Marilú and molded them as consumers." After 1936, the magazine reappeared only sporadically and in different formats, alternating with Billiken the publication of patterns for her clothing.

According to researcher Daniela Pelegrinelli:

A world of fantasy was created around her, while at the same time a strong transmission of values took place, both of the bourgeois lifestyle and of an accepted type of femininity, emblematized by good taste in dress and the cultivation of virtues such as piety, discretion, elegance and sobriety. Born in the midst of the Conservative Restoration, contemporary of governments that emerged from violent elections marked by fraud, she grew up in tune with the absence of the majorities in the public sphere, during a period of the Catholic Church boom that reached its most complete expression with the Eucharistic Congress of 1934, an event in which the doll participated with a luxurious model called the Eucharistic Congress. However, flexible and diligent in adapting to changes, it knew how to become popular over the years.

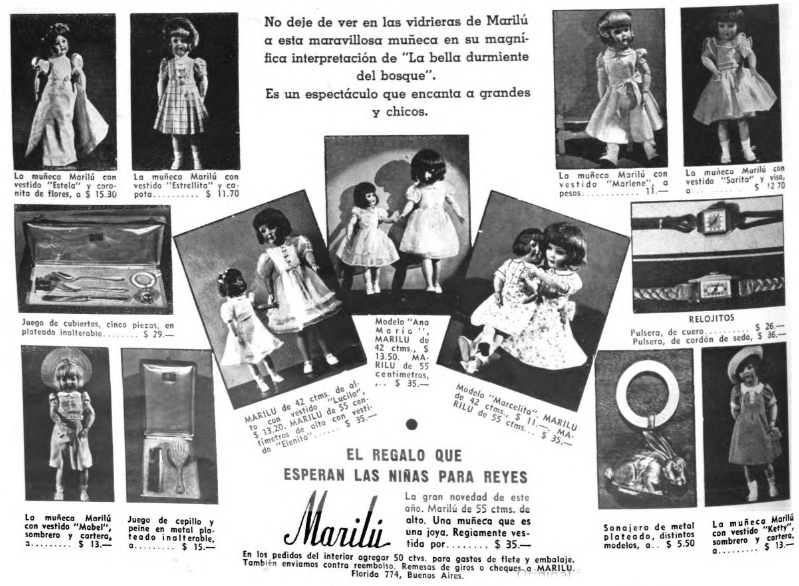
Advertisement published in Atlántida magazine in 1938 promoting the Marilú doll and the Casa Marilú store on 774 Florida Street.

In 1934, Larguía became independent from Atlántida and founded the iconic Casa Marilú, inaugurated on February 5 of that year. Pelegrinelli notes that Casa Marilu "displayed on a small scale the sophisticated universe of an ideal childhood: aviator and skater outfits, day and evening dresses, travel items, communion dresses, private school uniforms and dusters with portfolios, miniature objects, furniture sets of various styles, carnival costumes, and even a piano and a car were part of Marilu's possessions." The store was known for its elaborate window shop designs, which were regularly renewed and functioned as dioramas representing different situations, such as national scenes, classic stories or important social or cultural events.

Located at Florida Street 774, Casa Marilú was not only dedicated to selling the doll and its wide variety of accessories, but over the years it was also consolidated as a prestigious prêt-à-porter fashion house for girls. The firm's most characteristic garments were coats with velvet collars, while it had the singularity of offering matching models for mothers and their daughters. The seamstress and creative Sara Souto was the key figure in the operation of the fashion house: she assisted in the design of garments, participated in the trips to Europe to buy textiles and was in charge of decision making in the workshop. Souto's niece says that "Sara was very respected in the firm, she had a very large desk arranged in a space full of drawings, fabric clippings, papers with fashion magazines and daily work material. Another very important part of her area was the assembly of the fashion shows and the window shops".

=== 1940–1960: Argentine manufacturing ===
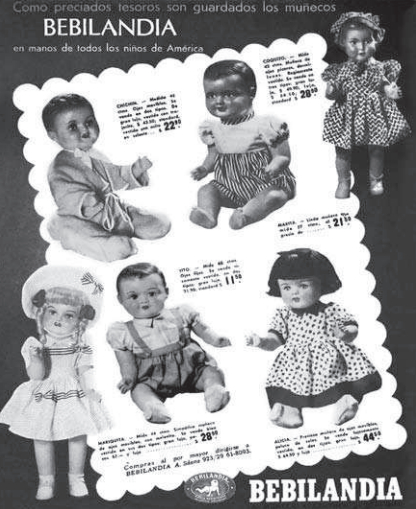
Bebilandia advertisement published in Billiken in 1944, promoting several products of the brand.

The outbreak of World War II in 1939 caused radical changes in the toy industry worldwide, as imports were almost completely stopped. In this context, the manufacture of Marilú began to take place entirely in Argentina, giving rise to the company Bebilandia, one of the first national doll factories. According to Pelegrinelli, Marilú's "prestige had reached a sufficient magnitude to support the opening of her own factory, a maneuver that, at the end of the 1930S, was very risky, due to the scarcity of both previous experience and suitable personnel to carry it out". The factory's first facilities were located at 555 Yatay Street, in the neighborhood of Almagro.

Since the arrival of the Argentine-manufactured Marilú, the constant advertising in Billiken began to highlight the local origin of the doll, resorting to nationalism as a sales strategy with messages such as: "Argentine girls: our industry has made one more effort for you. Contribute to this patriotic work by always asking for Bebilandia dolls"; or "Contribute to the progress of our homeland by playing with Argentine dolls". The launching of the new Marilú was announced in Billiken a few days before 25 May 1940, deliberately coinciding with the anniversary of the May Revolution. The ad showed the doll escorted by the Argentine flag, along with the message:

Marilú, the doll that no home should be without.
Wrapped in the folds of our flag, as a symbol of the continuous aggrandizement of our homeland, the first Marilú manufactured entirely in Buenos Aires excitedly greets the Argentine girls and those of all the countries of America.
Marilú has always been the favorite doll since she was born. Now her mommies can add to the affection they feel for her the pride of knowing that Marilú represents a true triumph of our national industry.

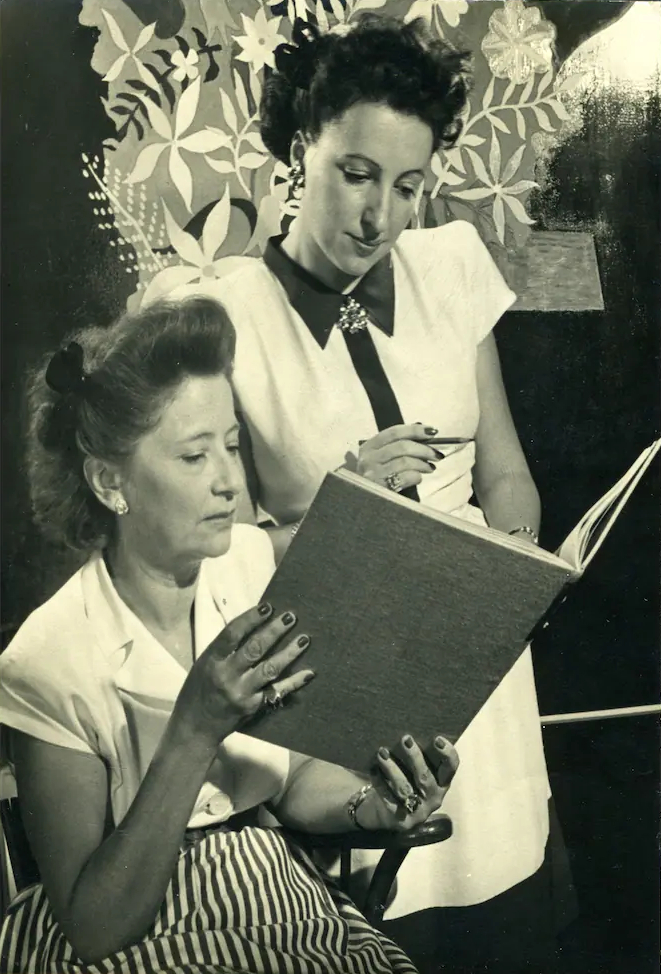
Alicia Larguía and Sara Souto, c. 1940s.

The Bebilandia firm was quickly consolidated. Not only did it manufacture the new local Marilú, but also a great variety of dolls of different types and sizes that were among the first in the Argentine industry. Among them, Bubilay, a baby doll introduced in 1940 and presented as the younger brother of Marilú, stood out. In August 1941, the factory moved to larger premises on Bogado Street, very close to the previous one. In 1943, Bebilandia reached its peak and moved to its definitive address: 923 Sáenz Avenue, in the neighborhood of Nueva Pompeya. From that moment on, all the production phases of the dolls were carried out in the industrial plant, including their clothing, which was not as elaborate as Marilú's in the 1930s but still superior to the rest of the national dolls that were beginning to appear in the market. The plant was managed by Lorenzo Dari Larguía, son of Alicia Larguía, who delegated some production phases to Esther Souto, Sara Souto's sister.

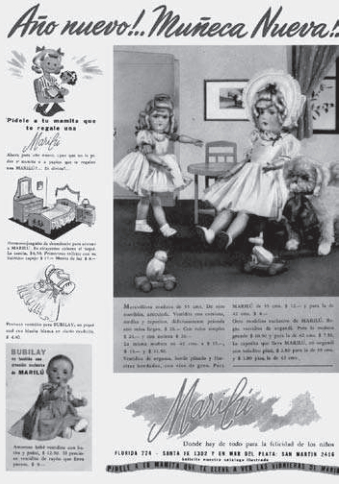
Advertisement for Marilú and Bubilay published in Billiken, 1952.

In 1946, the factory was renamed Muñecas y Plásticos Bebilandia and entrusted the firm Udavill with part of the commercialization of its products. The commercial partnership between Larguía and Constancio Cecilio Vigil—director of Atlántida—continued to be very close, and from the second half of the 1940s the characters created by the latter had a greater presence in Bebilandia and in Casa Marilú, where they were sold in the form of dolls and appeared in the designs of fabrics or embroidery. Throughout the 1940s, Bebilandia produced a wide variety of models, which reflected the importance and dominance of the firm, the most prominent in the country during the decade. In addition to Marilú and Bubilay, other dolls produced by Bebilandia were Pepito, Tito, Minguito, Chicín, Fifi, Carlitos, Titina, Alicia, Martita, Lita, Pebete, Bebita, Pompón, Coquito, Lolo and Lolita, Mariquita (formerly Periquita), Martita, Carmencita, Lucita, Pinita, Yiye and Pillín, among others.

During the 1950s, Marilú and Bubilay continued to be the favorite dolls of little girls, although Bebilandia's other products began to be eclipsed by other brands. The new plastic dolls—made of plastisol—were gaining ground in the industry until they definitively imposed themselves at the end of the decade, since this material had many advantages when it came to playing. Marilú also competed with dolls made of composition from other firms, such as Mariquita Pérez (with her version manufactured in Argentina) or Linda Miranda. Finally, around 1960 Larguía sold Casa Marilú to her partner Sara Souto, who decided to abandon doll production and dedicate herself fully to women's fashion, which meant the definitive closure of Bebilandia. Marilú's creator then decided to retire to a small town in Traslasierra, Córdoba, where she lived her last years. After the end of the doll's production, Casa Marilú continued as a fashion house under the name Marilú Bragance. The Souto family carried on the fashion house business until the mid-1970s, when they decided to sell the brand. Marilú Bragance continued to operate until the early 1980s.

== Characteristics ==
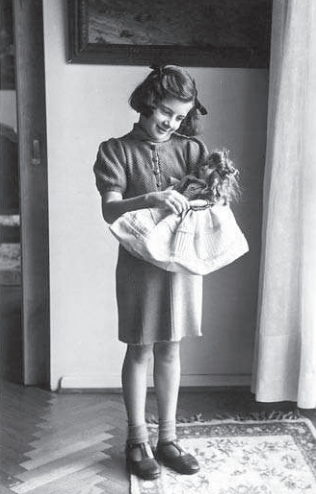
A girl playing with her Marilú doll, c. 1940s.

Marilú's design emulated the girls of the upper Argentine bourgeoisie of the time. Both the doll and the variety of products that were sold with it—clothing, accessories, and furniture—were characterized by their high quality. Pelegrinelli points out that in the 1940s, "no [Argentine] manufacturer was in a position to compete with the quality and good taste of these dolls." Despite some recurring confusion, it was not a porcelain doll at any time, but rather a composition doll, with an articulated body. Composition (in Spanish: composición or pasta, meaning "paste") is a "mixture formed by a substance and a binder, which, molded and dried, is used to produce hard pieces. (...) The base substance can be paper, sawdust, kaolinite and carbonate or different combinations on which its hardness, weight and malleability depend." In the mid-1950s, a new version of the doll with a plastic head was introduced.

The game proposed by Marilú revolved, on the one hand, around the transmission of motherhood to young girls, who referred to as the doll's "mommies"; although the doll's clothing also played a pivotal role. Advertisements encouraged girls to regularly change and update the doll's outfits based on occasions or seasons, effectively promoting the Marilú brand's accompanying clothing line. Moreover, both Billiken and Marilú magazines included sections that featured clothing patterns that girls or their family members could use to sew the doll's wardrobe; and also provided instructions and fashion tips for this purpose. These sections included style comments that were typical of fashion magazines, such as the right combination of colors or rules of good behaviour. This positioning aligns Marilú with the lineage of fashion dolls, akin to Gaultier dolls, Huret dolls, and more contemporary examples like Vogue dolls and Barbies.

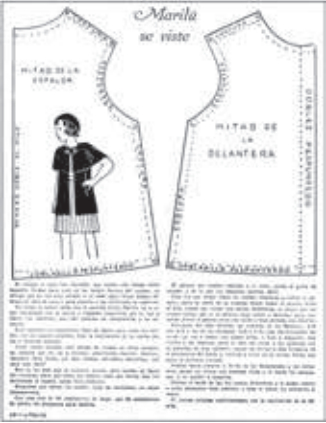
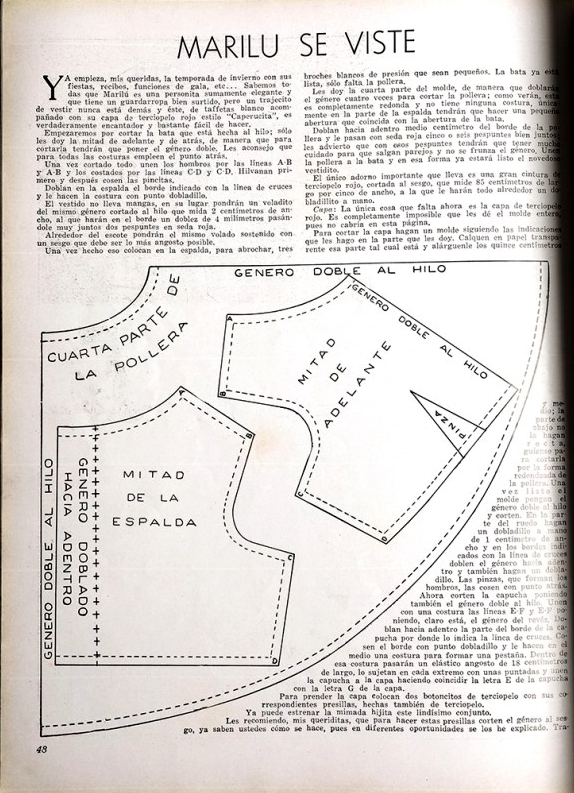
Patterns published in the Marilú magazine in the 1930s, which encouraged young girls to sew their doll's clothes with the latest fashions.

The early period Marilú, produced by the firm Kämmer & Reinhardt from 1932 to c. 1936, came with a mohair wig with a short mane of blond, brown or black hair. They are marked on the back of the neck with the typical Star of David that identified this factory, and the number 917, both incised. The earliest models in this group also include a stamp on the back with the inscription "Marilú Billiken" in blue ink, indicating that they were sold in the first few months of their launch at the Editorial Atlántida store. Other inscriptions include "Marilú" on the back, "Made in Germany" on the shoulder blade or "Marilú Trademark" on the back. Kämmer & Reinhardt's Marilú measures 40 centimeters and came with shirt, stockings and shoes.

Between c. 1936 and 1939, Marilú was manufactured by the also German König & Wernicke, and the dolls of this second period are identified by having longer thighs and more detailed shoulder blades and feet. They came in two different sizes: 42 or 50 centimeters. The König & Wernicke Marilú can also be identified by the markings incised on the back of the neck, which could be a combination of the three elements "K&W // Germany // 121/4/0" in different order; or the other inscription "4/0 // Germany // Marilú", which is interesting because it would indicate that the firm made a special model for Argentina.

From 1940 until its discontinuation in 1960, Marilú was manufactured in Buenos Aires by the firm Bebilandia. This new version made in Argentina introduced a "subtle change in skin tone from pink to citrine". The material of the Argentine-made Marilú was a paper pulp that resulted in "warm and light pieces", something that the manufacturers highlighted as one of the main advantages of the product; as for example in the Commercial and Industrial Dictionary of the Argentine Republic of 1942: "In its manufacture, only papier maché is used, which constitutes an advantage in relation to the imported dolls, since the mentioned paper reduces the weight of the toy and makes it much more affordable for export and for the handling of the children".

== Bibliography ==
- Pelegrinelli, Daniela (2010). Diccionario de juguetes argentinos. Infancia, industria y educación 1880-1965 (in Spanish). Buenos Aires: El Juguete Ilustrado Editores. ISBN 978-987-26042-0-2.
