= Mariquita =

Mariquita may refer to:

- Mariquita, Tolima, a municipality in the Tolima department of Colombia
  - Mariquita Airport, an airport serving Mariquita
- Mariquita Pérez, a 1938 Spanish doll designed by Leonor Coello de Portugal

== People ==
- Mariquita (dancer) (1830–1922), French choreographer

=== Given name ===
- Mariquita Gallegos (born 1940), Argentine singer and actress
- Mariquita Gill (1861–1915), American painter
- Mariquita Jenny Moberly (1855–1937), English artist, working in oil and watercolour
- Mariquita Sánchez (1786–1868), patriot from Buenos Aires
- Mariquita Tennant (1811–1860), Spanish-born social reformer

=== Characters ===
- Mariquita Samper, a fictional character in Giannina Braschi's Empire of Dreams (1988)
