= Jacqueline Rivière =

Pseudonym of French writer Jeanne Spallarossa

- Born: Jeanne Josephine Spallarossa; 8 May 1851; Brive-la-Gaillarde, France
- Died: 20 February 1920 (aged 68); Paris, France
- Other names: Bernard La Roche, Mrs. Bernard de Laroche, Bernard de Laroche, Mrs. Alexandre Bernhardt
- Occupations: Writer, newspaper editor-in-chief, and comics creator
- Spouse: Alexandre Bernhardt
- Children: Suzanne Rivière

Jacqueline Rivière (8 May 1851 – 20 February 1920) was the pseudonym of a French writer, newspaper editor-in-chief and creator of the successful comic strip Bécassine.

Born Jeanne Josephine Spallarossa, 8 May 1851 in Brive-la-Gaillarde, France, she signed her first novels under the pseudonyms Bernard La Roche, Mrs. Bernard de Laroche, Bernard de Laroche or Mrs. Alexandre Bernhardt. In 1902, she adopted the pen name of Jacqueline Rivière, by which she has become most widely known.

== Personal life ==
Jeanne Josephine's father was Jean Baptiste Spallarossa, an officer from Bastia on the French island of Corsica who was a Legion of Honor recipient. He married Elisabeth Marie Martine de Gilbert de Merlhiac in 1848. Jeanne Josephine had four siblings, brothers Nicolas Guillaume (b. Blois, 1849) and Edouard Jean Charles (b. Paris, 1863) and sisters Marie Elisabeth Augustine and Aimable Elizabeth Angèle (b. Colmar, 1854). Their father died in 1863.

On 7 June 1887 in Vincennes, France, Jeanne Josephine married a civil engineer and general insurance inspector Alexandre Bernhardt (b. 1832, Paris). Their daughter, named Suzanne (b. 1882), was five years old at the time. The couple divorced in 1899. (Their daughter also became a writer and published her work under the pseudonyms of Arlette de Maillane or Suzanne Rivière.)

== Writings ==
The writer was a prolific novelist before, during and after her marriage. She had come to know publisher Henri Gautier during that time and when he was ready to launch a new weekly newspaper for young well-to-do girls called La Semaine de Suzette (The Week of Suzette), he asked Rivière to take the helm as its first editor-in-chief. As part of that job, she created of the text comic series called Bécassine as well as a popular advice column, both published in her newspaper.

=== Comic creator ===
Jacqueline Rivière pronounced in French

According to the newspaper's archives, Rivière was having problems with the first issue on 2 February 1905; the pending newspaper had one empty page that had to be completed before the premiere edition could be sent off for printing. However, the author of the piece that was scheduled to be placed there had fallen ill, and as editor-in-chief Rivière searched for something to fill the blank space. As David Hopkin says, it is believed that she quickly wrote the text for a new comic strip that would become exceedingly popular about a simple house maid named Bécassine who had come to Paris from the Brittany region of northwestern France and was helping with dinner preparations.

“According to an oft repeated story, [the character’s] origin lay in an actual blunder made by the Breton maid of the magazine’s editor, Jacqueline Rivière. As depicted in that first 1905 issue, Bécassine is given orders to notify the marchioness [the lady of the house] when a lobster is delivered for the evening’s dinner party. But as Bécassine does not know what a lobster is, the marchioness tells her that it is red, that she is to check if it is fresh and to put it in the kitchen. Instead, Bécassine puts the dinner guests, four colonial officers in their red uniforms, in the kitchen, and informs the marchioness that there are three little lobsters and one large one (the colonel), but that the latter is not quite fresh!”

Rivière asked a painter, Joseph Pinchon (1871-1953), to illustrate her first comic titled The Mistake of Bécassine and it was he who drew the young woman whose mouth, when she had one, was only a point. Newspaper readers responded positively to the weekly adventures of the little Breton girl who journeyed to Paris to find work and became a comic book hero for doing so. The series, according to Yves Frémion, made Rivière "the first screenwriter of French comics."

However, as mentioned by Chris Reyns-Chikuma, Bécassine was “quickly taken over by [the illustrator], Joseph Pinchon, joined by other male artists, who will long be the only ones credited for the creation and reproduction of the character.”

=== Advice columnist ===
In addition to the comic section, Rivière started a popular advice column that ran weekly in the same newspaper (La Semaine de Suzette); she signed it Tante Jacqueline ("Aunt Jacqueline"). There, Rivière answered questions sent from readers and her advice often encouraged the female readers to be polite and obedient, which was standard advice given at the time to young ladies. The Tante Jacqueline column proved to be extremely popular and was continued by numerous editors for many decades after Rivière passed on authorship to others. (The newspaper La Semaine de Suzette was printed by the same publisher from 2 February 1905 until 6 June 1940 and again from 30 May 1946 to 25 August 1960.)

=== Novelist ===
The author wrote 15 novels under the pen names Bernard La Roche or Bernard de Laroche that were published from 1878 to 1900. After she divorced her husband in 1899, she assumed the pseudonym Jacqueline Rivière for her later novels published from 1902 to 1920. It is said that the prolific writer worked until her sudden death.

In the years since her death, many publishers reprinting her early novels, have taken the opportunity to change the pseudonym used by the author on the original title page (Bernard La Roche, Mrs. Bernard de Laroche, Bernard de Laroche or Mrs. Alexandre Bernhardt) to Jacqueline Rivière.

== Death ==
On 20 February 1920, Jacqueline Rivière died in Paris, in the 8th arrondissement, at 68. An extensive obituary appeared in La Semaine de Suzette calling her by the name "Mme. B. De Laroche."

The French Postal Service commemorated the creation of the Breton maid Bécassine by issuing a stamp with the character’s likeness in April 2005, the centenary of the publication of the first adventure of the character created by Rivière. The postal service published over 27 million copies.

== Selected works ==
Many of the author's titles can be found at Worldcat. Her books carry a variety of pseudonyms from several publishers. (Note: Her first publisher in Paris, Henri Gautier, merged with another company in 1917 to become Gautier and Languereau. That company was later acquired by Hachette.)

- Paris héroïque (Heroic Paris), by Bernard de Laroche. Limoges: M. Barbou, 1886
- Les Femmes malheureuses (Unhappy Women) by Raoul de Navery (pen name of Mme E. Chervet) and Bernard de Laroche. Paris: H. Gautier, 1889
- Béatrice (Beatrice), by Bernard de Laroche. Limoges: M. Barbou, 1900
- La filleule des abeilles (The Goddaughter of Bees), by Jacqueline Rivière, 1900. (Ninth edition Paris: Gautier and Languereau, 1950)
- L'Erreur (The Mistake), by Jacqueline Rivière. Paris: H. Gautier, 1905
- La Maison des yeux bleus (The House of Blue Eyes), by Jacqueline Rivière. Paris: H. Gautier, 1908
- Le Jouet (The Toy), by Jacqueline Rivière. Paris: H. Gautier, 1913
- Le Bois-Chantant (The Singing Wood), new edition. by Jacqueline Rivière pseud. of Bernard de Laroche Paris: Gautier and Languereau, 1920
- Le Hameau du trésor-perdu (The Hamlet of the Lost Treasure), by Jacqueline Rivière. Paris: H. Gautier, 1920
- Bonne Maman (Good Mom), by Jacqueline Rivière. Paris: Gautier and Languereau, 1926
- Le Piège (The Trap), by Jacqueline Rivière, 1926
