= Joseph Pinchon =

French painter

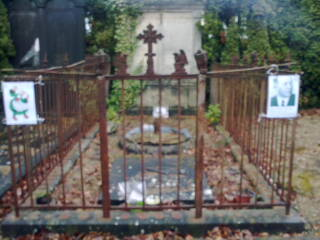
Tomb of Joseph Pinchon at the Cimetière Saint-Acheul in Amiens

Émile-Joseph Porphyre Pinchon (17 April 1871, Amiens – 20 June 1953, Paris) was a French painter, illustrator, designer and comic book creator, best known for his series Bécassine.

== Biography ==
Joseph Pinchon, born in Amiens in 1871, first studied painting with Fernand Cormon. His brother Emile Pinchon (1872–1933) was a sculptor. Joseph worked mainly as an animalier, painting hunting scenes. He was vice-president of the painting section of the Société Nationale des Beaux-Arts, which he had joined in 1899; they awarded him their Grand prix in 1928, and in 1948 their Puvis de Chavannes prize.

As an illustrator he contributed to many books, including an 1899 edition of L'Arbre by Georges Rodenbach, and a 1947 edition of La Grande Meute by Paul Vialar. From 1926 to 1929, he also provided satirical illustrations to L'Écho de Paris.

From 1908 until 1914 he worked as the costume designer for the Opéra Garnier, the main location of the Paris Opera.

In 1916 he joined the army as an infantryman.

After the first world war, he also directed two movies, Mektoub, set in Marocco in 1919, and Mon Village in 1920.

But his main body of work are his comics and illustrations made for many French youth magazines. This started in 1903 in Saint-Nicolas, where he illustrated L'Automobile enchantée, written by Henry Gauthier-Villars. His biggest success came in 1905, when he illustrated the first story about Bécassine, created by Jacqueline Rivière, about a young Breton girl, in the form of text comics (comic strips with the text beneath the drawings instead of in balloons). From 1913 on, the adventures of Bécassine were collected in 24 albums. Bécassine is considered to be the first female comic heroine.

== Bibliography ==
- 1905-1950: Bécassine, written by Maurice Languereau and later Madeleine Harfaux, first published in La Semaine de Suzette and then collected in 24 albums, plus two derivative books in 1921 and 1927.
- 1920-1939: Frimousset, written by Jean Nohain, appeared in L'Écho de Paris, 10 albums
- 1928-1934: Grassouillet, written by Jean Nohain, 6 albums
- 1929-1944: La Famille Amulette, appeared in Benjamin, 2 albums
- 1945-1949: 12 comic books for publisher Gordinne, from Liège, Belgium, including:
  - Olive et Bengali, 3 albums
  - Suzel, 2 albums
  - Gringalou, 3 albums
