= China doll =

Glazed porcelain doll

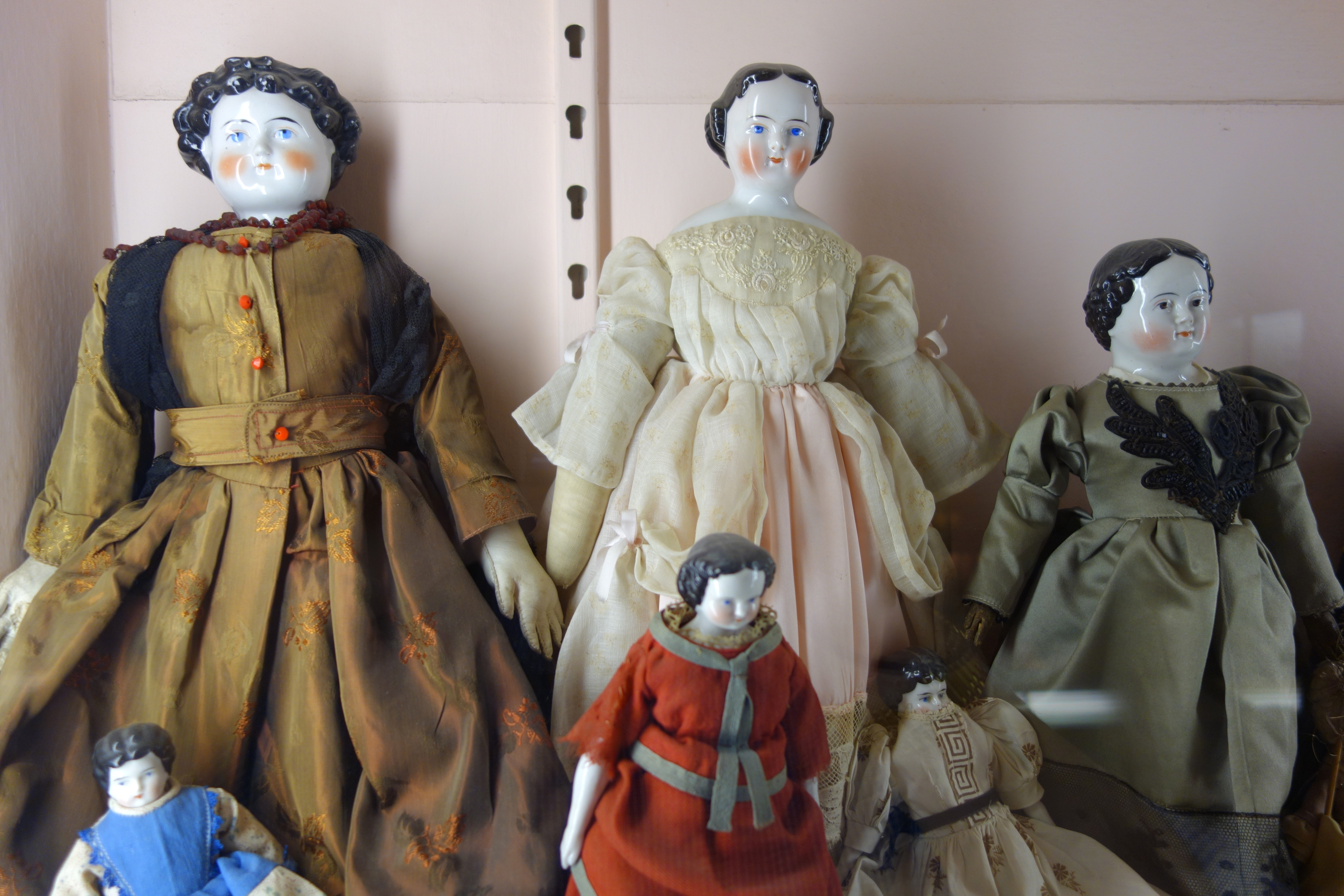
China dolls, 1850-1870 - Fairbanks Museum and Planetarium

A china doll is a doll made partially or wholly out of glazed porcelain. The name comes from china being used to refer to the material porcelain. Colloquially the term china doll is sometimes used to refer to any porcelain or bisque doll, but more specifically it describes only glazed dolls.

A typical china doll has a glazed porcelain head with painted molded hair and a body made of cloth or leather. They range in size from more than 30" (76 cm) tall to 1 inch (2.5 cm). Antique china dolls were predominantly produced in Germany, with the peak of popularity between approximately 1850 and 1890. Rare and elaborately decorated antique china dolls can have value on the collectors market. Beginning in the mid-20th-century reproductions of china dolls of various quality were produced in Japan and the United States.

== History ==
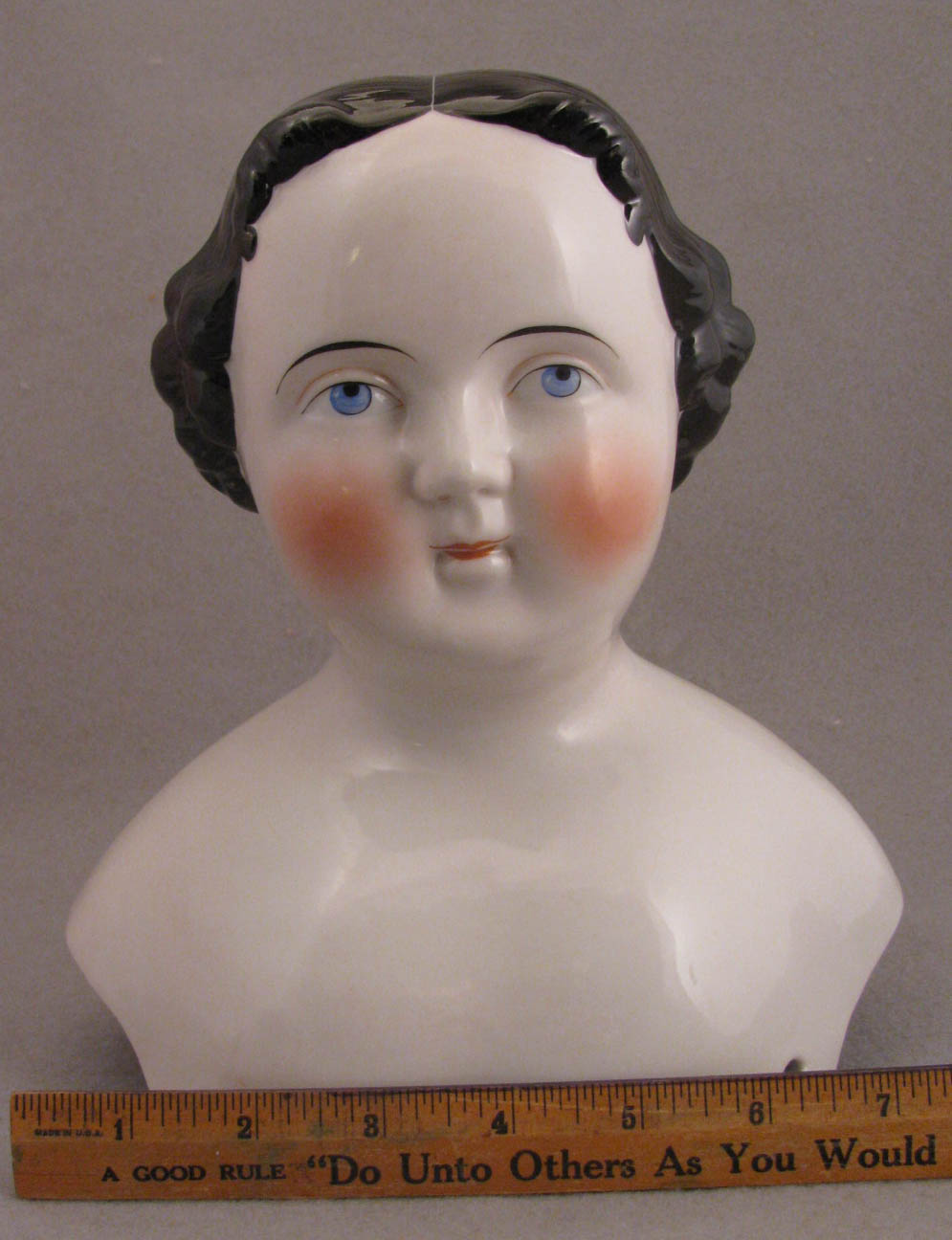
Typical German 1860s flat top hair style china doll

Antique china dolls were predominantly produced in Germany, from around 1840 into the 1930s with the peak in popularity between roughly 1850 and 1890. The earliest china dolls depicted grown women and were dressed in contemporary, fashionable clothes. These dolls display contemporary hairstyles: sausage curls, ribbons or headbands. From approximately the 1850s on, child-like china dolls became popular. Blonde-haired china dolls became more prevalent at the end of the 1800s.

China doll heads were produced in large quantities, counting in the millions. Some of the most prolific manufacturers were companies like Kestner; Conta & Boehme; Alt, Beck and Gottschalck; and Hertwig. Other German companies include Kling, Kister, KPM, and Meissen. China dolls were also produced in Czechoslovakia (Schlaggenwald), Denmark (Royal Copenhagen), France (Barrois, Jacob Petit), Poland (Tielsch), and Sweden (Rörstrand.) The earliest known were made by Kestner, KPM, Meissen and Royal Copenhagen.

Production of unglazed bisque dolls began in 1850 and they increased their market share towards the end of the 19th century. Harper's Bazaar referred to china dolls as "old fashioned" in 1873, though they continued being made well into the early 20th century.

== Characteristics ==
Rare c.1840s KPM china doll

A typical china doll has a head made of glazed white porcelain, with painted molded hair and facial features. The glaze gives the doll a characteristic glossy appearance. The head is typically attached to a body made of cloth or leather, sometimes with arms and legs made of porcelain. Some early china head dolls were placed on peg jointed wooden bodies. China doll parts were also sold for the customer to fashion a body and clothing. Some cloth bodied china dolls could be more than 30" (76 cm) tall, and others as small as 3" (7.5 cm). Some china dolls, like the Frozen Charlotte dolls, were made entirely out of porcelain, with head and body made in one piece without any articulation. The Frozen Charlotte dolls range in size from 2.5 cm (1 inch) in height up to 46 cm (18 inches).

Rare and elaborately decorated antique china dolls can have value on the collectors market. Most china dolls are unmarked or marked with only a size number. Alt, Beck and Gottschalck dolls will sometimes have a size and model number. Rorstrand dolls usually are marked with a model letter and size number on the bottom front of the shoulder plate. KPM, Meissen, and Royal Copenhagen products will bear company markings.

Parian dolls are similar to china dolls in that their heads are made of white untinted porcelain, but they are unglazed with a matte finish and typically have blonde hair. They are found on similar body types. They were also mainly made in Germany, from around the 1860s to 1890s.

== Reproductions ==
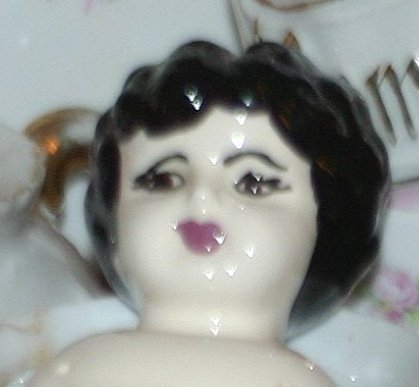
Reproduction china doll head with characteristic poorly painted appearance

There was a resurgence in the popularity of china dolls in the mid-1900s when many were reproduced in the United States by companies such as Ruth Gibbs of New Jersey and Californians Emma Clear and Mark Farmer, among many others. From the 1930s Emma Clear became renowned for her high quality, finely made reproduction china heads. She also produced some all-original, non-reproduction dolls, including portraits of George and Martha Washington made in the same manner as antique dolls.

Some hobbyists purchased or made molds from original antique china dolls and created reproductions in low fired ceramic. These homemade versions are typically of poor paint quality and may exhibit crazing in the glaze due to poor firing technique. Another tip off that such a doll is a reproduction is if it is signed with an individual's name and/or date. The antique dolls were not typically signed in this manner.

Mid-20th century labeled Japanese reproduction doll heads, made in both glazed porcelain and Parian, and in both blonde and black hair.

There were several models of china dolls made in Japan and marketed in the 20th century too. These doll heads were often labeled only with easily lost stickers inside the heads. They are frequently mistaken for their antique German predecessors. Trading companies in The United States, such as Shackman, Brinn and A A Importing company, distributed these dolls, frequently in kit form. The Standard Doll Co. of Long Island, New York also advertised china dolls in the 1970s.
