= Bécassine =

French comic strip

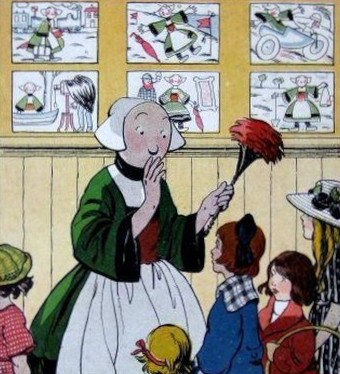
- Bécassine on the cover of Les Cent Métiers de Bécassine
- Publisher: Gautier-Languereau

Creative team
- Writers: Jacqueline Rivière
- Artists: Joseph Pinchon
- Editors

Original publication
- Published in: La Semaine de Suzette
- Date of publication: 1905–1962

Bécassine is a French comic strip and the name of its heroine, appearing for the first time in the first issue of La Semaine de Suzette on February 2, 1905. She is considered one of the first female protagonists in French comic history.

Bécassine has had a long history of publication and syndication and has been described as an enduring figure in French comics. Since 1 January 2024, the series has been in the public domain.

== Character ==
The character Bécassine is a young Breton housemaid, usually depicted wearing a green dress pastiching traditional Breton peasant costume, with lace coiffe and clogs. She is said to come from Finistère, the area most associated with traditional Breton culture. However, her clothing has non-Breton elements, reminiscent of the local costume of Picardy. She is usually portrayed without a mouth.

Seen as a stereotype and remnant of the contempt with which the Bretons were long seen, she is the typical provincial girl as seen by the more refined city people of Paris, the target audience of the young girls' magazine La Semaine de Suzette. But over the course of the stories, and coupled with the success she has, she is depicted more and more favourably. "Bécassine" is a nickname, derived from the French word for a number of birds of the family of the snipe, which is also used as a way of saying "fool" in French.

== History ==
Initially made as filler for a blank page, the story, written by Jacqueline Rivière and drawn by Joseph Pinchon, was such a success that new pages regularly appeared, still in the guise of page fillers.

Only in 1913 did Bécassine become the heroine of more structured stories. Still drawn by Pinchon, the stories were then written by Caumery (pseudonym of Maurice Languereau), one of the associates of Gautier-Languereau, the publisher of La Semaine de Suzette. At that time, the character's real name was revealed to be Annaïck Labornez, her nickname coming from her home village, called Clocher-les-Bécasses.

Between 1913 and 1950, 27 volumes of the adventures of Bécassine appeared. Pinchon drew 25 of them, and Edouard Zier the other two. All 27 were credited as being written by "Caumery", but after Languereau's death in 1941, the pseudonym was used by others.

After Pinchon's death in 1953, the series continued with other artists, most notably Jean Trubert beginning in 1959.

With a first appearance three years before Les Pieds Nickelés, Bécassine is considered the birth of the modern bande dessinée, the Franco-Belgian comic. It marks the transition between the illustrated histories, or text comics, and the true bande dessinée. Its style of drawing, with lively, modern, rounded lines, would inspire the ligne claire style which Hergé 25 years later would popularise in The Adventures of Tintin.

After a decline in popularity, Bécassine regained prominence due to the hit single "Bécassine, c'est ma cousine" ("Bécassine, she's my cousin") by Chantal Goya, which sold over three million copies in 1979. It has been replied to by the Breton guitarist Dan Ar Braz with the song "Bécassine, ce n'est pas ma cousine" ("Bécassine, she's not my cousin").

The popular television show Le Bébête Show, a series that is similar to Spitting Image, showed far right politician Jean-Marie Le Pen in the guise of the puppet Pencassine.

In April 2005, the French Post issued a stamp depicting Bécassine for her centenary. In contemporary Brittany she remains a familiar figure, with Bécassine dolls and ornaments available in tourist shops.

== Bibliography ==
Source: Béra, Michel; Denni, Michel; and Mellot, Philippe (2002): "Trésors de la Bande Dessinée 2003-2004". Paris, Les éditions de l'amateur. ISBN 2-85917-357-9

If not otherwise mentioned, Pinchon is the artist, Caumery the writer, and Gautier-Languereau the publisher.

Volume	Year	Title	Remarks
1	1913	L'enfance de Bécassine	Published by Gautier
2	1916	Bécassine pendant la guerre	Published by Gautier
3	1917	Bécassine chez les Alliés	Drawn by E. Zier, published by Gautier
4	1918	Bécassine mobilisée	Drawn by E. Zier
5	1919	Bécassine en apprentissage	
6	1919	Bécassine chez les Turcs	
7	1920	Les Cent Métiers de Bécassine	
8	1921	Bécassine voyage	
9	1922	Bécassine nourrice	
10	1923	Bécassine alpiniste	
11	1924	Les Bonnes Idées de Bécassine	
12	1925	Bécassine au pays basque	
13	1926	Bécassine, son oncle et leurs amis	
14	1927	L'Automobile de Bécassine	
15	1929	Bécassine au pensionnat	
16	1930	Bécassine en aeroplane	
17	1931	Bécassine fait du scoutisme	
18	1932	Bécassine aux bains de mer	
19	1933	Bécassine dans la neige	
20	1934	Bécassine prend des pensionnaires	
21	1935	Bécassine a Clocher-les-Bécasses	
22	1936	Bécassine en croisière	
23	1937	Bécassine cherche un emploi	
24	1938	Les Mésaventures de Bécassine	
25	1939	Bécassine en roulotte	
26	1992	Bécassine au studio	Only published then because the outbreak of the Second World War
	1921	Alphabet de Bécassine	Also published as Bécassine maîtresse d'école: published out of the main series
	1927	Les Chansons de Bécassine	Published outside the main series
1	1959	Bécassine revient	New series, drawn by Trubert, written by Camille François
2	1961	L'Alphabet de Bécassine	Drawn by Trubert, written by Vaubant
3	1962	Bécassine mène l'enquête	Drawn by Trubert, written by Vaubant

== Film versions ==
Bécassine was made into a film in 1940, directed by Pierre Caron with a story by Jean Nohain and René Pujol, and starring Paulette Dubost as Bécassine.

An animated film, Bécassine, le trésor viking (Becassine and the Viking Treasure), was made in 2001.

Another film adaptation, Bécassine, was released in France in 2018, and Bulgaria in 2019.
