= Mariquita Pérez =

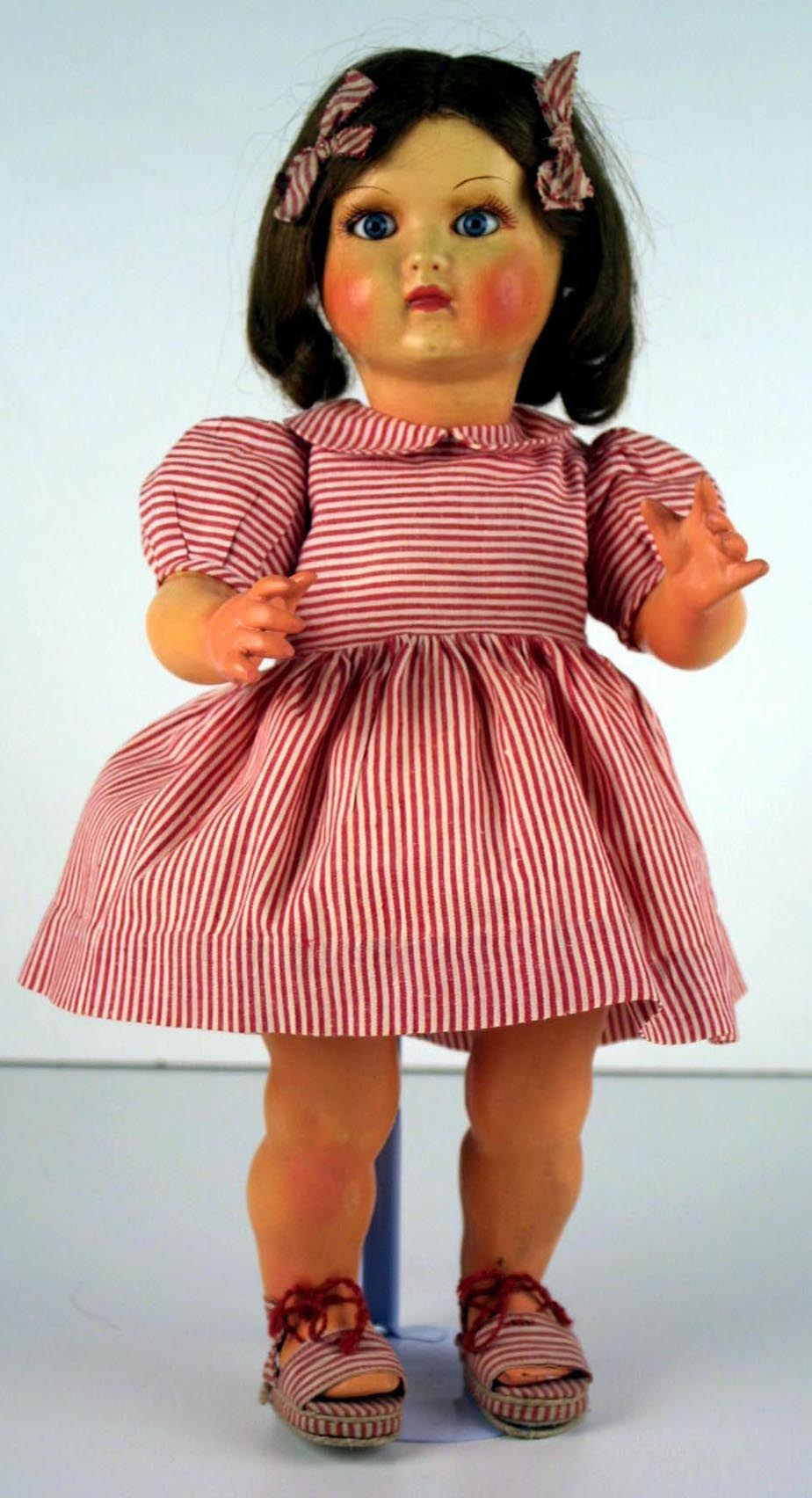
- An early model of Mariquita Pérez
- Type: Doll
- Country: Spain
- Availability: c. 1940–1976
- Materials: Composition
- Features: Ball-jointed body

Mariquita Pérez was a Spanish composition doll created in the late 1930s and produced until 1976, considered the most famous doll in the country's history. It was created by the high society woman Leonor Coello de Portugal, who was inspired by other dolls such as the French Bleuette and the Argentine Marilú. Mariquita Pérez was an immediate success and became the most coveted doll of 1940s and 1950s Spain, although its high cost made it a toy reserved for girls from the wealthier families. The doll is regarded as emblematic of post-war Spanish society and representative of the era's upper classes. Nevertheless, Mariquita Pérez had great popularity across all social classes, as her image was spread through songs, radio programmes and elaborate shop windows. Today, the doll is a prized object for collectors and for women who were unable to acquire it during their childhood.

== History ==
Despite its popularity, the origin of Mariquita Pérez is unknown, although there are different versions to explain it. According to writers Salud Amores and Alicia Amigó, evidence suggests that the doll was first produced in the workshops of the manufacturer Florido in Madrid. There is also a widespread version that places its origin in the town of Onil. Interviewed by RTVE, Amores and Amigó pointed out that the doll was launched on the market in the autumn of 1940, so the conception of the product must have taken place between 1939 and 1940, following the end of the Spanish Civil War. Other writers suggest that it was created in 1938. Mariquita Pérez was created by the high society woman Leonor Coello de Portugal, who was inspired by other dolls that were popular in Europe and the Americas, like the French Bleuette and the Argentine Marilú.
