= Société Française de Fabrication de Bébés et Jouets =

French doll-making consortium

The Société Française de Fabrication de Bébés et Jouets ("French Company for Manufacturing Dolls and Toys", often referred to by its initials, S.F.B.J.) was a large doll making consortium founded in France by the union of a number of major French doll companies including Jumeau and Bru and the Franco-German doll company Fleischmann & Bloedel in 1899. The company went out of business in the late 1950s.

The S.F.B.J. made dolls in France and also assembled dolls with both French and German sourced parts. Its dolls were made of many materials including bisque, composition and early plastics – in the later years of the firm. The S.F.B.J.-made dolls from fine to cheap qualities and also had a large, well-equipped dressmaking branch. There were many different moulds, including character dolls modeled after real children and dolls designed by French artists. S.F.B.J. dolls were used for tourist souvenirs as well as children's toys. The popular Bleuette dolls were one of its most high profiled products.
