= Eugène Mouton =

French writer

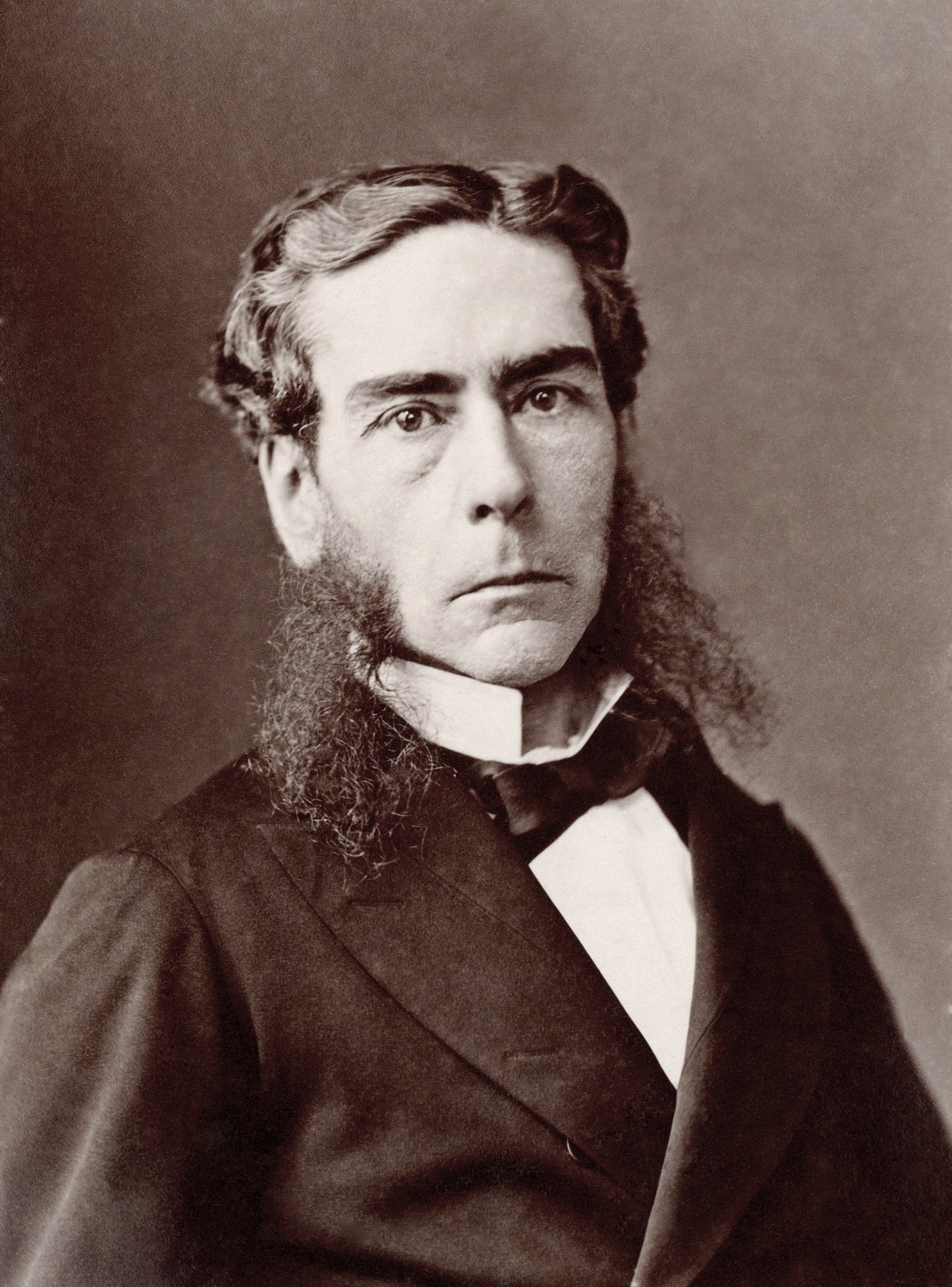
Eugène Mouton, circa 1880 (photograph by Nadar.

Pierre Martin Désiré Eugène Mouton (12 April 1823, in Marseille – 8 June 1902, in Paris) was a French writer of comic, adventure, and fantastical literature, and is considered an early writer of science fiction. He wrote under the name Mérinos. The son of a military officer father and a Creole mother, he lived in Guadeloupe until the age of ten. In 1848 he became a magistrate; his career progressed upward for the next 20 years, and he rose to the rank of prosecutor. During his time in Rodez he helped to implement one of the first mobile libraries in France.

He wrote for various newspapers, and his first story was published in 1857 when L'Invalide à la tête de bois (The Invalid with the Wooden Head) appeared in Le Figaro under the pen name of Mérinos. His subsequent success caused him to resign from the magistracy in 1868 in order to devote himself to writing. His principal works are Les lois pénales en France (1868), Nouvelles et fantaisies humoristisques (1873 and 1876), Voyages et aventures du Marius Cougourdan (1879), and Histoire de l'invalide à la tête de bois (1887).

== Works ==
- "L'Invalide à la tête de bois" (1857)
- "La fin du monde" (1872)
- "L'origine de la vie" (1877)
- "L'historioscope" (1882)
- "Le Kraken" (1884)
