= Gautier-Languereau =

French publishing house

- Parent company: Hachette Livre
- Status: Active
- Founded: 1859
- Founder: Maurice Languereau and Henri Gautier
- Country of origin: France
- Publication types: children's books and magazines
- Official website: www.gautier-languereau.fr/index.php

Gautier-Languereau is a French publishing house, founded by Maurice Languereau and Henri Gautier, and currently owned by Hachette Livre, and used as an imprint for children's literature.

== History ==
Founded in 1859 as Gautier, the company was renamed Gautier-Languereau in 1917 when Maurice Languereau became full partner with his uncle Henri Gautier. They specialized in children's books and magazines and religious literature. Their biggest success came with the weekly magazine for girls La Semaine de Suzette, published from 1905, and its flagship comic, Bécassine. The first Bécassine books appeared in 1913. From that year on, the stories were written by Languereau.

The company was acquired by Hachette in 1991.

== Book series ==
- Les albums de Bécassine
- Albums merveilleux (1961-1965)
- Au Fil de la vie
- Les Bêtes chez elles
- Bibliothèque bleue
- Bibliothèque de ma fille
- Bibliothèque des petites sources de richesse
- Bibliothèque de Suzette (1919-1958) - novels for girls
- Collection Delly
- Collection Fontanille
- Collection Jean-François (1950-1960) - novels for boys
- Des ouvrages de vie pratique
- Familia
- Les Histoires de Bécassine
- Histoires de tableaux
- Je lis tout seul
- Jeunes bibliophiles
- Livres à lire, livres à jouer
- Les Mémoires de Bécassine
- Les nouveaux bibliophiles
- Nouvelle bibliothèque de Suzette
- Les petits Gautier
- Pitchoun
- Premiers Albums (1980-1992)
- Premiers Livres (1972-1985)
- Les quatres saisons
- Romans à lire
- Scènes et tableaux
- Les Secrets du pirate
- Série 15
- Sur les pas de...
- L'Univers en couleurs
