= Parian doll =

19th-century German type of doll

German Alt Beck & Gottschalck bisque doll with glass eyes

"Parian" is a term misapplied to a type of bisque shoulder head dolls manufactured primarily in Germany in the last quarter of the 19th century, from around 1860 to 1880. The origin of the term "parian" comes from the white marble from the island of Paros. The proper descriptive term for these dolls is "bisque". These shoulder head dolls have a body made from fabrics and a head created from very lightly tinted or untinted white porcelain. Unlike the china doll however, the bisque doll's head is not dipped in glaze before firing and as such has a matte finish, giving it a markedly different appearance. The UFDC (United Federation of Doll Clubs) still perpetuates the incorrect definition of these dolls is as follows: "Parian doll: doll made of fine white bisque (unglazed porcelain) without tinting. The features, hair and cheeks may be painted." Many collectors now are discarding the term parian in favor of untinted bisque versus tinted bisque.

Bisque dolls usually have molded blond hair. Brown and black haired versions are less common. These dolls are often elaborately decorated with colored feathers, flowers, scarves, ribbons, combs, jewels, and luster ruffs (single, double, occasionally triple) about the bottom of the yoke. The hair was arranged in interesting and elaborate ways. The eyes were painted or glass. The glass-eyed dolls are sought after by collectors.

Companies manufacturing these untinted bisque dolls include Alt Beck & Gottschalck, C.F.Kling, and Simon & Halbig, among others. Other manufacturers include Conta & Boehme, Dornheim Koch & Fischer, Kister, Hertel Schwab & Co., C. F. Kling & Co., Simon & Halbig, Bahr & Proschild, and Hertwig among many others.
