= La Semaine de Suzette =

French magazine for girls

- Categories: Girl's magazine
- Frequency: Weekly
- Publisher: Gautier & Languereau
- Founder: Henri Gautier
- First issue: 2 February 1905
- Final issue: 25 August 1960
- Country: France
- Language: French

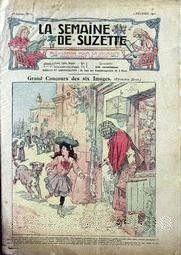
La Semaine de Suzette, magazine in 1905

La Semaine de Suzette was a French magazine aimed at girls, which appeared from 1905 until 1960. It contained early comics like Bécassine.

== History ==
La Semaine de Suzette (Suzette's Week) started in 1905 as a magazine aimed at conservative, Catholic French girls, published by Gautier & Languereau. The founder was Henri Gautier. It contained stories and comics, but also patterns for doll clothes, e.g. for the magazine's mascot Bleuette. Readers were mainly Catholic middle-class girls aged between 8 and 18.

La Semaine de Suzette was published weekly on Thursdays. The first issue appeared on 2 February 1905, and the last on 25 August 1960, with a break during World War II from 6 June 1940 until 30 May 1946.

Many of the text stories which appeared in La Semaine de Suzette were later republished in the Bibliothèque de Suzette (Suzette's Library), which existed between 1919 and 1965.
