= Jumeau =

French bisque doll company

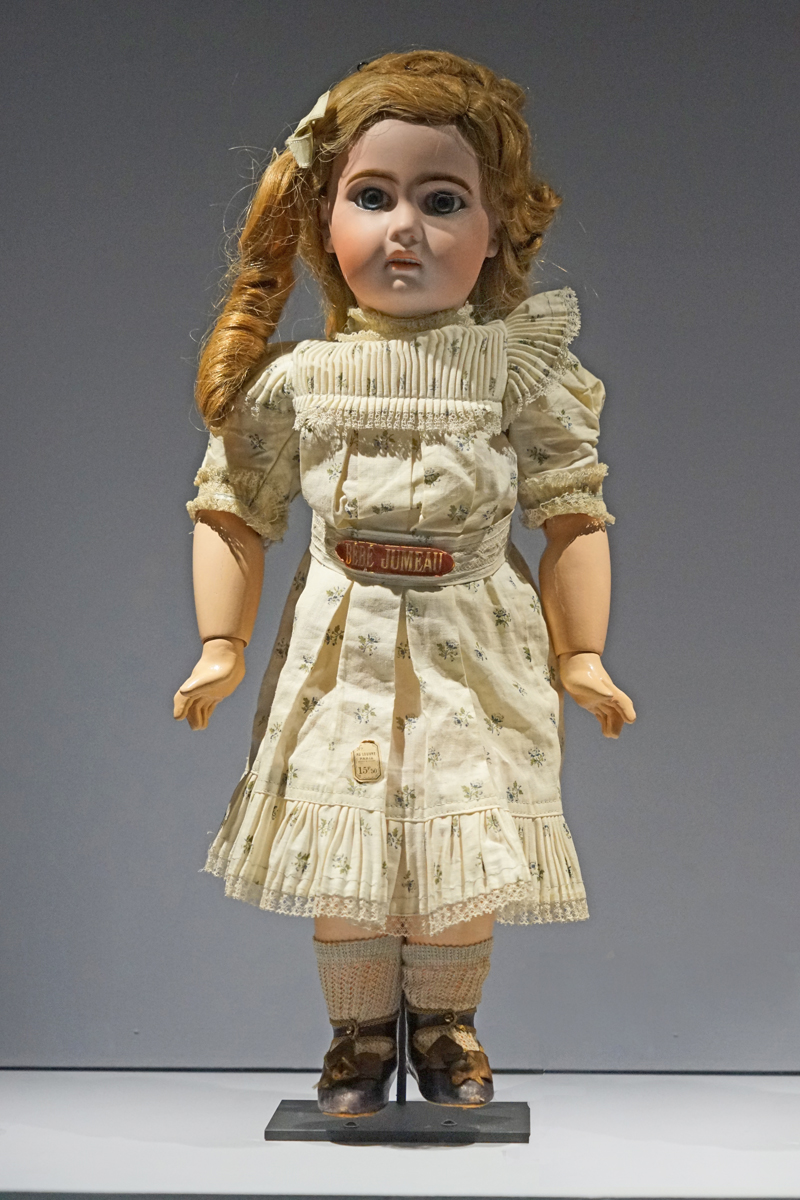
Jumeau doll

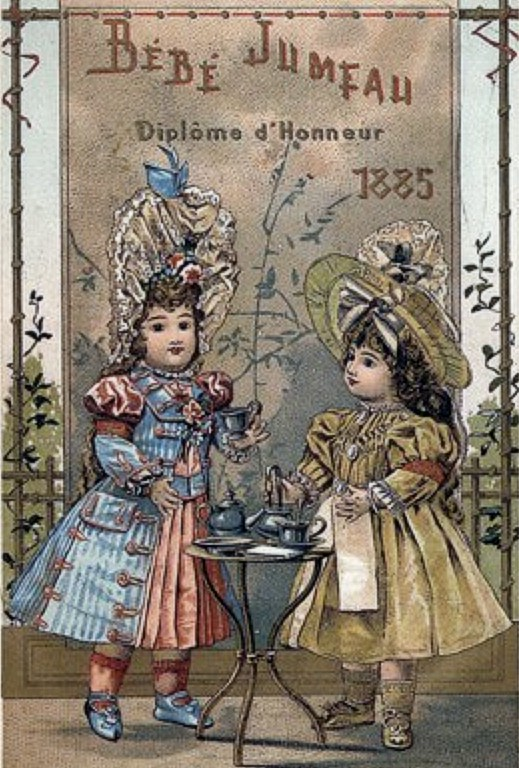
Jumeau advertising from 1885

Jumeau was a French company, founded in the early 1840s, which designed and manufactured high quality bisque dolls.

It was founded by Louis-Desire Belton and Pierre-François Jumeau in the Maison Jumeau of Montreuil-sous-Bois, near Paris, France. While Belton did not remain with the company for long, under Jumeau's leadership (and later, under the leadership of his son, Emile), the company soon gained a reputation for dolls with beautiful faces and "exquisite" clothing which replicated the popular fashions of the time. The dolls are still popular with collectors today, and have sold for over £2,000 at auction.

== History ==
The Jumeau company first emerged as a partnership between Louis-Desire Belton and Pierre-François Jumeau in Paris in the early 1840s. In 1844, Belton and Jumeau presented their dolls at the Paris Exposition (at which they received an honorable mention), but, by 1846, Belton's name was no longer associated with the dolls, and Jumeau was trading in his own right. A bronze medal in the 1849 Paris Exposition followed, as did an appearance at the Great Exhibition in London in 1851, at which the company was awarded a First Place Medal. Through much of this period, the firm sold only their own dolls to wholesalers, although during the 1850s and 1860s, the company moved into selling wax dolls imported from Britain.

At the Paris expositions and the Great Exhibition in London, Jumeau dolls received their commendations due largely to the quality of the clothing, and no special significance was attached to the dolls themselves. This changed in 1867, when at the Exposition Universelle of that year, the company was awarded a silver medal, and "special mention was made of the doll's heads". 1867 was also the year that Pierre-François' son, Emile Jumeau, joined the company. By 1873, when they were awarded a gold medal at the Vienna Exposition, the company was producing their own bisque dolls in their factory in Montreuil.

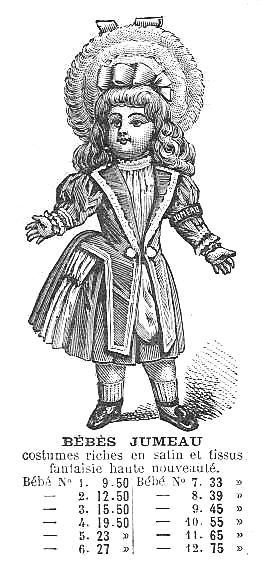
Catalogue engraving of a Jumeau doll from ca 1880

By 1877 Emile Jumeau had produced the first Bébés (i.e. dolls in the image of a little girl). With realistic glass eyes and "stylish fashions" produced by costumiers, thousands of Bébé dolls were produced for an international market.

In 1878, the Jumeau company won a gold medal at the Exposition Universelle (1878). The award was proudly advertised on the bodies, boxes, shoes and even the dress labels of the dolls. Jumeau won a number of other high awards including the prizes for the best dollmaker at both the Sydney International Exhibition (1879) and Melbourne International Exhibition (1880) in Australia. The dolls were internationally sought after as luxury items and status symbols. The firm also was regarded as an industrial success, with production figures of over three million dolls annually by the mid-1890s.

The "Golden Age" of the Jumeau factory lasted for two decades, from the late 1870s to the late 1890s, when the competition from German dolls sent the firm into financial difficulties. The Jumeau company became part of the French conglomerate the Société Française de Fabrication de Bébés et Jouets. The S.F.B.J. still continued to use the Bébé Jumeau trademark throughout the 20th century, even producing dolls in the manner of Jumeau.
