= Bisque doll =

Doll made of bisque or biscuit porcelain

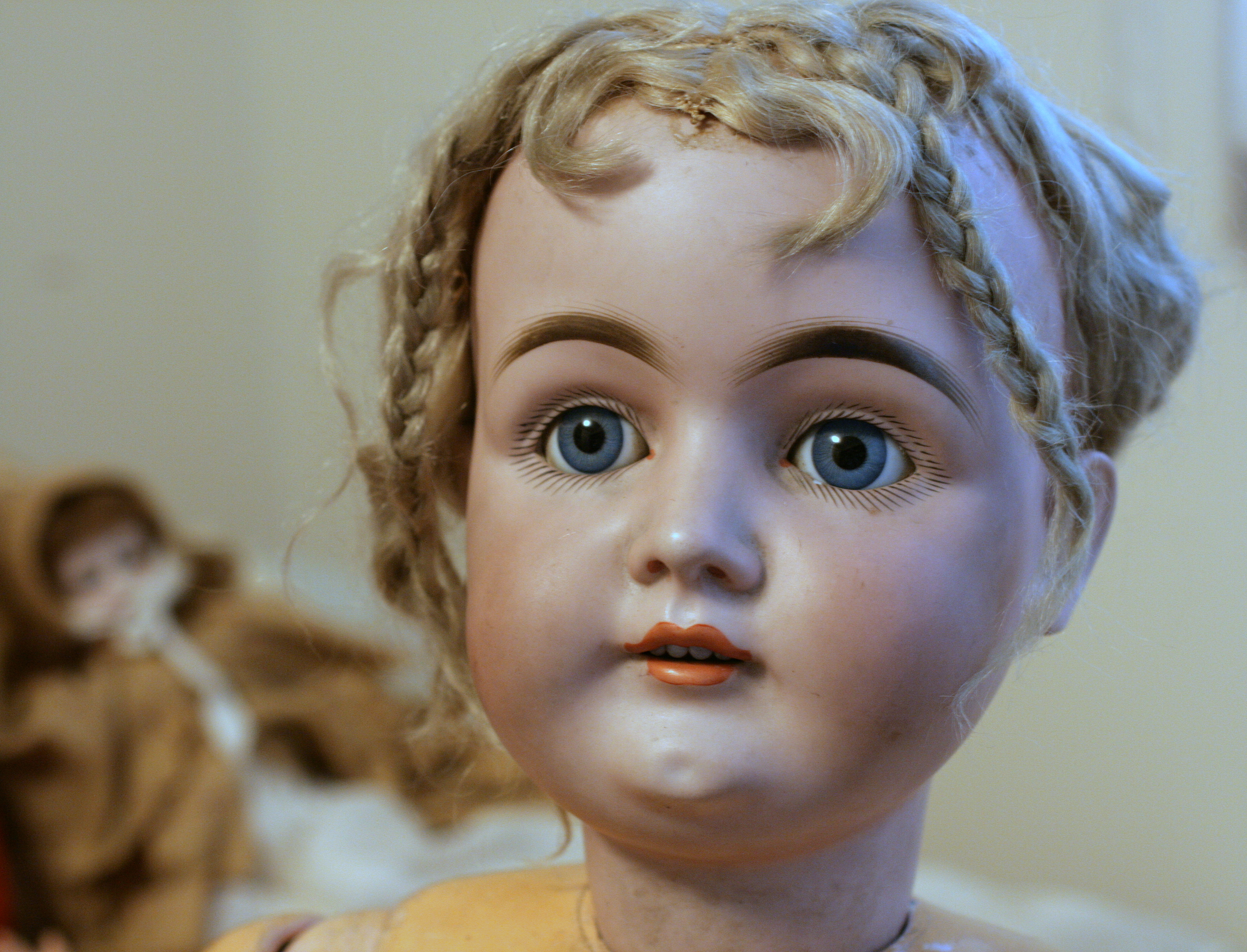
A German bisque doll from around 1900

A bisque doll or porcelain doll is a doll made partially or wholly out of bisque or biscuit porcelain. Bisque dolls are characterized by their realistic, skin-like matte finish. They had their peak of popularity between 1860 and 1900 with French and German dolls. Bisque dolls are collectible, and antique dolls can be worth thousands of dollars. Antique German and French bisque dolls from the 19th century were often made as children's playthings, but contemporary bisque dolls are predominantly made directly for the collectors market.

Colloquially, the terms porcelain doll, bisque doll and china doll are sometimes used interchangeably, but collectors, when referring to antique dolls, make a distinction between china dolls, made of glazed porcelain, and bisque dolls, made of unglazed porcelain. When referring to contemporary dolls, the terms porcelain and bisque are sometimes used interchangeably.

== Bisque dolls ==
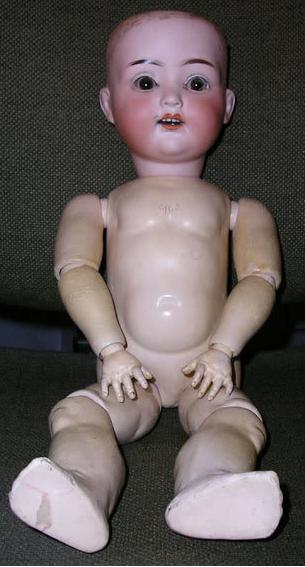
Bisque-head German doll with glass eyes and ball-jointed composition body, c. 1920

Most bisque dolls have a head made of bisque porcelain and a body made of another material. Bisque is unglazed porcelain with a matte finish, giving it a realistic skin-like texture. It is usually tinted or painted a realistic skin color. The bisque head is attached to a body made of cloth or leather, or a jointed body made of wood, papier-mâché or composition, a mix of pulp, sawdust, glue and similar materials. Doll bodies are only rarely made entirely of bisque because of its fragility and weight. Dolls that are made entirely of bisque are called all-bisque dolls. Bisque dolls usually have eyes made of glass. They vary widely in size, from lifesize down to half an inch.

When producing a bisque doll, ceramic raw materials are shaped in a mold and fired at more than 1,260 °C (2,300 °F). The head is painted more than once to create skin tones and facial characteristics and then fired again after each layer. Antique German and French bisque dolls from the 19th century were often made as children's playthings, but contemporary bisque dolls are predominantly made directly for the collectors market.

== History ==
The earliest European porcelain dolls were china dolls, made predominantly in Germany between 1840 and 1880. China dolls were made of white glazed porcelain, giving them a characteristic glossy appearance, and their hair was painted on. Parian dolls were made in Germany of white unglazed porcelain from the 1850s onwards.

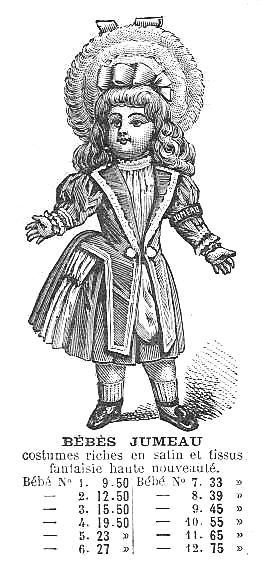
Catalogue engraving of a bisque doll from the French company Jumeau, c. 1880

French and German bisque dolls began taking over the market after 1860, and their production continued until after World War I. These dolls wore wigs, typically made from mohair or human hair. Between approximately 1860 and 1890 most bisque dolls were fashion dolls, made to represent grown-up women. They were intended for children of affluent families to play with and dress in contemporary fashions. These dolls came from French companies like Jumeau, Bru, Gaultier, Rohmer, Simone, and Huret. However, their heads were often manufactured in Germany. In the Passage Choiseul area of Paris, an industry grew around making clothing and accessories for the dolls.

Until the mid-19th century, most dolls were made to represent grown-ups, and when childlike dolls first appeared, it was a big shift. By the late 19th century, childlike dolls overtook the market. Foremost among these were the French Bébés from doll makers like Jumeau, Bru, Steiner, and Gaultier, which grew in popularity between the 1860s and 1880s. These were high-quality dolls made with great skill. Like the earlier fashion dolls, they were made for children and dressed in contemporary children's clothing. In the 1890s German doll makers began taking over the market with less expensive dolls. In response, the French doll makers began making dolls as a consortium under the name Société Française de Fabrication de Bébés et Jouets (S.F.B.J.) but these later French Bébés were often of lesser quality.

German childlike dolls were predominantly produced between 1890 and 1930. The earliest ones are often referred to as dolly-faced dolls and were made by companies like Armand Marseille, Simon & Halbig, Kämmer & Reinhardt, and Kestner. Many came from the Thuringen region, which has natural deposits of the clay used to make the dolls. In the early 20th century companies like Kämmer & Reinhardt, Heubach and Kestner began making more realistic and expressive childlike dolls, often called character-faced dolls.

Small lower-priced all-bisque dolls known as Frozen Charlotte or penny dolls were common from the late 19th century to the 1930s. They were unarticulated and made of a single piece of bisque. A few German manufacturers like Kestner also made more detailed dolls entirely of bisque with articulated necks, arms, or legs.

Bisque was the most common material for European doll heads until after the turn of the 20th century when composition (or composite) took over. In the early 20th century the bisque doll production began moving to the United States. American Kewpie dolls from the early 20th century were made of bisque, before celluloid became more common.

Bisque dolls were made as commercial products in Germany for the toy rather than collector market until the late 1930s. Japan also produced many small bisque dolls in the 1920s and 1930s, often cold painted with oil colours, which have subsequently washed off.

At about the same time, just before the Second World War, hobbyist production of reproduction dolls, firstly elaborately moulded female doll heads from the 1860s and 1870s, began in the US with doll artists such as Emma Clear. Reproduction bisque doll making grew slowly as a hobby in the United States in the 1950s and 1960s, expanding greatly during the 1970s and by about c. 1980 spreading to Europe, Great Britain, and Australia, via companies retailing moulds and supplies such as Seeley's and Wandke, which ran large scale networks of classes and seminars. Another branch of bisque doll-making that emerged during the 1940s in the US was "artists dolls", initially creatively designed and moulded dolls that were not copies of 19th century or early 20th century dolls or cast from earlier dolls. These dolls were intended for the adult collector market.

In the 1980s, bisque dolls had a revival with the growth of the collectors market, and towards the end of the 20th century, production began to move to China. China produced many inexpensive porcelain dolls sold in discount departments and chain stores, often decorator pieces. This production was at an industrial rather than hobby/studio scale. Mass-produced porcelain dolls can still be found worldwide in bargain stores retailing goods from China. More expensive, industrially produced bisque dolls may be found by mail order, gift shops, or even exclusive, upmarket toy shops as decorations for girls' rooms. Reproduction and artist made bisque dolls still appear, but the scale of the hobby is not as significant as in the 1980s.

== Collecting ==
Antique bisque dolls are collectible and valuable. Bisque dolls have sold for over US$200,000. But prices vary widely depending on the quality and condition of the doll. Preferable qualities of the bisque include a slight translucency without spots or holes. Dolls painted with more skill and detailed features are valued higher. Other qualities include closed mouths and expressions that are not "pretty," such as a character's face that is crying. More articulated bodies that can be posed more freely, such as jointed wood or composition bodies, are valued higher than stiffer papier-mâché or leather bodies.

French 1860-1890 fashion dolls are commonly worth over US$2000, and dolls from well-known doll makers like Jumeau, Bru, and Huret can be worth over US$20,000. Among the French Bébés early dolls from Jumeau and Bru generally go for several thousand dollars, while later S.F.B.J dolls may be worth only a few hundred. Among German dolls, the character-faced dolls are the most collectible, with rarer dolls fetching several thousand dollars. At the lower end of the price range are dolls that can be found for a few hundred dollars, like dolls from Armand Marseille and common types of dolls from Kestner. Unmarked dolls that can't be identified as coming from a specific manufacturer also fetch lower prices, but there are many exceptions. Small all-bisque penny dolls can be found at low prices as well. Carl Horn all bisque dolls are an exception, fetching upwards of $150 a piece for a 1" tall all-bisque doll.
