= Composition doll =

Doll made from a mixture of materials such as wood pulp, paper and other fillers

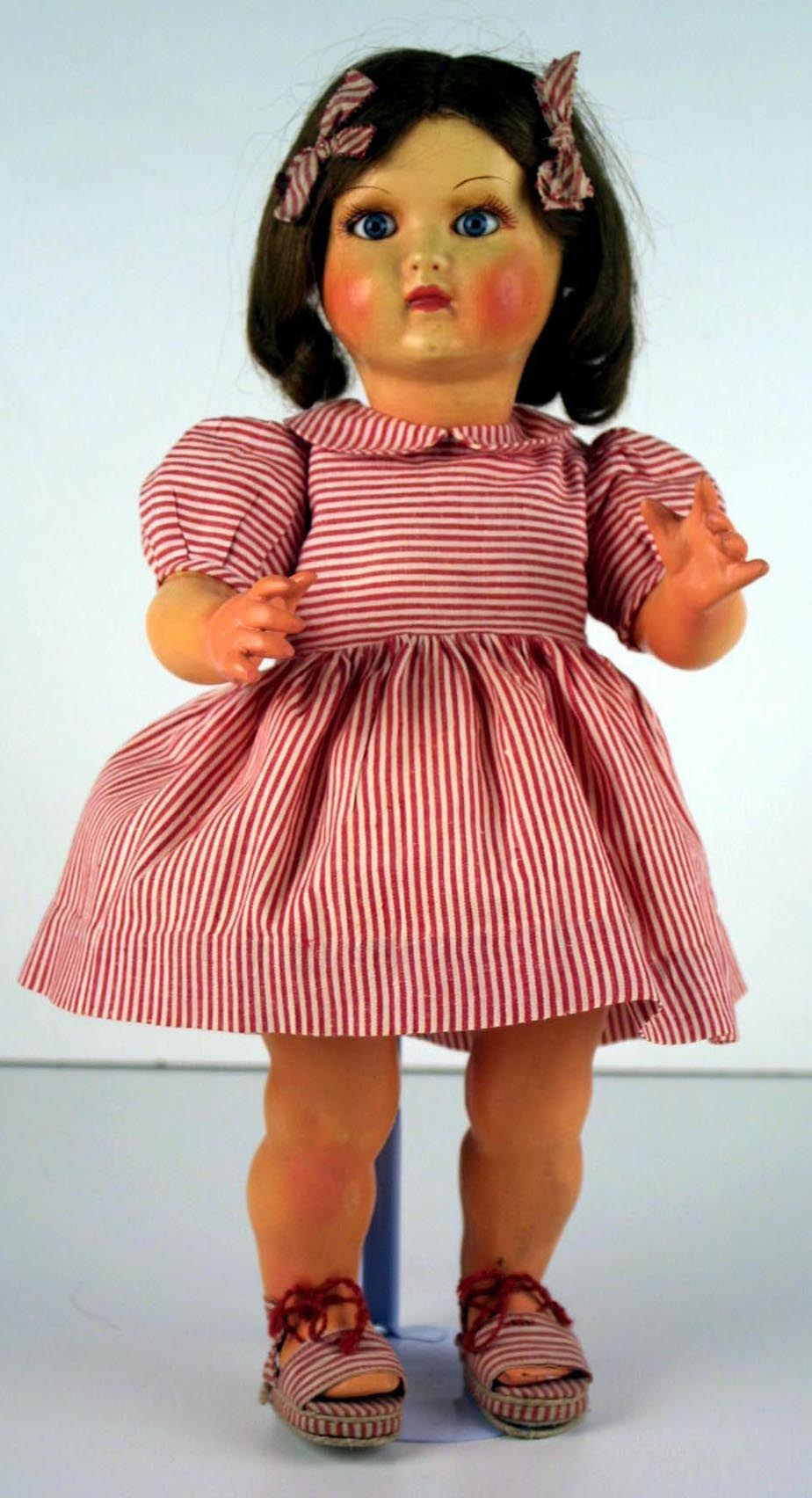
Created in the late 1930s, the Spanish composition doll Mariquita Pérez, is considered the most iconic doll of the country.

A composition doll is a doll made partially or wholly out of composition, a composite material composed of sawdust, glue, and other materials such as cornstarch, resin, and wood flour. The first composition dolls were made in the nineteenth century. Composite dolls were marketed as unbreakable, compared to earlier more fragile dolls. However, over time the composite material deteriorated, leaving many older dolls with small cracks and flaked surfaces. Some dolls were given a protective coating of varnish to delay deterioration. Notable composition dolls include Bleuette of France, Marilú of Argentina and Mariquita Pérez of Spain.

== Background ==
Many antique German and French bisque dolls from the nineteenth century combine a bisque head with a ball-jointed body made of composition.

In the United States composition dolls were hailed as an improvement in doll making from the fragile bisque and china material previously used. Two types of composition manufacturing processes were used: cold press and hot press. The cold-press composition manufacturing process was invented by Solomon D. Hoffmann in the 1890s. Hot-press composition began around 1920 and was an improvement in the processing.

Some early celebrity dolls were made of composition, like the Baby Peggy doll from Louis Amberg & Sons, which was a success in 1923. The American Ideal Toy Company began making composition dolls in 1907. They produced over 200 variations of dolls throughout the composition era. Their Shirley Temple doll was one of the most successful celebrity dolls. First produced in 1934, millions of the composition Shirley dolls were produced. Composition doll manufacturing lasted until the late 1940s in the US, when plastic began to be used for dolls.
