= List of Hasbro games =

This is a list of games and game lines produced by Hasbro, a large toy and game company based in the United States, or one of its former subsidiaries such as Milton Bradley and Parker Brothers.

== 0–9 ==
- 13 Dead End Drive

== A ==
- Acquire
- Aggravation
- Ask Zandar
- Attacktix: the Battle Figure Game
- Amidar (Atari 2600 port of the arcade game)
- Avalanche
- Awkward Hugs
- Axis and Allies

== B ==
- Balance of Power
- Basket Bounce
- Battleship
- Beat The Heat
- BedBugs
- Betrayal at House on the Hill
- Black Box
- Blockhead!
- Beyblade Burst
- Beyblade Burst Evolution
- Beyblade Burst Turbo
- Beyblade Burst Rise
- Blowfish Blowup
- Boggle
- Bonkers!
- Bop Bop 'n Rebop
- Bop It!
- Bowl-A-Tron 300 Automatic Bowling Game
- Buckaroo!

== C ==
- Cabbage Patch Kids: Friends to the Rescue
- Cabbage Patch Kids Hide-And-Seek Game
- Camelot
- Candy Land
- Can't Stop
- Cranium (Cadoo version recall in effect, lead paint hazard)
- Care Bears: On the Path to Care-a-Lot
- Care Bears: Warm Feelings
- Careers
- Castle Risk
- Catch Phrase
- Caught on Tape
- Challenge The Yankees
- Chow Crown
- Clue (Cluedo)
- Coinhole Touchdown
- Conflict
- Connect 4
- Contact
- Cootie
- Crazy Candles
- Crocodile Dentist
- Crossfire
- Cuponk

== D ==
- Deer Pong
- Diplomacy
- Dizzy Dizzy Dinosaur
- Domain
- Don't Break the Ice
- Don't Miss The Boat!
- Don't Spill the Beans
- Don't Step In It
- Don't Lose Your Cool
- Don't Wake Daddy
- Downfall
- Downspin
- Drac's Night Out
- Draw Something
- Dropmix
- Dungeons & Dragons: The Fantasy Adventure Board Game
- Dungeons & Dragons (Roleplaying Game)
- Dunk Hat

== E ==
- Escape from Atlantis
- Escape from Colditz
- Eggedon
- Elefun

== F ==
- Fantastic Gymnastics Game
- Fantastic Gymnastics Game Vault Challenge
- Finance
- Fireball Island
- Flinch
- Fraidy Cats
- Frogger
- Frogger II
- Frustration
- Fun City

== G ==
- Gambler
- The Game of Life
- The Game of Life Card Game
- Gator Golf
- Get a Grip
- The Game of Things
- G.I. Joe: Cobra Strike
- Gnip Gnop
- Go For It!
- Goosebumps: Terror in the Graveyard
- Goosebumps: One Day at HorrorLand Game
- The Grape Escape
- Guesstures
- Guess Who?

== H ==
- HeroQuest
- Hex
- Hey Pa! There's a Goat on the Roof
- Hi Ho! Cherry-O
- Hold that Face Game
- Hollywood Squares
- Hotels
- Hot Tub High Dive
- Hungry Hungry Hippos

== J ==
- James Bond 007
- Jenga
- Jello Jiggler

== K ==
- KerPlunk
- Krypto

== L ==
- Landslide
- Leo Goes To The Barber
- Lie Detector Game
- The Lord of the Rings: Journey to Rivendell
- Lost Kitties Game (Board Game)

== M ==
- M.A.G.S. (Music Activated Gaming System)
- The Mad Magazine Card Game
- The Mad Magazine Game
- Magic: The Gathering (Hasbro's top-selling brand)
- Make-A-Million
- Malarkey
- Mall Madness
- Mask Of the Pharaoh
- The Mansion of Happiness
- Mastermind
- Masterpiece
- Merlin
- Mille Bornes
- Mind Maze
- Mirror-Mirror (Winner of ITV's "Design a Board Game Competition")
- Monopoly (best selling board game ever according to the Guinness Book of World Records)
- Monopoly Deal
- Montezuma's Revenge
- Mouse Trap
- Mr. Bucket
- Mr. Toast (Also Known As Irresponsibility)
- Mystery Date
- Mystery Mansion

== O ==
- Omega Virus
- Operation
- Ouija
- Outburst

== P ==
- Party Mania
- Pay Day
- Peeing Puppy
- Perfection
- Pictureka
- Pie Face!, Pie Face Showdown, Pie Face Sky High & Pie Face Cannon
- Pit
- Pizza Party
- Plumber Pants
- Pokémon Master Trainer
- Pokémon Battle Trainer
- Pollyanna
- Porcupine Pop
- Probe
- Pour Taste

== Q ==
- Qubic

== R ==
- Rack-O
- Raising Hell
- Ready! Set! Spaghetti!
- Risk
- Rook
- Rummikub

== S ==
- Scattergories
- Scrabble
- Shadowlord
- Simon
- Simon Air Game
- Simon Micro Game
- Simon Optix Game
- The Slow-Motion Race Game
- Snailed It
- Sorry!
- Speak Out
- Speech Breaker
- Spinja
- Spite and Malice
- Splat!
- Star Wars: The Empire Strikes Back (Game produced for the Atari 2600 gaming system)
- Star Wars: Jedi Arena
- Star Wars: Return of the Jedi: Ewok Adventure
- Stay Alive
- Stratego
- Stretch-Out Sam
- Super Cobra
- Sweet Takes

== T ==
- Taboo
- That's Mine
- Throwing Paws
- The Game of Life Game
- Tales of the Crystals
- Thunder Road
- Tiny Pong
- Toilet Trouble
- Toilet Trouble Flushdown
- The Tonight Show Starring Jimmy Fallon Games
- Tricky Wishes
- Tornado Rex
- Torpedo Run!
- Touring
- Trouble
- Transformers: Human Alliance
- Trivial Pursuit
- Trivial Pursuit Infinite
- Trump: The Game
- Tuba-Ruba
- Twister

== U ==
- Upwords

== W ==
- Walt Disney's Sleeping Beauty (A board game based on the related film)
- Waterworks
- Wide World
- Words With Friends (board game versions)

== Y ==
- Yahtzee

== See also ==
- List of Hasbro toys
