= List of Hasbro toys =

This is a list (in alphabetical order) of toys and toylines produced by Hasbro, a largest toy and game company based in North America.

== A ==
- Air Raiders (discontinued toyline)
- Aladdin (Disney)
- Angry Birds Telepods (Rovio)
- Ant-Man (Marvel)
  - Ant-Man and the Wasp
- Apex Legends (coming soon)
- Army Ants
- The Avengers (Marvel)
  - Avengers: Age of Ultron
  - Avengers: Infinity War
  - Avengers: Endgame

== B ==
- Baby Alive
- Barney & Friends (Hasbro's rival company)
- Batman Beyond (DC)
- Battle Beasts
- Beauty and the Beast (Disney)
- Beyblade
- BeyWheelz
- Black Panther (Marvel)
- Black Widow (Marvel)
- Blythe
- Bob the Builder (Hasbro's rival company)
- Bonka Zonks
- Boohbah (WildBrain)
- Brother Bear (Disney)
- Built to Rule (abbreviated as "BTR")
- Bull's-Eye Ball
- Bop It

== C ==
- Cabbage Patch Kids (1989–1994)
- Captain America: The First Avenger (Marvel)
  - Captain America: The Winter Soldier
  - Captain America: Civil War
- Centurions
- Charmkins
- Chasin' Cheeky
- Chicken Little (Disney)
- Chomp Squad
- C.O.P.S. 'n Crooks
- CribLife
- Care Bears (American Greetings)
- Cars (Pixar)

== D ==
- Descendants (Disney)
  - Descendants 2 (Disney)
  - Descendants 3 (Disney)
- Disney Princess (Disney, 2016–2022)
- Dolly Darling dolls (1965-1968)

== E ==
- E-kara (Takara)
- Easy-Bake Oven
- Elefun
- Elena of Avalor (Disney)

== F ==
- Fantastic Four (Marvel)
  - Fantastic Four: Rise of the Silver Surfer
- The Falcon and the Winter Soldier (Marvel)
- Finding Nemo (Pixar)
- Flubber (recalled)
- Fortnite (2019–present)
- Freaktown
- Frozen (Disney, 2016–2022)
  - Olaf's Frozen Adventure
  - Frozen 2
- Funny Mooners
- Furby
- FurReal

== G ==
- Gator Golf
- Ghostbusters (Sony Pictures Releasing, introduced in 2020)
  - Ghostbusters: Afterlife
- G.I. Joe
  - G.I. Joe: America's Movable Fighting Man
  - G.I. Joe Adventure Team
  - G.I. Joe: A Real American Hero
    - Action Force (European brand of A Real American Hero)
  - G.I. Joe Extreme
  - Hall of Fame
  - Masterpiece Edition
  - G.I. Joe: Resolute
  - Timeless Collection
  - G.I. Joe vs. Cobra
  - Classic Collection
  - G.I. Joe: Sigma 6
  - G.I. Joe: The Rise of Cobra
  - G.I. Joe: Retaliation
- Giraffalaff limbo
- Glo Worm
- Gobots (licensed by Tonka)
- Gotta Dance Girls

== H ==
- Hanazuki: Full of Treasures (2017-2019)
- Harry Potter (Warner Bros.)
- Hoppity Hooper
- Hungry Hungry Hippos

== I ==
- Inhumanoids
- Iron Man (Marvel)
  - Iron Man 2
  - Iron Man 3
  - Iron Man: Armored Adventures
- The Incredibles (Pixar)
- The Incredible Hulk (Marvel)
- Indiana Jones

== J ==
- Javelin Darts (discontinued)
- Jem and the Holograms
- James Bond Jr.
- The Jungle Book 2 (Disney)
- Jurassic Park (Universal, 1993-present)
  - Jurassic World (2015-2017)

== K ==
- Kaijudo
- Kooky Spookys finger puppets
- Koosh

== L ==
- Lazer Tag
- Lilo & Stitch (Disney)
- The Lion King (Disney)
- Little Big Bites
- Littlest Pet Shop
- Little Miss No Name
- Lincoln Logs
- Lock Stars
- Lite-Brite
- Luna Petunia
- Lost Kitties

== M ==
- Madagascar (DreamWorks)
- M.A.S.K.
- Marvel Legends (Marvel)
- Marvel Super Hero Squad (Marvel)
- Marvel Universe (Marvel)
- Maxie
- Medabots
- Men in Black (Sony Pictures Releasing)
- Mighty Muggs
- Minecraft (2021-present)
- Moana (Disney)
- Monster Face
- Monsters, Inc. (Pixar)
- Moondreamers
- Mouse Trap
- Mr. Potato Head
  - Mrs. Potato Head
- My Little Pony
  - My Little Pony: Generation One
    - My Little Pony (TV series)
    - My Little Pony: The Movie (1986 film)
    - My Little Pony Tales
  - My Little Pony: Generation Two
  - My Little Pony: Generation Three
    - My Little Pony direct-to-video animated features
  - My Little Pony: Generation 4
    - My Little Pony: Friendship is Magic
    - My Little Pony: The Movie (2017 film)
  - My Little Pony: Equestria Girls
  - My Little Pony: Generation 5
    - My Little Pony: Make Your Mark
    - My Little Pony: Tell Your Tale
- My lov’ems

== N ==
- Nerf
- NakNak
- The New Batman Adventures (DC)
- Now

== O ==
- Operation
- Overwatch (2019–present)

== P ==
- Pandalian
- Peteena the Pampered Poodle (1966)
- Planet of the Apes (20th Century Studios)
- Play-Doh
- Pokémon (Nintendo, 1998-present)
- Pound Puppies
  - Pound Puppies (2010 TV series)
- Power Rangers (2019–present)
  - Power Rangers Beast Morphers
  - Power Rangers Dino Fury
  - Power Rangers Lightning Collection
- P-O-X
- Princess Gwenevere and the Jewel Riders
- Puppy Surprise

== R ==
- Raya and the Last Dragon (Disney)
- Record Breakers: World of Speed
- Rubbadubbers (Hasbro's rival company)

== S ==
- Secret Central
- Sesame Street (Sesame Workshop, 2010-2022)
- Sgt. Savage and his Screaming Eagles
- Shark Tale (DreamWorks)
- Shoezies
- Shrek 2 (DreamWorks)
- Sindy
- Sound Bites
- Speed Stars
- Spider-Man (Marvel)
  - Spider-Man 3
  - The Spectacular Spider-Man
  - Ultimate Spider-Man
  - The Amazing Spider-Man
    - The Amazing Spider-Man 2
  - Spider-Man: Homecoming
    - Spider-Man: Far From Home
    - Spider-Man: No Way Home
  - Spider-Man: Into the Spider-Verse
    - Spider-Man: Across the Spider-Verse
  - Spidey and His Amazing Friends
- Spirograph
- Star Wars (Lucasfilm, 2000–present)
  - Star Wars: Episode II – Attack of the Clones
  - Star Wars: Episode III – Revenge of the Sith
  - Star Wars: The Clone Wars
  - Star Wars Rebels
  - Star Wars: The Force Awakens
  - Rogue One: A Star Wars Story
  - Star Wars Forces of Destiny
  - Star Wars: The Last Jedi
  - Solo: A Star Wars Story
  - Star Wars: The Rise of Skywalker
  - The Mandalorian
  - Star Wars: Young Jedi Adventures
- Stretch Armstrong
  - Stretch Armstrong and the Flex Fighters
- Stuart Little (Sony Pictures Releasing)
- Super Robot Monkey Team Hyperforce Go! (Disney)
- Stargate (Amazon)
- .S.P.A.C.E.
- Super Soaker

== T ==
- Teletubbies (WildBrain)
- Thor (Marvel)
  - Thor: The Dark World
  - Thor: Ragnarok
  - Thor: Love and Thunder
- Tinkertoys 102 piece construction set
- Top Wing (Nickelodeon)
- Toy Story (Pixar)
- Transformers
  - Transformers: Generation 1
  - Transformers: Generation 2
  - BotCon
  - Beast Wars
  - Machine Wars
  - Beast Machines
  - Robots in Disguise
  - Armada
  - Universe
  - Energon
  - Alternators
  - Cybertron
  - Classics
  - Animated
  - Universe 2.0
  - Revenge of the Fallen
  - Hunt for the Decepticons
  - Reveal the Shield
  - Generations
  - Prime
  - Dark of the Moon
  - Marvel Transformers
  - Star Wars Transformers (2007)
  - Bumblebee
    - Transformers: Rise of the Beasts
  - Transformers: Cyberverse
  - Transformers: Rescue Bots
    - Transformers: Rescue Bots Academy
  - Transformers: EarthSpark
- Treasure Planet (Disney)
- Trolls (DreamWorks, 2016-present)
  - Trolls Holiday
  - Trolls: The Beat Goes On!
  - Trolls World Tour
  - Trolls: TrollsTopia
- Tweenies (BBC)

== V ==
- Visionaries: Knights of the Magical Light

== W ==
- Waddingtons
- Winston Steinburger and Sir Dudley Ding Dong
- World of Love, a line of 9" "Hippie" fashion dolls, clothes, and accessories (1971-1973)
- World Wrestling Federation (1990–1994)
- Weebles

== X ==
- Xevoz, a modular buildable action figure series
- The X's (Nickelodeon)
- X-Men Origins: Wolverine (Marvel)

== Y ==
- Yellies
- Yo-kai Watch (2016–present, international only)

== Z ==
- Zoids
- Zoops

== See also ==
- List of Hasbro games
