= Avalanche (disambiguation) =

An avalanche is a cascade of snow down a slope.

Avalanche may also refer to:

== Places ==
- Avalanche, Wisconsin, unincorporated community, US
- Avalanche Lake (disambiguation)
- Avalanche Peak (disambiguation)
- Mount Avalanche, a mountain in New Zealand

== Technology ==
- Avalanche (blockchain platform), a decentralized, open-source blockchain with smart contract functionality
- Avalanche (P2P), a proposed peer-to-peer network
- Avalanche (phishing group), a criminal syndicate which performs phishing attacks
- Avalanche breakdown, a form of electric current multiplication
- Avalanche diode
- Avalanche effect, a concept in cryptography and hashing
- Avalanche photodiode, a highly sensitive semiconductor device that converts an optical signal into an electrical signal
- Electron avalanche, a process similar to an avalanche breakdown, occurring without connection between two electrodes

== Film and television ==
- Avalanche (1923 film), an Austrian film
- Avalanche (1928 film), an American silent western film
- Avalanche (1946 film), an American film directed by Irving Allen
- Avalanche (1951 film), a French film
- Avalanche (1952 film), a Japanese film directed by Kaneto Shindō
- Avalanche (1969 film), a British film
- Avalanche (1978 film), an American disaster film with Rock Hudson and Mia Farrow
- Avalanche (1994 film), a Canadian film
- Avalanche (1999 film), an American film directed by Steve Kroschel
- The Avalanche (1919 film), an American film
- The Avalanche (1946 film), a Czech film
- "Avalanche" (Captain Scarlet and the Mysterons), a 1967 episode of Captain Scarlet and the Mysterons
- Avalanche (G.I. Joe), a fictional character in the G.I. Joe universe
- Avalanche Releasing and Avalanche Home Entertainment, distribution labels of Cinépix

== Music ==
=== Albums ===
- Avalanche (EP), 2000, by Echo & the Bunnymen
- Avalanche (Thea Gilmore album), 2003
- Avalanche (Matthew Good album), 2003, or the title song
- Avalanche (Some Velvet Sidewalk album), 1992
- Avalanche (British India album), 2010
- Avalanche (Mountain album), 1974
- Avalanche (Leah Andreone album), 2009
- The Avalanche (Sufjan Stevens album), 2006
- The Avalanche (Owen album), 2020
- Avalanche (Quadron album), 2013

=== Songs ===
- "Avalanche" (Bring Me the Horizon song), on Bring Me the Horizon's 2015 album That's the Spirit
- "Avalanche" (Leonard Cohen song), on Leonard Cohen's 1971 album Songs of Love and Hate
- "Avalanche" (Migos song), on Migos' 2021 album Culture III
- "Avalanche," a song on Ryan Adams's 2004 album Love Is Hell
- "Avalanche", on Arch Enemy's 2014 album War Eternal
- "Avalanche", on James Arthur's 2021 album It'll All Make Sense in the End
- "Avalanche", on David Cook's 2008 album David Cook
- "Avalanche", on Dawn of Solace's 2006 album The Darkness
- "Avalanche", on Marié Digby's 2009 album Breathing Underwater
- "Avalanche", on Disillusion's 2006 album Gloria
- "Avalanche", on Epica's 2012 album Requiem for the Indifferent
- "Avalanche", on The Ghost Inside's 2014 album Dear Youth
- "Avalanche", on Gigolo Aunts's 1988 album Everybody Happy
- "Avalanche", on Nick Jonas' 2014 album Nick Jonas
- "Avalanche", on Avril Lavigne's 2022 album Love Sux
- "Avalanche", on Manafest's 2010 album The Chase
- "Avalanche", on The Smashing Pumpkins' 2023 album Atum: A Rock Opera in Three Acts
- "Avalanche", on Still Remains' 2006 album The Serpent
- "Avalanche", on Thirty Seconds to Mars' 2023 album It's the End of the World but It's a Beautiful Day
- "Avalanche," a song on Wintersleep's 2003 album Wintersleep
- "Avalanche", on Youngblood Brass Band's 2003 album Center:Level:Roar

=== Performers ===
- Avalanche (band), a 1980s Norwegian disco group
- The Avalanches, an Australian electronic music group

== Gaming ==
- Avalanche (video game), 1978 arcade game released by Atari
- Avalanche (marble game), mechanical abstract strategy game with marbles
- Avalanche: The Salerno Landings, 1976 board wargame
- Avalanche chess, chess variant
- Avalanche joseki, sequence in the game of Go
- Avalanche Press, producer of wargame and roleplaying game products
- Avalanche Software, American video game developer
- Avalanche Studios, Swedish video game developer
- AVALANCHE, fictional organization in Final Fantasy VII; see Characters of the Final Fantasy VII series

== Sports ==
- Avalanche, a professional wrestling character portrayed by John Tenta
- Any move performed normally on the mat but when executed off the top or second rope in pro wrestling
- Adelaide Avalanche, an Australia hockey team
- Alaska Avalanche, a US hockey team
- Colorado Avalanche, a US hockey team
- Denver Avalanche, a US soccer team
- Hamilton Avalanche, a Canada soccer team
- Salem Avalanche, a US baseball team
- Quebec Avalanche, a Canada hockey team

== Transportation ==
- Chevrolet Avalanche, a sport utility truck
- HSV Avalanche SUV, a dual-cab utility vehicle
- Avalanche, a GWR Banking Class locomotive run by the Great Western Railway from 1846 to 1865
- Avalanche, a GWR 3031 Class locomotive that was built for and run on Great Western Railway between 1891 and 1915
- Gemballa Avalanche, a high-end automobile

== Roller coasters ==
- Avalanche (Kings Dominion), at Kings Dominion
- Avalanche (Blackpool Pleasure Beach), at Pleasure Beach Blackpool

== Other meanings ==
- Avalanche (character), a Marvel Comics character
- Avalanche (novel), by Kay Boyle
- Avalanche!, a 1954 children's novel by Anna Rutgers van der Loeff
- Avalanche, a horse in Dragon Avenger, the second book in the Age of Fire series by E. E. Knight
- "Avalanche", a 2007 story from the Railway Series book Thomas and Victoria
- Underwater avalanche (or undersea avalanche), synonyms sometimes used for turbidity currents

== See also ==
- Operation Avalanche (disambiguation)
- Lavalas (disambiguation)
- Snowball effect, a metaphorical term for a process of gradual growth
