= 1971 in games =

This page lists board and card games, wargames, and miniatures games published in 1971. For video and console games, see 1971 in video gaming.

== Games released or invented in 1971 ==
- Alexander the Great
- Caesar at Alesia
- Chainmail
- Crossfire
- Dunkirk: The Battle of France
- Grunt: The Game of Tactical Level Combat in Vietnam
- Gnip Gnop
- Hardtack
- Landslide
- Mastermind
- Nebula 19
- Origins of World War II
- Stay Alive
- Uno

== See also ==
- 1971 in video gaming
