= Wide Wide World (disambiguation) =

Wide Wide World is an American documentary series airing from 1955 to 1958 on NBC.

Wide Wide World may also refer to:

- The Wide, Wide World, an 1850 American novel by Susan Warner, published under the pseudonym Elizabeth Wetherell

== See also ==
- Whole Wide World (disambiguation)
- Wide World
- Wild Wild World
