= Shadow Lord =

Shadow Lord or Shadowlord may refer to:

== Politics ==
- Shadow Lord Chancellor, a member of the British Shadow Cabinet

== Literature ==
- Shadow Lord (novel), a Star Trek novel
- The Shadow Lord, a villain from the Deltora Quest series

== Television ==
- Star Wars: Maul – Shadow Lord, an animated series

== Toys ==
- Shadowlord (board game), a board game published by Parker Brothers in 1983

== Video games ==
- The Shadowlord, an antagonist in the video game Nier
- The Shadow Lord, an antagonist in the video game Final Fantasy XI
- The Shadowlords, characters in Ultima V: Warriors of Destiny

== See also ==
- Lords of Shadow
