= Lists of corporate assets =

This page is an index for lists of some assets owned by large corporations.

== Holding companies ==
- List of assets owned by Berkshire Hathaway
- List of assets owned by Bertelsmann
- List of assets owned by Nestlé
- List of assets owned by Procter & Gamble
- List of assets owned by Shaw Communications
- List of assets owned by Sony
- List of assets owned by Unilever
- List of assets owned by Vivendi
- List of assets owned by Walmart

== Supermarket companies ==
- List of assets owned by Ahold Delhaize
- List of assets owned by Albertsons
- List of assets owned by Canadian Tire
- List of assets owned by Hudson's Bay Company
- List of assets owned by Kroger
- List of assets owned by Loblaw Companies
- List of assets owned by Schwarz Gruppe
- List of assets owned by Wakefern Food Corporation
- List of assets owned by Walmart

== Media companies ==
Media companies are included here based on their inclusion in an online list provided by the Columbia Journalism Review, published by the Columbia University Graduate School of Journalism. The country in which the company has its corporate headquarters is noted after each company name. (As of 11 March 2008 this list is incomplete.)

- List of ABS-CBN Corporation subsidiaries
- List of assets owned by Advance Publications
- List of assets owned by Amazon MGM Studios
- List of assets owned by American Media
- List of assets owned by AMC Networks
- List of assets owned by Bell Media
- List of assets owned by Belo Corporation
- List of assets owned by Bertelsmann
- List of assets owned by CanWest Global Communications
- List of assets owned by Clear Channel Communications
- List of assets owned by Comcast
- List of assets owned by Corus Entertainment
- List of assets owned by Fox Corporation
- List of assets owned by Gannett
- List of assets owned by GMA Network Inc.
- List of assets owned by Hearst Corporation
- List of assets owned by Hubbard Broadcasting Corporation
- List of assets owned by NBCUniversal
- List of assets owned by News Corp
- List of assets owned by The New York Times Company
- List of assets owned by Rogers Communications
- List of assets owned by Sinclair Broadcast Group
- List of assets owned by Starz Entertainment Corp.
- List of assets owned by TV5 Network, Inc.
- List of assets owned by Nexstar Media Group
- List of assets owned by Village Voice Media
- List of assets owned by Vivendi
- List of assets owned by the Walt Disney Company
- List of assets owned by Washington Post Company
- List of assets owned by Saban Capital Group
- List of assets owned by Sony

== Video game companies ==
- List of assets owned by Activision
- List of assets owned by Electronic Arts
- List of assets owned by Embracer Group
- List of assets owned by Nintendo
- List of assets owned by PlayStation Studios
- List of assets owned by Take-Two Interactive
- List of assets owned by Tencent
- List of assets owned by Warner Bros. Games
- List of assets owned by Xbox Game Studios

== Food and drink companies ==
- List of assets owned by AB InBev
- List of assets owned by Bacardi
- List of assets owned by Cadbury
- List of assets owned by Cara Operations
- List of assets owned by CKE Restaurants
- List of assets owned by The Coca-Cola Company
- List of assets owned by ConAgra Foods, Inc.
- List of assets owned by Diageo
- List of assets owned by Focus Brands
- List of assets owned by The Hershey Company
- List of assets owned by Hormel Foods
- List of assets owned by Inspire Brands
- List of assets owned by The J.M. Smucker Company
- List of assets owned by Keurig Dr Pepper
- List of assets owned by Kraft Heinz
- List of assets owned by Mars, Incorporated
- List of assets owned by Molson Coors
- List of assets owned by Nabisco
- List of assets owned by Nestlé
- List of assets owned by PepsiCo
- List of assets owned by Pernod Ricard
- List of assets owned by Restaurant Brands International
- List of assets owned by Yum! Brands, Inc.

== Toy companies ==
- List of assets owned by Hasbro (Games only)
- List of assets owned by Hasbro (Toys only)
- List of assets owned by Mattel (Games only)
- List of assets owned by Mattel (Toys only)
- List of assets owned by Pressman

== See also ==
- Concentration of media ownership
- Stock-taking
- Hostile takeover
- List of conglomerates
- List of multinational corporations
