= The Whole Wide World (album) =

Compilation album by Wreckless Eric
- Released: 1979
- Genre: Rock
- Label: Stiff

Wreckless Eric chronology
The Wonderful World of Wreckless Eric (1978)	The Whole Wide World (1979)	Big Smash! (1980)

Professional ratings
Review scores
Source	Rating
AllMusic	4.5/5 stars
Christgau's Record Guide	A−

The Whole Wide World is a 1979 compilation album by British new wave musician Wreckless Eric, intended to break him in the American market. It consists of his singles up to that point, some b-sides and selected tracks from the albums Wreckless Eric and The Wonderful World of Wreckless Eric.

In 1980, an LP with the same track listing was added as a bonus to the album Big Smash!

== Track listing ==
All songs written by Wreckless Eric.

=== CD ===
1. "Intro"
2. "Whole Wide World"
3. "Take the Cash"
4. "Let's Go to the Pictures"
5. "Walking on the Surface of the Moon"
6. "Hit & Miss Judy"
7. "I Wish It Would Rain"
8. "Reconnez Cherie"
9. "Veronica"
10. "Brain Thieves"
11. "Semaphore Signals"
12. "I Need a Situation"
13. "The Final Taxi"
14. "There Isn't Anything Else"
