= Stay Alive (disambiguation) =

Stay Alive is an American slasher film released by Hollywood Pictures in 2006.

Stay Alive may also refer to:

== Music ==
- "Stay Alive (song)" a 2022 song by Jungkook
- "Stay Alive", a song from the 2015 Broadway musical Hamilton
- "Stay Alive", a song by Bachman-Turner Overdrive from Head On
- "Stay Alive", a song by Basshunter from The Old Shit album
- "Stay Alive", a song by Nessa Barrett from Aftercare
- "Stay Alive", a song by Poison from Native Tongue
- "Stay Alive", a song by Trapt from Trapt Live!
- "Stay Alive", a song by Galantis from The Devil's Tax Return
- "Stay Alive", a song used as an end theme in the anime series Re:Zero − Starting Life in Another World
- Stay Alive (Laura Jane Grace album), a 2020 album by Laura Jane Grace
- Stay Alive (Nina album), a 2011 Philippine album by Nina

== Other uses ==
- Stay Alive (game), a strategy game

== See also ==
- Staying Alive (disambiguation)
