= Captains of Industry (disambiguation) =

Captains of industry are business leaders.

Captain of industry and similar can also mean:

- Captains of Industry (band), a group formed by former Stiff Records performer Wreckless Eric
- Captains of Industry (record label), an independent record label based in Durham, UK
