= Whole Wide World =

Whole Wide World may refer to:

- The Whole Wide World, a film about pulp fiction writer Robert E. Howard
- "Whole Wide World" (song), a 1974 song by Wreckless Eric
- The Whole Wide World (album), a 1979 album by Wreckless Eric
- "Whole Wide World" (A'Me Lorain song), a 1989 song by A'Me Lorain from the album Starring In...Standing in a Monkey Sea
- "Whole Wide World", a 2023 song by the Rolling Stones from the album Hackney Diamonds
- Whole Wide World, a novel by Paul J. McAuley
