= Army Ants (disambiguation) =

An army ant is any species of ant known for aggressive predatory foraging groups.

Army Ants may also refer to:

- Army Ants (toy line), a 1987 toy soldier line from Hasbro
- Army Ants, a scrapped Disney animated film from 1998.
- "Army Ants", a 1994 song by Stone Temple Pilots from the album Purple
- "Army Ants", a 1997 song by The Tea Party from the album Transmission
- "Army Ants", a 2006 song by Tom Waits from the album Orphans: Brawlers, Bawlers & Bastards
