= Operation Avalanche (disambiguation) =

Operation Avalanche is the name given to the Allied invasion of Italy in 1943.

Operation Avalanche may also refer to:

- Operation Avalanche, the Austro-Hungarian diversionary attack on Italy in the First World War at the Battle of the Piave River
- Operation Avalanche (child pornography investigation), A U.S. investigation of child pornography on the Internet, launched 1999
- Operation Avalanche (Afghanistan), a U.S.-led coalition offensive in Afghanistan, 2003
- Operation Avalanche (film), a 2016 film about faking the Apollo 11 Moon landing

== See also ==
- Avalanche (disambiguation)
