= List of assets owned by AMC Networks =

AMC Global Media. is an American mass media and entertainment corporation headquartered in 11 Penn Plaza, New York City. The company owns and operates the AMC cable channel, BBC America, IFC, Sundance TV, and We TV. It also owns the art house movie theater IFC Center in New York City; the independent film companies IFC Films and RLJE Films, the anime licensor Sentai Filmworks, the premium subscription streaming services AMC+, IFC Films Unlimited, Acorn TV, Allblk, Shudder, Sundance Now, Philo, and Hidive, and a minority interest in the Canadian production studio Shaftesbury Films.

This is a list of assets owned by AMC Global Media.

== Assets ==
Italic text indicates joint ventures. BritBox is an exception, as AMC only owns part of its American operations. It is a joint venture between the BBC and ITV plc outside the US.

| Category | Name |
|---|---|
| Television Channels | AMC |
| Television Channels | BBC America |
| Television Channels | IFC |
| Television Channels | Sundance TV |
| Television Channels | We TV |
| Streaming Services | AMC+ |
| Streaming Services | Acorn TV |
| Streaming Services | Allblk |
| Streaming Services | BritBox |
| Streaming Services | Philo |
| Streaming Services | Hidive |
| Streaming Services | Shudder |
| Streaming Services | IFC Films Unlimited |
| Streaming Services | Sundance Now |
| Streaming Services | We TV+ |
| Other Units | IFC Films |
| Other Units | Acorn DVD |
| Other Units | RLJE Films |
| Other Units | Sentai Studios |
| Other Units | Sentai Filmworks |
| Other Units | AMC Networks International |

=== FAST channels ===
A list of AMC-branded FAST channels available on third-party streaming platforms.

- Allblk Gems
- AMC en Español
- AMC Showcase
- AMC Thriller
- Anime x HIDIVE
- BBC Earth
- BBC Food
- BBC Home & Garden
- BBC Kids
- IFC Films Picks
- IFC Slightly Off
- Stories by AMC
- The Walking Dead Universe
- WE tv All Reality
- WE tv All Weddings

=== Other assets ===
- MiTú (investment)
- Levity Live (majority stake)
- Shaftesbury Films (minority stake)
- Sentai Filmworks
- AMC Networks Publishing

==== AMC Networks International ====
On October 28, 2013, AMC Networks announced it would acquire most of Chellomedia, an international operator of cable networks, from Liberty Global for around $1.04 billion. The acquisition did not include Chello Benelux, owners of Film1 and Sport1. On February 2, 2014, the transaction was completed. What was formerly Chellomedia is now known as AMC Networks International and will allow AMC Networks to distribute its programming worldwide.

==== BBC America joint venture ====
On October 23, 2014, AMC confirmed it had purchased a 49.9% stake in BBC America, with BBC Studios retaining the remaining share of the network. The joint venture will also give AMC, which itself distributes the BBC World News channel in the United States, operational control in BBC America, which will be managed as a stand-alone from AMC's other channels. AMC bought out the BBC's 50.01 stake in November 2024, although the BBC still remains connected to the channel.

=== Former assets ===
- Anime Network
- Bravo acquired by NBC in 2002 for $1.25 billion.
- Funny or Die
- MuchMusic USA with CHUM Limited; became Fuse on May 19, 2003; spun off as a part of The Madison Square Garden Company in 2010; spun off as part of spun off further in 2014 as Fuse Media, LLC.
- News 12 Networks
- Escapade/The Playboy Channel
- SportsChannel (joint-venture, later Fox Sports Networks/Bally Sports/FanDuel Sports Network)
- Voom HD Networks
- Wedding Central was shuttered on July 1, 2011; programming was moved to WE TV, and the website was redirected to WE TV's weddings section.

== See also ==
- Lists of corporate assets
