= Construction Time & Demolition =

Studio album by Wreckless Eric
- Released: 6 April 2018
- Genre: Indie rock
- Length: 36:27
- Label: Southern Domestic

Wreckless Eric chronology
AmERICa (2015)	Construction Time & Demolition (2018)	Transience (2019)

Singles from Construction Time & Demolition
- 1. "Gateway to Europe" Released: 19 February 2018

Professional ratings
Aggregate scores
Source	Rating
Metacritic	82/100
Review scores
Source	Rating
AllMusic	4.5/5 stars
Blurt Magazine	3/5 stars

Construction Time & Demolition is a studio album by the English musician Wreckless Eric. It was released on 30 March 2018 by Southern Domestic Records.

== Critical reception ==
Construction Time & Demolition was met with "universal acclaim" reviews from critics. At Metacritic, which assigns a weighted average rating out of 100 to reviews from mainstream publications, this release received an average score of 82 based on 7 reviews.

Writing on behalf of AllMusic, Stephen Thomas Erlewine noted the album is Eric's most "liveliest records he's ever made", while also pointing out there are "rough edges throughout, including instrumentals that function as atmospheric bridges between the major songs."

== Track listing ==
Construction Time & Demolition track listing
No.	Title	Length
1.	"Gateway to Europe"	5:13
2.	"The World Revolved Around Me"	2:05
3.	"Flash"	2:08
4.	"Mexican Fenders #1"	1:01
5.	"They Don't Mean No Harm"	3:46
6.	"Wow & Flutter"	3:36
7.	"Forget Who You Are"	6:21
8.	"40 Years"	3:19
9.	"The Two of Us"	3:42
10.	"Unnatural Act"	3:49
11.	"Mexican Fenders #2"	1:27
