= Transience (Wreckless Eric album) =

Transcience

Studio album by Wreckless Eric
- Released: 17 May 2019
- Length: 35:10
- Label: Southern Domestic

Wreckless Eric chronology
Construction Time & Demolition (2018)	Transcience (2019)

Singles from Transience
- 1. "Tiny House" Released: 6 May 2019

Professional ratings
Aggregate scores
Source	Rating
Metacritic	83/100
Review scores
Source	Rating
AllMusic	4/5 stars
Backseat Mafia	7.5/10
Sound Blab	9/10

Transcience is a studio album by the English musician Wreckless Eric. It was released on 17 May 2019 through Southern Domestic.

== Critical reception ==
Transience was met with universal acclaim reviews from critics. At Metacritic, which assigns a weighted average rating out of 100 to reviews from mainstream publications, this release received an average score of 83, based on 5 reviews.

== Track listing ==
No.	Title	Length
1.	"Father to the Man"	0:20
2.	"Strange Locomotion"	4:39
3.	"The Half of It"	7:02
4.	"Dead End"	2:18
5.	"Creepy People (In the Middle of the Night)"	4:46
6.	"Tiny House"	2:02
7.	"Indelible Stain"	4:09
8.	"California/Handyman"	7:25
