= Wreckless Eric =

English singer-songwriter (born 1954)

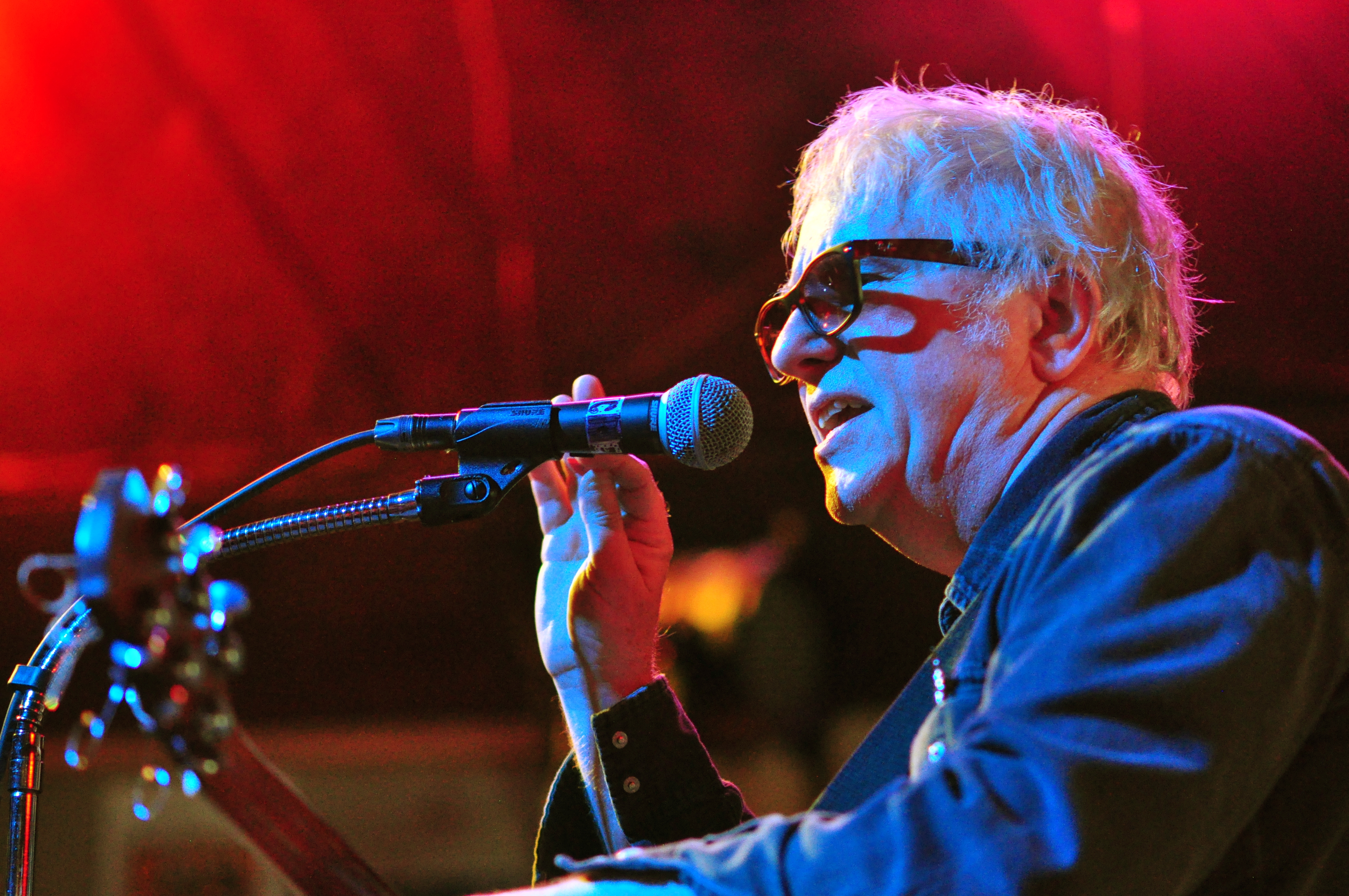
- Wreckless Eric, 2018

Background information
- Born: Eric Goulden; 18 May 1954 (age 72); Newhaven, East Sussex, England
- Genres: Rock; new wave; punk rock
- Occupation: Singer-songwriter
- Years active: 1974–present
- Labels: Stiff; Go! Discs; Empire; New Rose; Kelt; Hangman; Humbug; Vibroscope
- Website: Official website

Eric Goulden (born 18 May 1954), known as Wreckless Eric, is an English rock and new wave singer-songwriter, best known for his 1977 single "Whole Wide World" on Stiff Records. More than two decades after its release, the song was included in Mojo magazine's list of the best punk rock singles of all time. It was also acclaimed as one of the "top 40 singles of the alternative era 1975–2000".

== Early life ==
Wreckless Eric was born on 18 May 1954 in Newhaven, East Sussex. He is a cousin of actress Gemma Arterton through her mother. In 1973, he began attending Art School in Hull, where he joined bands such as Dirty Henry that played local clubs. On a break after his first year at school he saw Kilburn and the High Roads in Oldham. Struck by their honest approach to music, Eric decided to employ the same to his composing and performing. His next band, Addis and the Flip Tops, were the first incarnation of what would later be known as the DIY style. He first became known as one of the original members of the late 1970s Stiff Records artist roster, along with Ian Dury, Elvis Costello and Nick Lowe.

Eric's first appearance on record was "Whole Wide World" on the Stiff label sampler A Bunch of Stiff Records in April 1977. The single version of that song was finally released in August. The song was produced by, and featured bass and guitar by Nick Lowe, with Steve Goulding on drums. The following month, the song was one of five tracks broadcast for the first of two sessions Eric recorded for DJ John Peel at BBC Radio 1. The song went on to make number 47 in John Peel's 'Festive Fifty', the so-called 'lost list' of 1977; it was also number 8 in the Sounds critics' singles of the year. The song's reputation has grown over the years and numerous bands have covered "Whole Wide World", such as the Lightning Seeds, Mental As Anything, The Monkees (on their Pool It! album in 1987), The Proclaimers (on their 2007 album Life with You), Paul Westerberg, The Bahamas, and Cage The Elephant (on their 2017 album Unpeeled), Finn Wolfhard (during his 2026 live shows).

His debut album Wreckless Eric was a Top 50 hit in the UK Albums Chart. His second album with Stiff Records was The Wonderful World of Wreckless Eric.

== End of Stiff days ==
Eric became increasingly unhappy with Stiff Records' business ideas and promotion. The label forced Eric to work with songwriting teams, hired backing bands and assigned his music to unsympathetic producers. By 1980, shortly after the release of Big Smash!, he decided to leave Stiff and record music at his home studio. Despite leaving the mainstream music business, he has continued writing songs and performing consistently throughout Europe and the United States. Since the 1980s Eric has released albums on numerous independent record labels.

== Post-Stiff bands ==
Eric's post-Stiff bands/projects include: the Captains of Industry, the Len Bright Combo, the Hitsville House Band, with one album Karaoke (1997) recorded under his real name, Eric Goulden.

== Post-Stiff albums ==
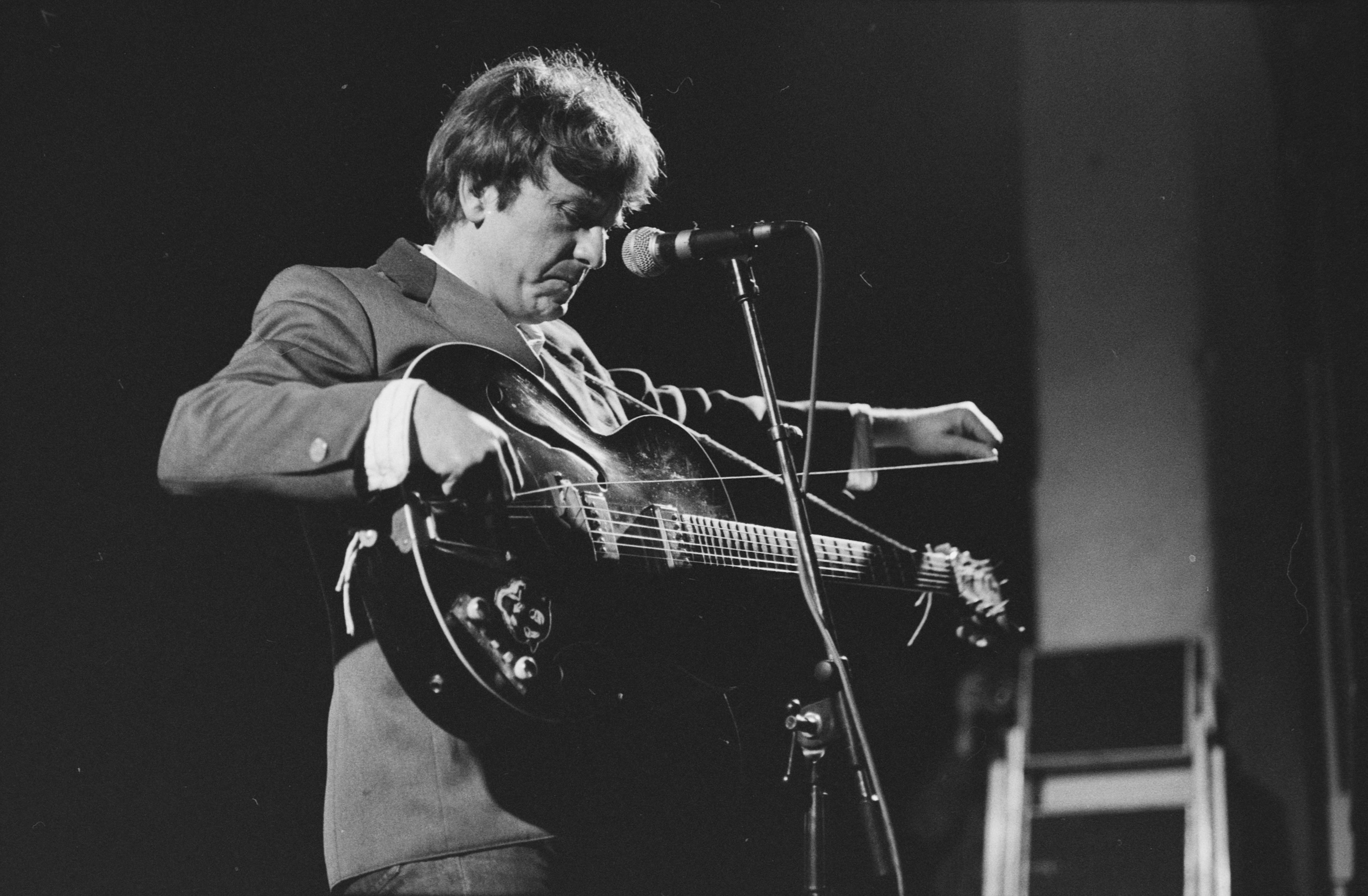
Replacing a string (1989)

In 1985, he released A Roomful of Monkeys with the Captains of Industry. It was followed in 1986 by a couple of homemade garage albums with 'The Len Bright Combo'. He always stayed in touch with Ian Dury and the Blockheads – two Blockheads, Norman Watt-Roy and Mick Gallagher, were in the Captains of Industry.

In 1989, he signed to New Rose Records as Eric Goulden, released the homemade Le Beat Group Electrique with bassist André Barreau and drummer Catfish Truton. This same year he moved to France, in a quiet countryside corner where he stayed for about ten years. By the time he made this move to the vineyard country, he had already ended his "career of full-time alcoholic", that he referred to in his autobiography.

Eric toured Eastern Europe in a 1960s Peugeot car, both solo and with his band. In 1990, he released a second Le Beat Group Electrique album, recorded live in a New Rose record shop in Paris, entitled At the Shop with Eduardo Leal de la Gala and Fabrice Bertran on the drums. Together they formed the Hitsville House Band.

Eric returned to the UK in 1998, wrote his autobiography A Dysfunctional Success – The Wreckless Eric Manual about his life in England in the punk rock years and the music industry, ending at his departure for France. Eric contributed his version of "Clevor Trever" (sic) to the Ian Dury tribute album Brand New Boots and Panties released in 2001. A new album Bungalow Hi was home-recorded, produced and released in 2004.

== Later career ==
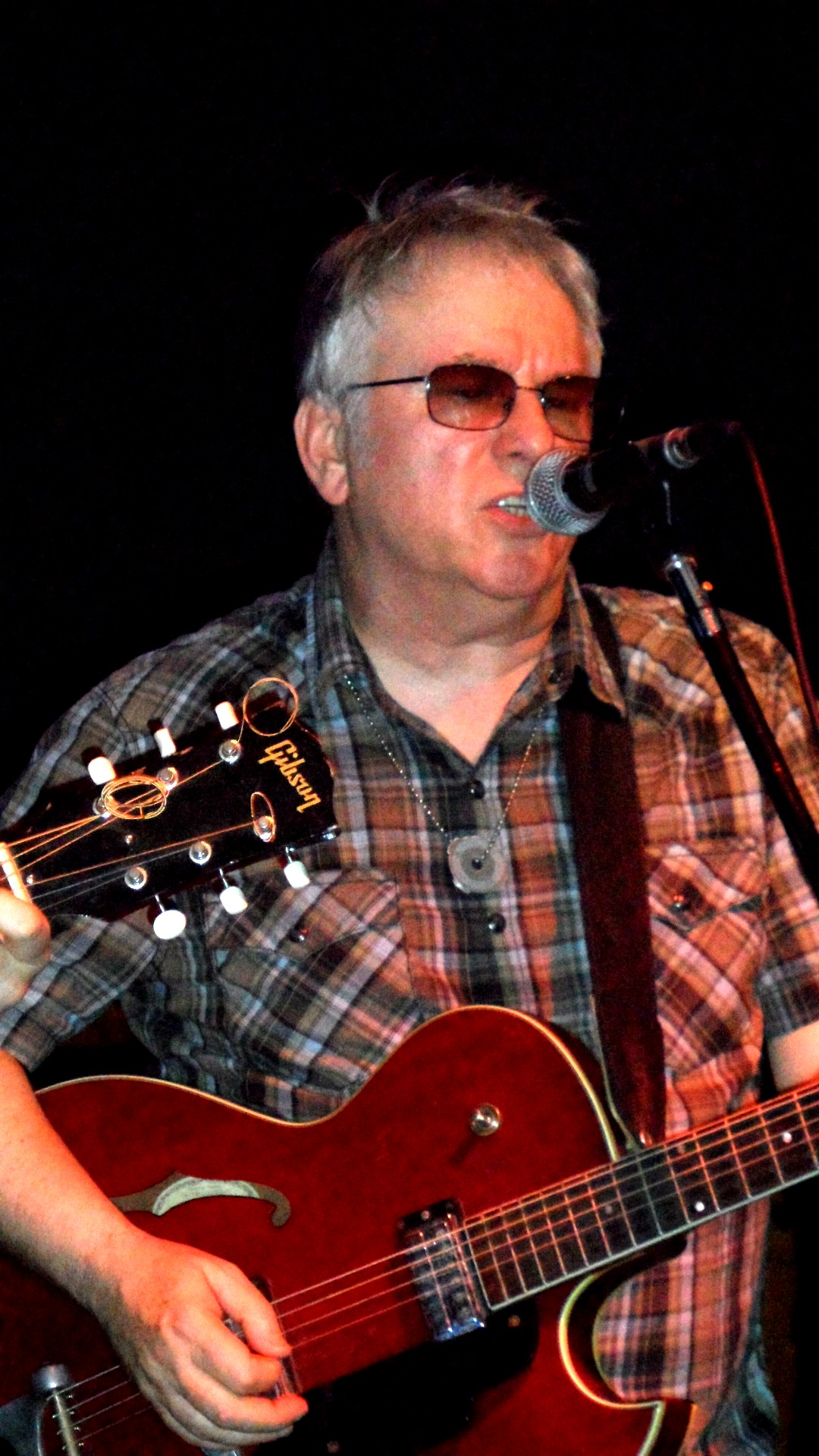
Wreckless Eric, Chicago, 2013

"Whole Wide World" appears in the 1996 film Different for Girls, and the 2002 film Heartlands. In the 2006 film Stranger Than Fiction, starring Will Ferrell, Ferrell sings "Whole Wide World" while playing the guitar, until the original Wreckless Eric version takes over.

In 2008, Wreckless Eric & Amy Rigby, recorded with his wife and co-performer, singer-songwriter Amy Rigby, was released. The album had a sound that was described as including "lots of strummed acoustic guitars, insistent and melodic bass lines and atmospherics created by vintage keyboards, synthesizers, processed electric guitars and electronic effects". They toured to support the album.

Eric joined The Proclaimers onstage at Edinburgh Castle in Scotland, on 19 July 2008, to perform "Whole Wide World" which they covered on their album Life with You. Eric and Amy Rigby joined John Wesley Harding onstage at Wiggins Park in Camden, New Jersey, United States, on 25 July 2009, to perform "(I'd Go the) Whole Wide World".

In September 2010, Eric and Rigby offered a track for a compilation album, Daddy Rockin Strong: A Tribute to Nolan Strong & The Diablos. They recorded a cover of the 1950s doo-wop song "I Want To Be Your Happiness." The Wind Records, along with Norton Records, released the album.

After some years living in France with Rigby, Goulden moved with her to the United States in 2011. As of November 2011, they lived in upstate New York, and continued to tour together.

In 2012, Eric and Rigby recorded a version of the Bread song "The Guitar Man", for the fund raising CD Super Hits of the Seventies, for the radio station WFMU.

In December 2013, Fire Records re-released both Len Bright Combo records and the band reunited for a one off show at The Lexington in London. In 2014, Fire Records re-released Le Beat Group Electrique, The Donovan of Trash and 12 O'Clock Stereo.

In December 2016, Eric appeared in the Mighty Mighty Bosstones Hometown Throwdown at the House of Blues in Boston. He sang "Whole Wide World".

In April 2018, he released an album of new songs, Construction Time & Demolition, supported with shows in the UK, the US, and Canada.

"(I'd Go The) Whole Wide World" appears in the eighth episode of the 2019 Amazon TV series The Widow.

In December 2024, Eric supported the Lightning Seeds at the Cambridge and London dates of their 35th Anniversary tour, and collaborated with them on a cover of "Whole Wide World".

== Discography ==
=== Albums ===
As Wreckless Eric

- Wreckless Eric (March 1978: Stiff Records, SEEZ 6) No. 46 UK Albums Chart
- The Wonderful World of Wreckless Eric (October 1978: Stiff, SEEZ 9)
- Big Smash! (February 1980: Stiff, SEEZ 21) [double, inc. compilation album] No. 30 UK
- The Donovan of Trash (1991)
- Bungalow Hi (2004)
- AmERICa (2015)
- Construction Time & Demolition (2018)
- Transience (2019)
- Leisureland (2023)

=== Compilations ===
- The Whole Wide World (December 1979) [compilation album] US release
- Almost a Jubilee: 25 Years at the BBC (with Gaps) (2003)
- Hits, Misses, Rags and Tatters (2010)

With Captains of Industry

- Roomful of Monkeys (1984)

With The Len Bright Combo

- The Len Bright Combo Presents... (1985)
- Combo Time (1986)

(The two Len Bright Combo albums were re-released on a single CD on Eric's Southern Domestic label in 2004).

With Le Beat Group Electrique

- Le Beat Group Electrique (1989)
- At the Shop (1990)

With Hitsville House Band

- 12 O'Clock Stereo (1996)

As Eric Goulden

- Karaoke (1997)

With Amy Rigby

- Wreckless Eric & Amy Rigby (2008)
- Two-Way Family Favourites (2010)
- A Working Museum (2012)

=== Various artists compilation album appearances ===
- A Bunch of Stiff Records (1977)
- Live Stiffs Live (1978: Stiff Records, GET 1) No. 28 UK Albums Chart
- Heroes & Cowards (1978)
- Can't Start Dancing (1978)
- "Whole Wide World" featured on the That Summer! compilation album (June 1979) UK No. 36
- The Last Compilation Album (1980)
- The Stiff Records Box Set (1991)
- DiY 3: Teenage Kicks – UK Pop I (1976–79) (1993)
- Stranger Than Fiction Soundtrack (2006)
- The Sandinista! Project (2007)
- "Sick Organism" featured on The Good Lyre - Songs of John Wesley Harding (2021)

=== Singles ===
Band name	Date	'A' side	'B' side	Label	Cat. No.
Wreckless Eric	Aug 1977	"Whole Wide World"	"Semaphore Signals"	Stiff	BUY 16
Wreckless Eric	Feb 1978	"Reconnez Cherie"	"Rags And Tatters"	Stiff	BUY 25
Wreckless Eric	Oct 1978	"Take The K.A.S.H."	"Girlfriend"	Stiff	BUY 34
Wreckless Eric	Dec 1978	"Crying, Waiting, Hoping"	"I Wish It Would Rain"	Stiff	BUY 40
Wreckless Eric	Oct 1979	"Hit And Miss Judy"	"Let's Go to the Pictures"	Stiff	BUY 49
Wreckless Eric	Jan 1980	"A Popsong"	"Reconnez Cherie"	Stiff	BUY 64
Wreckless Eric	Mar 1980	"Broken Doll"	"I Need A Situation"	Stiff	BUY 75
Captains of Industry	Nov 1984	"Lifeline"	"A Girl in a Million"	Go! Discs	GOD 6
Len Bright Combo	Apr 1986	"Someone Must've Nailed Us Together"	"Mona"	Empire	LEN 1
Wreckless Eric	Oct 1989	"It's A Sick World"	"Reconnez Cherie"	New Rose	NEW 100
Wreckless Eric	May 1990	"Haunted House"	"Depression (version Francaise)"	New Rose	NEW 136
Wreckless Eric	Dec 1990	"Yuletide Forty-Five"		Kelt	
Wreckless Eric	Feb 1993	"Joe Meek"	"Tell Me I'm The Only One"	Hangman	SFTRI 226
Hitsville House Band	1996	"The Girl with the Wandering Eye"	"Palace of Tears" / "Laurence of Arabia on Ice"	Humbug	
Wreckless Eric	2002	"Sweet Jane"	"Continuity Girl"	Vibroscope	
Wreckless Eric	2007	"Whole Wide World 4 England"	"Wayne Rooney's Foot"	Fierce Panda	

== See also ==
- List of new wave artists
- List of Peel Sessions
- Music of the United Kingdom (1970s)

== Bibliography ==
- "Wreckless Eric" Goulden: A Dysfunctional Success – The Wreckless Eric Manual, Do Not Press (2004), ISBN 1-904316-18-2
