= List of assets owned by Vivendi =

This is a list of assets owned by Vivendi.

== Video games ==
- Gameloft
  - Gameloft Barcelona
  - Gameloft Bucharest
  - Gameloft Kharkiv
  - Gameloft Montreal
  - Gameloft Brisbane
  - Gameloft South-East Asia
  - Gameloft Lviv
  - Gameloft Sofia
  - Gameloft Toronto
  - Gameloft Paris
  - FreshPlanet
  - The Other Guys

== Publishing ==
- V Collection
  - Harper’s Bazaar
  - Côté Maison
  - IDEAT
  - Milk
  - The Good Life

== Equity investments ==
- MFE (4.6%)
- PRISA (9.9%)
- Banijay Group (19.21%)

== Former assets ==
- Vivendi Universal Entertainment
- NBCUniversal (20% stake, now fully owned by Comcast)
- Universal Studios (now owned by NBCUniversal)
- Gaiam Vivendi Entertainment (division of Universal Pictures, now owned by Cineverse)
- Vivendi Games
- Activision Blizzard (5.8% stake, now owned by Microsoft)
- Maroc Telecom (53% stake, now owned by Etisalat)
- SFR (sold to Altice)
- Global Village Telecom (sold to Telefônica Vivo)
- Vivendi Environment (divested through IPO between 2000 and 2002, now known as Veolia)
- Ubisoft (shares sold on 20 March 2018 to various investors)
- Universal Music Group (divested through IPO between 2021)
- Editis (now owned by Czech Media Invest)
- Vivendi Entertainment
- Canal+ Group (became independent in December 2024)
- Dailymotion (now owned by Canal+)
- Havas (became independent in December 2024)
- Prisma Media (now owned by Louis Hachette Group)
- Lagardère Group (57.66% stake, now owned by Louis Hachette Group)
- See Tickets (now owned by CTS Eventim)
- MyBestPro
- Watchever
- L'Olympia (now owned by Canal+)
- Flab Prod (now owned by StudioCanal)
- Canal Factory
- Pernel Media (now owned by StudioCanal)
- TIM (2.4% stake, now owned by Poste Italiane)

== See also ==
- Lists of corporate assets
