= Staying Alive =

Staying Alive or Stayin' Alive may refer to:

== Music ==
- "Stayin' Alive", a 1977 song by Bee Gees from the Saturday Night Fever soundtrack
- "Staying Alive (Soundtrack)", the soundtrack album from the film Staying Alive
- Stayin' Alive (J-Flexx album), 2007
- Stayin' Alive (Jackyl album), 1998
- "Staying Alive" (song), a song by DJ Khaled featuring Drake and Lil Baby, 2022
- "Staying Alive", a song by Nina from the album Stay Alive, 2011
- "Staying Alive", a song by Cursive from The Ugly Organ, 2003
- "Stayin' Alive", a 2013 song by Capital Cities from Stayin' Alive

== Film and television ==
- Staying Alive (1983 film), the sequel to Saturday Night Fever, named after the Bee Gees song
- Staying Alive (2012 film), an Indian film
- Staying Alive (2015 film), a Norwegian film by Maipo Film
- Staying Alive (TV series), a 1996–1997 British television medical drama series
- "Stayin' Alive", a 2000 episode of animated series Happy Tree Friends

== Other ==
- MTV Staying Alive, an AIDS-awareness campaign initiative

== See also ==
- Stay Alive (disambiguation)
- Staying a Life, a 1990 album by Accept
