= Big Smash! =

Studio album by Wreckless Eric
- Released: 1980
- Genre: Rock
- Label: Stiff
- Producer: Bazza

Wreckless Eric chronology
The Wonderful World of Wreckless Eric (1978)	Big Smash! (1980)	The Donovan of Trash (1991)

Professional ratings
Review scores
Source	Rating
AllMusic	4.5/5 stars
Christgau's Record Guide	B+
The Encyclopedia of Popular Music	2/5 stars
Record Mirror	4/5 stars
Smash Hits	8/10

Big Smash! is the third album by the English musician Wreckless Eric. It was released as a double LP (SEEZ 21) and as a cassette (ZSEES 21) on 29 February 1980.

While the first LP comprised new material, the extra LP was the U.S.-only compilation album The Whole Wide World (1979). Big Smash! was re-issued as a 2-CD set in 2007 with 3 bonus tracks (CDSEEZ 21).

== Critical reception ==
Billboard praised the "good energetic and basic rock'n'roll" of the album and compared it with the oeuvre of Dave Edmunds, noticing that "Eric has his own sound, personality and point of view". Robert Christgau remarked in his Record Guide that "'Tis said the spunk has gone out of the lad, but though he does wax lyrical at times – I like the one where he admires the style of a girl handing in her tube ticket – he's as rude and scrawny as ever."

== Track listings ==
=== Double LP (1980) ===
Side 1

1. "A Popsong"
2. "Tonight (Is My Night)"
3. "Too Busy"
4. "Broken Doll"
5. "Can I Be Your Hero?"
6. "Back in My Hometown"

Side 2

1. "It'll Soon Be the Weekend"
2. "Strange Towns"
3. "Excuse Me"
4. "Break My Mind"
5. "Good Conversation"
6. "Out of the Blue"
7. "A Popsong (reprise)"

Side 3

1. "(I'd Go the) Whole Wide World"
2. "Take The Cash (K.A.S.H.)"
3. "Let's Go to the Pictures" (Alternate version)
4. "Walking on the Surface of the Moon" (Alternate version)
5. "Hit & Miss Judy"
6. "I Wish It Would Rain"

Side 4

1. "Reconnez Cherie"
2. "Veronica"
3. "Brain Thieves"
4. "Semaphore Signals"
5. "I Need a Situation"
6. "The Final Taxi"
7. "There Isn't Anything Else"

=== 2CD set (2007) ===
CD 1

1. "A Popsong"
2. "Tonight (Is My Night)"
3. "Too Busy"
4. "Broken Doll"
5. "Can I Be Your Hero?"
6. "Back in My Hometown"
7. "It'll Soon Be the Weekend"
8. "Strange Towns"
9. "Excuse Me"
10. "Break My Mind"
11. "Good Conversation"
12. "Out of the Blue"

CD 2

1. "(I'd Go the) Whole Wide World"
2. "Take the Cash (K.A.S.H.)"
3. "Let's Go to the Pictures"
4. "Walking on the Surface of the Moon"
5. "Hit & Miss Judy"
6. "I Wish It Would Rain"
7. "Reconnez Cherie"
8. "Veronica"
9. "Brain Thieves"
10. "Semaphore Signals"
11. "I Need a Situation"
12. "The Final Taxi"
13. "There Isn't Anything Else"
14. "A Little Bit More"
15. "Take the Cash (K.A.S.H.) - Live"
16. "I Need a Situation - Live"

== Personnel ==
=== For LP/Disc 1 ===
- Wreckless Eric - vocals, rhythm guitar
- Pete Gosling - lead guitar, electric and acoustic rhythm guitars
- Walter Hacon - electric and acoustic rhythm guitars
- Malcolm Morley - organ, piano, acoustic guitar
- John Brown - electric bass guitar
- Dave Otway (Professor Carnage) - drums, percussion.
