= Tales of the Crystals =

Tales of the Crystals is an interactive children's fantasy role playing game, aimed mostly towards young girls (ages 8 and up). It was published in 1993 by Milton Bradley Company.

The game contains an audio cassette that gives the players certain tasks to do to guide them through four different adventures. There are also cards that list various tasks as well. The game also contains a few props to add to the excitement of the game such as "magic" crystals and a journal that the players can use to write about their adventures.

The game requires the players to co-operate and interact together. It is required of the players to act, recite, and perform tasks. As opposed to remaining seated and inactive during gameplay, players must move around their physical environment and are encouraged to use their imagination to recreate a fantasy world around them.
