= Hungry Hungry Hippos =

Children's tabletop game

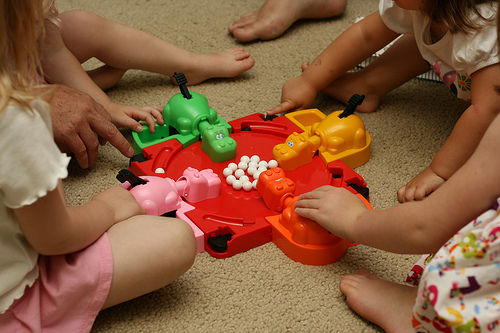
- The game being played by four children
- Other names: Hungry Hippos
- Publishers: Milton Bradley; Hasbro
- Publication: 1978; 48 years ago
- Players: 2–4
- Playing time: 10'
- Chance: Medium
- Age range: 4+
- Skills: Dexterity

Hungry Hungry Hippos (or Hungry Hippos in some UK editions) is a tabletop game made for 2–4 players, produced by Hasbro, under the brand of its subsidiary, Milton Bradley. The idea for the game was published in 1967 by toy inventor Fred Kroll and it was introduced in 1978. The objective is for each player to collect as many marbles as possible with their toy hippopotamus model. The game was, at one point, marketed under the "Elefun and Friends" banner, along with Elefun, Mouse Trap and Gator Golf.

== Gameplay ==
The game board is surrounded by four colorful plastic mechanical hippopotami operated by levers on their backs. When the lever is pressed, the hippo opens its mouth and extends its head forwards on a telescopic neck. When the lever is released, the head comes down and retracts. Plastic marbles are dispensed into the board by each player, and the players repeatedly press the lever on their hippo to make it "eat" the marbles, which travel under the hippo into a small scoring area for each player. Once all marbles are captured, the player who collected the most is the winner.

== Advertising ==
The original late-'70s and '80s television advertisements for the game featured a memorable jingle:

If you wanna win the game you've gotta take good aim
And get the most marbles with your hippo
Playin' Hungry Hungry Hippos
Hungry Hungry Hippos

The 1990s-era advertisements featured a series of brightly colored cartoon hippos dancing in a conga line and singing, "Hungry Hungry Hip-pos!" to the beat:

Hungry, hungry hippos
We're hungry, hungry hippos
We love to feed our face
We're hungry hungry hippos
We're in an eating race

In 2009, the song in the commercial was the "Elefun and Friends" theme song.

== Video games ==
In 1991, Innovative Concepts in Entertainment (ICE) created a redemption arcade version of the game, a supersized resemblance of the board game version. The amount of marbles consumed was displayed at the top of the dome for each player. The more marbles a hippo consumed, the more tickets that hippo's player received.

The previous year, Sinclair User published a game called "Piggy Punks", written by Hellenic Software for the ZX Spectrum, which was inspired by the board game. The game showed an overhead view of a board with four pigs, each controlled by a separate player, in place of the four hippos.

== Film adaptation ==
In 2012, film studio Emmett/Furla Films announced that they were working on an animated film adaptation of Hungry Hungry Hippos, along with Monopoly and Action Man. The movie's plot and other details were being kept secret. Production was originally scheduled to start in early 2016, but the film entered development hell.

== Tournaments ==
Rogue Judges, a volunteer judging group at Gen Con, ran a "1st Annual Hungry Hungry Hippos World Championship" in August 2015 and have continued to hold one every year since at the Indiana Convention Center.

A Hungry Hungry Hippos Tournament was also hosted at Smash the Record 2017.

== In popular culture ==
The game has been referenced in The Simpsons (1992), Mystery Science Theater 3000, Donnie Darko (2001), Toy Story 3 (2010), My Little Pony: The Movie (2017), Agents of S.H.I.E.L.D. (2018)The Last Man on Earth (2017), Safe Havens (2018), Schitt's Creek, Space Force (2020), The Afterparty (2022), Monday Night Football (7 October 2024), and Zootopia 2 (2025). There is also a battle level based on the game in the 2016 Micro Machines game. Mike Ehrmantraut loses a round of the game against his granddaughter, Kaylee, in Breaking Bad.
