= Gambler (board game) =

1975 board game by Parker Brothers

- The Gambler game box (1977 edition)
- Publishers: Parker Brothers
- Publication: 1975
- Years active: 1975 - 1983
- Players: 2 to 4
- Chance: High (dice rolling)
- Age range: 10 and up

Gambler was a board game originally made by Parker Brothers in 1975.

A redesigned version of the game was released in 1977. The game is now out of print, and the US trademark on the game was cancelled in 1983.

== Game ==
Source: Gambler official rules

The game consists of players taking turns rolling dice to move around the game board. Each player starts with $100 of in-game money. The object of the game is to be the first player to win $1,000 of in-game money.

Events giving players a chance to win money can happen when a player lands on a space, draws cards, or rolls doubles.

A roll of doubles give the option for the roller to call a Sweepstakes or the roller may attempt a second roll of doubles. The Sweepstakes uses a special "Dice Shaker", a device containing six dice with an area to shuffle the dice and a narrow handle that holds each of the dice in a line. All players make some type of bet and then a player shakes the Dice Shaker and moves the dice into the handle. The order of the dice in the handle determines which (if any) player wins the sweepstakes.

It is possible that multiple players could cross $1000 simultaneously, particularly in a sweepstakes. If this happens, the winner is whoever has the most money.

A player may borrow money from the bank if he runs out of money. He or she receives an IOU. The IOU may be paid off during the game. A player with an IOU cannot win the game. If a player runs out of money while in possession of an IOU, he or she is eliminated.

=== 1975 edition ===
- There is a jackpot, which starts at $100 at the start of the game. The jackpot can grow and shrink as the game progresses. One square called "slot spot" wins the jackpot. If the jackpot is won this way, it is reset to $100 by the banker.
- A second roll of doubles in the same turn is a $100 bonus.
- Sweepstakes payouts are determined by the size of the jackpot at the time of the sweepstakes and payouts are multiples of the jackpot.
- The Sweepstakes bets include six number position (highest dice wins), four split positions and five poker combination positions.
- There is a deck of Bank cards. Bank cards may be lottery tickets, "wild ivories" (extra dice that a player can add in a sweepstakes), a series of "good news or bad news" cards, and a series of "lucky you" cards.
- There are "raffle tickets", which can be purchased if the player lands on a "buy raffle ticket" square. The cost is a multiple of a die roll and cashed when the holder reaches a "charity bazaar" square.
- There is a "kitty" which receives proceeds from raffle ticket sales. There is also a "lucky boxcars" square where everyone adds $20 to the kitty. The Kitty is won when a player rolls a 12. If the Kitty has no money when a 12 is rolled, the player wins no money. The Kitty can also be won on a "lucky you" Bank card.
- An IOU is taken out with $100. An IOU is paid off when the holder gets his or her next win. Half of the winnings is returned to the bank to pay off the IOU.
- The 1975 edition serves up to six players.

=== 1977 edition ===
- The 1977 edition does not have a jackpot or kitty. The board is only 24 squares compared to 32 squares in the 1975 edition. There is a jackpot square on the board that wins the player $50.
- This edition serves up to four players.
- The bank cards are replaced by fortune cards.
- Raffle tickets are replaced by lottery tickets. These lottery tickets can be purchased at the start of any turn.
- There is also a horse race. The entry fee is $20. There are six horse race cards, each with a die roll. The player landing on the horse race deals these cards and then rolls a die. The player holding the number rolled wins $80. There can be horse races where nobody wins.
- An IOU is taken with a $200 loan and is paid back at the option of the player at $200 plus $20 in interest.
- The sweepstakes payouts are explicitly on the board with six number positions and four split positions. There is a pair position that pays out if the same number is in two consecutive dice in the shaker. There is also a straight position where a sequence of three numbers in order must be in three consecutive adjacent dice.
- The sweepstakes has an entry fee of $10.
- In addition to sweepstakes, the dice shaker is used in lottery drawing. In the 1975 version the shaker is only used in a sweepstakes.
- The bonus for a second doubles in the same turn is $500.
- $100 is awarded to a player each time he or she passes Start.
