= NakNak =

Collectible toys by Hasbro

NakNak was a collectable toy line manufactured by Hasbro from early 2001 to late 2003. They were "stacking battle action figures" that clicked when their arms or legs were moved. In addition to solely collecting the toys, players were also able to play a game of stacking them without the figures falling over. It was heralded as the "first ever stacking battle action figure brand".

They were given away in McDonald's Happy Meals in 2003.

Different NakNak figures were categorized by "Cliks" based on the types of hands and feet they had (blocks, toes or hooks), as well as their aesthetic.

Name	Arms	Legs	Number of figures
Tribanaks	Hook	Hook	8
Camo-Naks	Toes	Hook	7
Humanaks	Hook	Toes	8
Alienaks	Hook	Block	9
Artznaks	Toes	Block	9
Robonaks	Block	Block	9
Maginaks	Toes	Hook	9
Graffitinaks	Toes	Block	7
Basenaks	Hook	Toes	5
Dominaks	Block	Block	5
Creepnaks*	Hook	Block	7
Hairynaks*	Hook	Block	2
Fisherman-naks	Hook	Block	3
Hasbro-nak	Hook	Block	1
Today Show Nak	?	?	1

*These Cliks are a different make and quality than the official, original figures.

There was one special figure that could exist within any Clik and was thus named the "Chameleon-nak". It was a holographic figure and was only available by purchasing the first playset produced by Hasbro labeled as the "NakNak Wave Rocker Play-set".

Two Graffitinaks out of the 7 in the known Clik were only available by purchase of the second playset known as the "NakNak Ultimate Play-set".

A third playset was also available called the "NakNak Case Play-set" that could hold up to 30 figures. Five random figures were also included in the purchase of the playset.

Aside from the established Cliks, there are several significant subgroups of Naknak figures.

Stunt Stackers- There were 8 figures in this subgroup. It was a compilation of various figures from other Cliks, but given very special gear that could often be used in stacking competitions. Some examples of the gear were a bike helmet, a unicycle, a scooter, gloves and various others. The only way to use a Stunt Stacker in a competition is if the Nakitude and Stacking die were rolled into the "Ground" and "Wild" positions twice. Holographics- There were 3 holographic figures within this subgroup. Only one could be used in any stacking competition, and you must declare whether you want to use one or not. If used, you could pose it in any way on the central stack or on the ground touching the stack, without rolling the dice.

Promo-Naks- This subgroup includes figures from promotional events, some of which are very difficult to find today. There are 14 known Promo-naks. Three of these were available by mail order from Gorton's of Gloucester while two others were specially made called the "Hasbro-Nak" and the "Today Show nak". The Hasbro-Nak has the Hasbro logo on its belly while the Today Show nak represented the Today Show logo imprinted on its belly. McDonald's and Great Clips both had their own representative figures as well, which had slight differences compared to the retail ones manufactured by Hasbro. The retail Hasbro figures had the same design on both sides of each figures's body. The McDonald's "Creepnaks" and the Great Clips "Hairynaks", as they were referred to, had no stickers on the back side so that included stickers could be applied. The Creepnaks and Hairynaks had similar body and head designs to their Hasbro counterparts, but the heads clicked when swiveled around and the arms and legs were hollowed out. There were 7 figures made by McDonald's. Happy Meal Toys #1 and #2 each came with two figures (one unique figure each) and no accessories, while the other five had some accessories included with them such as alien heads, alien feet, a small stacking pyramid and a carrying case that could hold 5 figures. There were 2 figures put out by Great Clips as part of a back to school promotion from July to August 2003.

It is arguable that Promo-naks are their own "Clik". On one hand, all known Promo-naks have hook arms and block legs, which is characteristic of a cohesive "Clik". However, Hairynaks and Creepnaks seem to contradict this by specifically defining themselves as unique cliks.

Clown-naks and Basket-naks- Clown-naks and Basket-naks would have been two new Naknak cliks. Their gimmick is that they have different proportions than standard figures. While they were never released, they were announced to be "coming soon" in pamphlets that came with later Naknak boosters.
