= Hi Ho! Cherry-O =

Children's board game

- Cover of the original edition by Whitman, 1960
- Other names: "Let's Pick Cherries"; Apple Harvest
- Designers: Lorraine Landfried; Hermann Wernhard
- Illustrators: Katrin Lindley; Hermann Wernhard
- Publishers: Whitman Publishers; Milton Bradley; Hasbro
- Publication: 1960; 66 years ago
- Years active: 1960–present
- Genres: Put and take board game
- Languages: English
- Players: 2–4
- Playing time: 10'
- Age range: 3+
- Skills: Counting

Hi Ho! Cherry-O is a children's put and take board game currently published by Hasbro in which two to four players spin a spinner in an attempt to collect cherries. The original version called "Let's Pick Cherries" was created by an elementary school teacher named Lorraine Landfried from Door County Wisconsin. She sold her design and rule set to Whitman Publishing in 1959 for $400.00 and 12 copies of their version of the game after it was published. Designer Hermannn Wernhard and artist Katrin Lindley adapted the game into Hi-Ho! Cherry-O which was produced by Whitman Publishing in 1960. In 1987, there was a video cassette version, made by Golden Book Video in the hi-ho video line, this involved a character, farmer Bing, asking for your help to collect cherries. During an update in 2007, the rules were updated to include a cooperative play variant, where players cooperate to remove all fruit from the board before a bird puzzle is completed. In 2015, Winning Moves Games USA published a classic edition.

== Gameplay ==
Each player starts the game with an empty basket and 10 cherries on their tree. Players take turns spinning the spinner and performing the indicated action. The spinner is divided into seven sections:

1. Take one cherry off of the tree.
2. Take two cherries off of the tree.
3. Take three cherries off of the tree.
4. Take four cherries off of the tree.
5. Dog: Replace cherries on the tree: two if the player has at least that many, or one if they have only one. If the player's bucket is empty, this space has no effect.
6. Bird: Same effect as the dog.
7. Spilled basket: Return all cherries to the tree. If the player's bucket is empty, this space has no effect.

The first player to collect all the cherries from their tree and call "Hi Ho! Cherry-O" wins the game.

== Analysis ==
The game length for a single player can be determined using a Markov chain, yielding the following results:.

- Minimum game length: 3
- Average game length: 15.8 (Exact: 494813746 / 31313403)
- Maximum game length: Unbounded
- 25th percentile: 7 moves
- 50th percentile (median): 12 moves
- 75th percentile: 21 moves
- 95th percentile: 40 moves

The game length for multiple players depends on the number of players as they all compete who would be first to finish. The average number of rounds for 2,3,4 players until someone wins is 9.6, 7.5, 6.4; with median number of rounds being 8, 6, 6. That is, for 2 players half the time it will take 8 rounds or less for someone to win, with average number of rounds being 9.6.
