= P-O-X =

2001 handheld electronic game

Front side of a P-O-X unit.

P-O-X is a handheld electronic game released by Hasbro in 2001. The game focuses on creating and customizing creatures called "POX Infectors" and using them to battle against other POX Infectors. The game includes both single-player and multi-player modes and a 30-foot (9 m) wireless connection range.

P-O-X was introduced through a viral marketing scheme. Hasbro asked kids in Chicago schools, "playgrounds, skate parks and video arcades" who they thought the "coolest kid" was, until they found kids who felt they were "the coolest" themselves, and distributed free copies of the game to them.

P-O-X performed strongly enough in the Chicago market to convince executives of the major toy retailer Toys R' Us to come on board for a national launch, slated for September 23, 2001, planned to coincide with the start of the Christmas shopping season. Originally, a second phase of the launch had been planned for 9 additional cities in the United States beyond Chicago, but the launch schedule was pushed forward due to the strong support from Hasbro and Toys R' Us executives.

In a case of unfortunate timing, the terrorist attacks of 9/11 and subsequent 2001 anthrax attacks raised considerable doubts in the Toys R' Us executive team about the viability of launching a game that prominently featured Earth being attacked by malicious forces that took the form of bug-like viruses that 'infected' their targets. After some focus groups with parents indicated that they [the parents] were uncomfortable with their children playing a game that featured viruses and 'infection', the game was pulled from the market.

There are three different versions of the game, each released as a differently colored console: the red Spino, green Cycro, and blue Plasmo.

== Gameplay ==
Playing the game would require players to either use the wireless function to battle those around them, or use the single-player Arena. Arena gameplay consists of traveling around a sort of maze and fighting different P-O-X along the way . At the end of every mazelike level was a container with a new body part in it, and guarding that is the boss, called an Overspore. Upon victory against the Overspore, the player gains possession of the body part. However, the Overspore has as much HP for each body part as the player's infector has in its "healthiest" body part, making the battle difficult. Each level was named for the body part it contained at its end.
