= Avalanche Peak =

Avalanche Peak may refer to:

- Avalanche Peak (California)
- Avalanche Peak (Colorado)
- Avalanche Peak (India)
- Avalanche Peak (New Mexico)
- Avalanche Peak (New Zealand)
- Avalanche Peak (Wyoming)
- Avalanche Peak (Yukon)

== See also ==
- Avalanche Mountain
