= The Lord of the Rings: Journey to Rivendell =

- Developer: Parker Brothers
- Publisher: Parker Brothers
- Designer: Mark Lesser
- Platforms: Atari 2600, Atari 8-bit
- Release: Cancelled
- Genre: Action
- Mode: Single-player

The Lord of the Rings: Journey to Rivendell was a video game scheduled to be released in the winter of 1983. Parker Brothers was set to publish it, and advertised it in their 1982 and 1983 catalogues as a game that would be released on the Atari 2600 and Atari 8-bit computers. The game was originally advertised under the name Lord of the Rings, and in one case as The Lord of the Rings I. It was described as an adventure of getting Frodo Baggins from the Shire to the door at Moria, a description which was later changed in the 1983 Parker Brothers Video Games catalogue to have Rivendell as the adventures end point instead. The same catalogue was first time the game was ever referred to as The Lord of the Rings: Journey to Rivendell, and was the last advertisement the game ever received. The game was never released, and it was believed that little or no work was done on the game's coding.

Almost twenty years after Journey to Rivendell was first announced, in the weeks leading up to the much anticipated release of the first live-action movie, a former Parker Brothers employee gave a prototype of the game to the operator of the AtariAge website. Surprisingly, the game was quite complex and seemed to be complete.

An Atari 2600 cartridge was donated to The Strong National Museum of Play where it was digitized for guests and researchers to access.

== Gameplay ==
Screenshot from the prototype. Frodo is at centre, and Sauron's spy bird flying overhead from the left.

The game's objective is to travel as Frodo to Rivendell as he bears the One Ring on his journey. The game begins in the Shire, in the village of Hobbiton; pulling up the map reveals the player's location in Middle-earth, as well as the other settlements of Bree and Rivendell, all indicated by "+" marks on the map. Loudwater river serves as a barrier into Rivendell, and can only be crossed by one of two bridges. There is also a road that allows Frodo to move faster when walking along it.

While traveling to Rivendell, Frodo must avoid any of the nine Black Riders (also known as the Nazgûl) who are hunting him. A tone sounds when the Nazgûl are nearby, growing louder the closer they become. Once a Nazgûl is close enough, the area around Frodo will darken, and a low rumbling noise will sound if a Nazgûl is on screen. The road will also allow the Nazgûl to move faster when they ride on it, making it unviable for escape if Frodo is being pursued. If Frodo is caught by any of the Black Riders, he will be sent backwards from Rivendell and will be wounded. The player can occasionally wander into a forested region, indicated by lack of a visible character sprite (represented instead by a blinking rectangle), where the Nazgûl cannot follow Frodo; however, if Frodo lingers in a forest region too long, he will be wounded. If Frodo is wounded three times, or fails to reach Rivendell within seven days, the game ends.

As time passes in-game, the Nazgûl become faster and harder for Frodo to avoid, especially at night when they cannot be outrun. A dark bird (a spy from Mordor) will periodically fly overhead; if it passes over Frodo, the Nazgûl will immediately be alerted to his location, with the closest one heading in the direction where the bird saw him. Holding down the fire button will make Frodo put on the One Ring, causing him to become invisible. Wearing the Ring prevents the bird from seeing Frodo as it passes, and can partially obscure him from nearby Nazgûl just off-screen, but increases the speed of the Nazgûl the longer it is worn.

The passage of time in each day can be determined in-game by the color of the sky, seen at the top of the screen, as follows: purple for sunrise, blue for day, orange for sunset, dark blue for twilight, and black for night. The map screen will also show how many days have passed, as well as how many wounds Frodo has; it's important to note that pulling up the map screen does not stop the passage of time (though can prevent Frodo from being wounded in a forest).

Frodo can receive helpful bonuses, such as faster movement and shielding from a wound, by exploring and finding other characters from The Lord of the Rings. The other characters in the game are assumed to be Fellowship of the Ring members: Sam Gamgee, Aragorn/Strider, Gandalf the Grey, Tom Bombadil, and Glorfindel; however, due to the low resolution of the Atari 2600 and the lack of an official reference manual, the identities of some of the game characters are debated by players. The game's Glorfindel and Tom Bombadil characters are often interpreted as Legolas and Gimli respectively.

A second prototype of the game, labeled "WIP .17", was eventually discovered. There are less than ten bytes of data distinguishing the WIP .17 prototype from the first prototype, which itself was labeled "LOTR". The LOTR prototype is believed to be the more finalized version of the two. The two versions, upon reaching Rivendell, play different victory tunes from each other. The tune is noted as sounding distinctly worse in the WIP .17 prototype. In the WIP .17 prototype the Nazgûl are faster with the left difficulty switch set to B. However, the player receives a point bonus for playing with the switch set to A. In the LOTR prototype A is the harder difficulty with faster Nazgûl, and receives the appropriate point bonus.
