= Lords of Shadow (disambiguation) =

Lords of Shadow can refer to the following:

- Lord of the Shadows, eleventh book in the Vampire Destiny trilogy, part of the larger The Saga of Darren Shan series, written by the author Darren Shan
- Castlevania: Lords of Shadow, a 2010 video game
- Castlevania: Lords of Shadow – Mirror of Fate, a 2013 video game
- Castlevania: Lords of Shadow 2, a 2014 video game
- Lord of Shadows, a 2017 novel by Cassandra Clare
