= Captains of Industry (band) =

British music group

The Captains of Industry were a British group, formed by former Stiff Records performer Wreckless Eric. The group was managed by the Clash's former road manager, Johnny Green.

In 1985, the group released an album, A Roomful of Monkeys on Go! Discs Records. Shortly after the release of the album they broke up, after the band lost most of its original members.

== Discography ==
=== Albums ===
- A Roomful of Monkeys (Go! Discs #AGO LP5) (1985)
  - "Land of the Faint at Heart"
  - "Our Neck of the Woods"
  - "Julie Home & Away"
  - "The Lucky Ones"
  - "Reputation (A Serious Case of A)"
  - "Food Factory"
  - "Lifeline"
  - "Lady of the Manor"
  - "Playtime Is Over"

=== Singles ===
- "Lifeline" b/w "Girl in a Million" (co-written with Syd Geary)
