= Avalanche Lake =

Avalanche Lake main refer to:

- Avalanche Lake (Ooty, Tamil Nadu, India)
- Avalanche Lake (Flathead County, Montana), a lake in Glacier National Park
- Avalanche Lake, a lake in Stillwater County, Montana
- Avalanche Lake (New York), a lake in the Adirondack Mountains
- Avalanche Lake (Washington) in the Alpine Lakes Wilderness
