= The Wonderful World of Wreckless Eric =

Studio album by Wreckless Eric
- Released: 1978
- Studio: Britannia Row Studios, London
- Genre: Rock
- Label: Stiff
- Producer: Pete Solley

Wreckless Eric chronology
Wreckless Eric (1978)	The Wonderful World of Wreckless Eric (1978)	Big Smash! (1980)

Professional ratings
Review scores
Source	Rating
AllMusic	4/5 stars
The Encyclopedia of Popular Music	3/5 stars

The Wonderful World of Wreckless Eric is the second album by the English musician Wreckless Eric. It was released on October 13, 1978, as black vinyl LP (SEEZ 9), green vinyl LP (SEEZ 9), and picture disc LP (SEEZP 9).

== Production ==
The album was produced by Pete Solley.

== Album cover ==
The cover features Eric and others wearing Lloyd Johnson suits, including then-NME journalist Danny Baker at the drum kit.

== Critical reception ==
Trouser Press wrote that "a balance is struck between Eric's innate looseness and the clarity and sheer musicality needed to adequately present his tunes. As a result, The Wonderful World is a rollicking good time, propelled by Eric’s trademark guitar chug." Dave Thompson called the songs "stronger" than those on the debut, acknowledging that "a more polished sound and delivery left [the album] feeling less immediate." The Rough Guide to Rock wrote that the album develops Eric's "patent hybrid of punk and pop with a 50s sensibility."

== Track listing ==
All compositions by Wreckless Eric; except where indicated
Side 1

1. "Walking On The Surface of the Moon"
2. "Take The Cash"
3. "Dizzy" (Freddy Weller, Tommy Roe)
4. "Veronica"
5. "Roll Over Rock-Ola"

Side 2

1. "I Wish It Would Rain"
2. "The Final Taxi"
3. "Let's Go to the Pictures"
4. "Girlfriend"
5. "Crying, Waiting, Hoping" (Buddy Holly)

== Personnel ==
- Wreckless Eric - vocals
- Malcolm Morley - electric & acoustic guitar
- Eunan Brady - electric guitar
- John Brown - electric bass guitar
- Geir Waade - drums
- Pete Solley - keyboards, producer

with:

- Jo Partridge - electric guitar solos on "Dizzy", "Veronica", "Roll Over Rock-Ola" and "I Wish It Would Rain"; Spanish guitar solo on "Crying, Waiting, Hoping"
- Dick Hanson, John Earle - brass on "Dizzy"
- Choir of The Latter Day Church of Non-Believers - choir on "Dizzy" and "The Final Taxi"
- Gary Taylor - bass voice choir on "Crying, Waiting, Hoping"
