= Wreckless Eric (album) =

Studio album by Wreckless Eric
- Released: 31 March 1978
- Recorded: 1977–78
- Studio: Pathway Studios (listed on sleeve as Bar Snack Studios)
- Genre: Pub rock; power pop; punk rock
- Length: 38:31
- Label: Stiff
- Producer: Larry Wallis; Nick Lowe

Wreckless Eric chronology
Wreckless Eric (1978)	The Wonderful World of Wreckless Eric (1978)

Professional ratings
Review scores
Source	Rating
AllMusic	4.5/5 stars
Record Collector	4/5 stars

Wreckless Eric is the debut album by the English musician Wreckless Eric, released on 31 March 1978. It reached number 46 on the UK Albums Chart.

== Release ==
A 10" version of the LP was issued on both brown and purple vinyl in the United Kingdom. These versions omitted the tracks "Whole Wide World" and "Telephoning Home". The full-length version of the LP was also issued on green vinyl in Germany.

It was reissued on CD for a limited time in 1994 by Disky Communications and included three bonus tracks: the "Whole Wide World" single B-side "Semaphore Signals" and two versions of Devo's "Be Stiff", a song that many artists on the Stiff Records label had covered as a promotional vehicle.

According to Eric's website, most versions of Wreckless Eric feature speeded-up versions of the tracks, in which the songs are a semitone higher than recorded. Some of these versions have also appeared on various compilations throughout the years.

In a 1995 interview with Peter Doggett (found on the limited edition Rykodisc release An Overview Disc), former Stiff Records labelmate Elvis Costello mentions that, due to their unusual vocal styles, Stiff had originally envisioned a split LP between himself and Eric, with each artist taking one side of the record.

== Reception ==
Trouser Press said, "Led by producer, labelmate and ex-Pink Fairy Larry Wallis, a motley crew slosh together some mangy guitars, slurpy sax and cheesy organ to surround the strangled, semi-sodden vocals of this lovable scruffy runt from Brighton."

== Track listing ==
All songs written by Wreckless Eric, except where noted.

1. "Reconnez Cherie" – 3:15
2. "Rags and Tatters" – 1:28
3. "Waxworks" – 2:46
4. "Telephoning Home" – 3:59
5. "Grown Ups" – 2:54
6. "Whole Wide World" – 2:52
7. "Rough Kids" (Ian Dury, Russell Hardy) – 2:02
8. "Personal Hygiene" – 2:42
9. "Brain Thieves" – 3:48
10. "There Isn't Anything Else" – 2:35

1994 reissue bonus tracks

11. "Semaphore Signals" – 2:57
12. "Be Stiff" (version 1) (Gerald Casale, Bob Lewis) – 3:35
13. "Be Stiff" (version 2) (Casale, Lewis) – 3:35

== Personnel ==
- Wreckless Eric – vocals, guitars, drums
- Barry Payne – bass guitar
- Charlie Hart – Vox organ; accordion on "Reconnez Cherie", Farfisa organ on "Telephoning Home", piano on "Rough Kids"
- David Lutton – drums
- Davey Payne – alto saxophone, tenor saxophone

Additional musicians

- Steve Currie – bass guitar on "Telephoning Home"
- John Glyn – tenor saxophone on "Telephoning Home"
- Nick Lowe – bass guitar and guitars on "Whole Wide World"
- Steve Goulding – drums on "Whole Wide World"
- Larry Wallis – guitar on "There Isn't Anything Else"
- The Lillettes – backing vocals on "Personal Hygiene"

Production

- Larry Wallis – production
- Nick Lowe – production on Whole Wide World
- Chas Herington – engineering, recording

== Charts ==
Chart (1978)	Peak position
UK Albums (Official Charts)	46
