= Crocodile Dentist =

Children's game

- Crocodile Dentist Travel Version
- Designers: Robert B. Fuhrer
- Publishers: Winning Moves Games USA (present)
- Publication: 1990; 36 years ago
- Players: 2+
- Age range: 4 or older

Crocodile Dentist is a game made for young children, first published by Milton Bradley in 1990. A smaller travel version of the game was released in 1993 and is currently being produced by Winning Moves. The game was conceived by Robert B. Fuhrer, who later created Gator Golf, and many other toys and games.

== Gameplay ==
The goal of the game is to press down on the plastic teeth from a crocodile toy's mouth. Earlier versions required the player to instead remove the tooth with a pair of pliers; this was changed to avoid having small loose parts to make the game more accessible to younger children. If the "sore tooth" is pressed or removed, the mouth will snap shut and lunge toward whoever pulled the sore tooth, and the person who caused the mouth to shut is the loser. The mechanism of pushing the tooth down was initially only used in the travel version, which lacks the ability to lunge, but was later incorporated into the full-sized version of the game.

== Development ==
Crocodile Dentist went through several changes during its development phase. Fuhrer and his technicians were told to tweak the length and speed of the crocodile's lunging motion so that the toy would not cause eye injuries. Fuhrer also added a pair of plastic pliers to quell fears that children would hurt their fingers. However, the game testers later thought that the toy lacked excitement, and though the pliers remained in the final product, Fuhrer restored the original lunging motion.

== Reception ==
Crocodile Dentist was one of the best-selling games of the 1991 Christmas season and remained a high-seller afterwards.

Several commentators listed the product as one of the strangest new toys available. "What kind of mind came up with this game?" asked the York Daily Record's Mike Argento, who included it in his 1992 Bizarre Toy Awards. Twelve years later, however, Argento admitted that the game had "passed into classic status".

The success of Crocodile Dentist led Robert Fuhrer to design several other crocodile-themed games. One of those, Crocodile Golf, became the popular Gator Golf.

== In popular culture ==
A 1993 episode of The Price Is Right featured a blooper involving the travel version of Crocodile Dentist. The game was used as one of the small prizes in the pricing game Pathfinder, and host Bob Barker and model Janice Pennington decided to try it out. Barker triggered the sore tooth, which caused the crocodile's jaw to close on his finger and Barker to yelp in pain.

In episode ten of Men Behaving Badly, the main characters are seen playing the game with Dorothy's ten-year-old nephew.
