= Elefun =

Children's game created by Hasbro

- Designers: Omri Rothschild; Boaz Coster
- Publishers: Hasbro (1993-2020s); Goliath Games (2026-present)
- Publication: 1993; 33 years ago
- Years active: 1993–present
- Genres: Children's game
- Languages: English
- Players: 2-4
- Age range: 3+

Elefun is a 1993 children's game from Hasbro. Players use a net to catch butterflies from a plastic elephant's 1-metre-long (3.3 ft) trunk, a plastic chute through which the paper butterflies travel, propelled up by a motor in the elephant. The game was republished twice between 2003 and 2009, starting with the marketing under its "Elefun and Friends" name. This consists of Hungry Hungry Hippos, Mouse Trap, Chasing Cheeky, and Gator Golf.

A 2008 direct-to-video short film adaptation was released exclusively as Elefun and Friends: A Tangled Tale. The film was directed by Darrell Van Citters in production of Renegade Animation with songs composed by Jared Faber.

In 2010, it made an appearance as the daily prize in the season 5 episode 14 episode of Fetch! With Ruff Ruffman.

Playskool, a subsidiary of Hasbro, created the spin-offs as the "Elefun Busy Ball Popper" in 2011. A golden butterfly was added to the game in 2012. There is also a female version called Belefun.

In August 2025, Goliath Games announced it had acquired worldwide manufacturing and distribution rights to the game from Hasbro. The company will relaunch the game with a new look in Fall 2026.

== About ==
Elefun was designed by Omri Rothschild & Boaz Coster in 1993. It is suggested to be played between 2 and 4 players and takes approximately 10 minutes to play.

== Details ==
Elefun is a children's game suggested to be played by preschoolers ages 3–6. The motorized elephant blows nylon butterflies into the air and all the players try and catch them in their nets. Players can also grab the butterflies off the ground to collect them in their net. The player who collects the most butterflies once the elephant is done blowing them earns a butterfly token on their net. Also, the player who catches the special blue butterfly wins a token. The first player to collect three butterfly tokens wins the game.

== Versions ==
Musical Freddy and His Flying Fish is the same game as Elefun, but instead of an elephant that blows butterflies, there is a large fish that blows out smaller fish. There is also a Winnie the Pooh version called Pooh's Blustery Day.

== Advertising ==
The original commercial for this game featured a jingle sung to the tune of "The Arkansas Traveler".

== Publishers ==
Elefun was published by the following:

- Hasbro
- Hilco Corporation
- Milton Bradley
- Parker Brothers
- Playskool (Elefun Busy Ball Popper)
