= Whole Wide World (song) =

- 1977 UK issue

Single by Wreckless Eric

from the album Wreckless Eric
- B-side: "Semaphore Signals"
- Released: 25 August 1977
- Recorded: 1977
- Genre: Rock
- Length: 3:02
- Label: Stiff
- Songwriter: Eric Goulden
- Producers: Nick Lowe; Ian Dury

Wreckless Eric singles chronology
"Whole Wide World" (1977)	"Reconnez Cherie" (1978)

"Whole Wide World" is a song by English rock singer-songwriter Wreckless Eric, who wrote the song in May 1974, and recorded it in 1977, whilst an original member of the Stiff Records label. Additional musicians on the record were Nick Lowe on guitar and bass, and Steve Goulding on drums.

The song was never a hit single for Eric, though it subsequently became his best-known recording. The only charted versions of "Whole Wide World" are a cover by the Australian band Mental As Anything, who took it to No. 53 on the Australian singles chart in 1995, and another by the American alternative rock band Cage the Elephant, who took it to No. 11 on the Billboard Alternative Songs chart in 2017.

== Sung by Wreckless Eric ==
- 1977 on the compilation album A Bunch of Stiff Records
- 1978 on the self-titled Wreckless Eric album, track 6
- 1979 on That Summer film soundtrack
- 1979 on the compilation album The Whole Wide World, track 1
- 1980 on Big Smash! album, side 3, track 1 (double LP) or CD 2, track 1 (2-CD set)
- 2001 on Greatest Stiffs album, track 1
- 2002 on the Me Without You soundtrack, track 14
- 2006 on Stranger than Fiction soundtrack, track 3
- 2006 on "Whole Wide World 4 England" single, track 1

== Covers by other artists ==
- 1977: Elvis Costello and the Attractions on the Stiffs Live Tour. Wreckless Eric later said, "I wasn't a fan of Elvis Costello, particularly."
- 2020: Green Day frontman Billie Joe Armstrong covered the song for Amazon Music's Amazon Original series, then later re-posted the cover to Green Day's YouTube channel as part of his "No Fun Mondays" cover series. Wreckless Eric himself gave his approval of the cover in a statement, referring to Armstrong's rendition as "the most punk rock version ever."
