= Monster Face =

Toy set

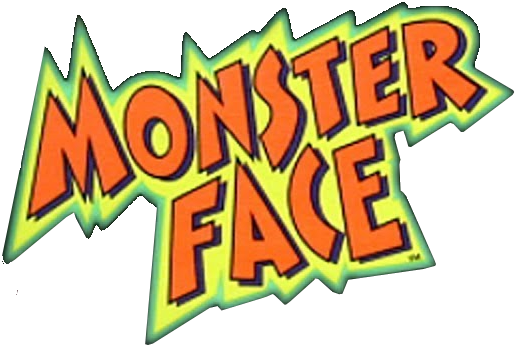
- Company: Hasbro
- Country: USA
- Availability: 1992–?
- Materials: Plastic, slime

Monster Face was a toy set launched by Hasbro in 1992, in the style of Mr. Potato Head. The toy consisted of a skull-like head with holes to which several accessories such as bugs, fangs, noses and blisters could be attached, to create a new monster based in altering the original face. The toy came with green slime that could drip out of the face's nose and mouth.

The toy had 30 different accessories, and a mannequin-sized monster head attached to a base that could also store the pieces. Part of the appeal of the toy was also the possibility of animating the monster by moving his eyes and jaw which was achieved by moving two small arm-like sticks in the base; it also had a small air pump to inflate the attachable blisters in the center of the base.
