= Lavalas =

Lavalas, the Haitian Creole word for "avalanche", may refer to:

- The Lavalas Political Organization in Haiti, founded in 1991 by Jean-Bertrand Aristide and his supporters, later part of the Struggling People's Party
- Fanmi Lavalas, a political party in Haiti, formed in 1996 by Aristide and his supporters
