= Challenge The Yankees =

Board game

Challenge The Yankees was a popular baseball board game, sold only in 1964 and 1965 by Hasbro (Hassenfeld Bros.) of Pawtucket, Rhode Island.

== Gameplay ==
The game consists of 25 New York Yankees player cards, 25 All Star player cards (non-Yankees), a baseball diamond game board, cards representing different plays (single, double, triple, fly ball, ground ball) 4 pegs to move around the bases, manager strategy cards, and other accessories. The player up at bat rolls the dice, and refers to that "batter's" card, to check to see what that dice roll represents for that particular ball player, and moves a pegs accordingly. Each player's card is different, for example, a dice roll of 3 when Yogi Berra is at bat represents a home run, while a 3 rolled for Bill Mazeroski represents a base on balls. The object is to score the most runs at the end of 9 innings.

The 50 player cards in the set are approximately 4" × 5½", with a blank back, and feature a small black & white photo of the player, a facsimile autograph, and a few biographical details and stats. The only way to distinguish the cards between the two years is to compare the stats. There has been some confusion over the years about the 50 player cards in the 1964 set, and the 50 in the 1965 set. Some players are the same in both editions, and some are different.

== Development ==
Challenge The Yankees was created to profit on the reputation and popularity of the New York Yankees, to face the best players in the league at the time as worthy challengers. Roger Franklin was attending classes at New York University when he thought of the idea that would become Challenge the Yankees, and developed them game with his later Phi Lambda Delta fraternity brother Allen Finkelson, when they talked about it while playing in an Island Park, New York summer baseball league in summer 1949. The game was published by Hassenfield Bros.

== Collectors ==
Collectors like to be certain which year player card they are buying. Below is the complete listing of 1964 and 1965 cards. The ERA for pitchers and batting averages for the position players are noted in order to distinguish between 1964 and 1965. Only four of the 100 cards are identical for the two years: Yankees Hector Lopez and Tom Metcalf, and All Stars Carl Yastrzemski and Johnny Podres. Every other card differs in some small way, either by player fact, ERA or Batting Average.

== 1964 Set ==
Position Player's Batting Ave or Pitcher's ERA

Player name	ERA/batting averages
Hank Aaron	.320
Yogi Berra	.285
Johnny Blanchard	.247
Jim Bouton	3.04
Clete Boyer	.243
Marshall Bridges	3.75
Harry Bright	.255
Tom Cheney	3.67
Del Crandall	.257
Al Downing	2.81
Whitey Ford	2.78
Tito Francona	.278
Jake Gibbs	.250
Pedro Gonzalez	.192
Dick Groat	.293
Steve Hamilton	3.47
Elston Howard	.286
Al Kaline	.309
Tony Kubek	.275
Phil Linz	.276
Hector Lopez	.272
Art Mahaffey	3.81
Frank Malzone	.280
Mickey Mantle	.309
Juan Marichal	3.07
Roger Maris	.261
Eddie Mathews	.280
Bill Mazeroski	.264
Ken McBride	3.54
Willie McCovey	.282
Tom Metcalf	2.77
Jim O'Toole	3.52
Milt Pappas	3.42
Joe Pepitone	.265
Ron Perranoski	2.33
Johnny Podres	3.63
Dick Radatz	2.13
Hal Reniff	2.78
Bobby Richardson	.272
Rich Rollins	.302
Ron Santo	.266
Bill Skowron	.289
Duke Snider	.298
Bill Stafford	3.55
Ralph Terry	3.52
Tom Tresh	.278
Pete Ward	.290
Carl Warwick	.256
Stan Williams	3.74
Carl Yastrzemski	.294

== 1965 Set ==
Player name	ERA/batting averages
Hank Aaron	.320
Johnny Blanchard	.248
Jim Bouton	3.03
Clete Boyer	.239
Leon Carmel	.219
Joe Christopher	.266
Vic Davalillo	.279
Al Downing	3.18
Whitey Ford	2.73
Bill Freehan	.281
Jim Gentile	.266
Jake Gibbs	.214
Pedro Gonzalez	.261
Dick Groat	.293
Steve Hamilton	3.42
Elston Howard	.289
Al Kaline	.307
Tony Kubek	.270
Phil Linz	.262
Don Lock	.251
Hector Lopez	.272
Art Mahaffey	3.93
Frank Malzone	.278
Mickey Mantle	.309
Juan Marichal	2.93
Roger Maris	.263
Eddie Mathews	.277
Bill Mazeroski	.264
Ken McBride	4.14
Tim McCarver	.281
Willie McCovey	.271
Tom Metcalf	2.77
Pete Mikkelsen	3.56
Jim O'Toole	3.37
Milt Pappas	3.34
Joe Pepitone	.258
Ron Perranoski	2.55
Johnny Podres	3.63
Dick Radatz	2.20
Pedro Ramos	4.07
Hal Reniff	2.87
Bobby Richardson	.271
Rich Rollins	.291
Ron Santo	.276
Rollie Sheldon	4.18
Bill Stafford	3.46
Mel Stottlemyre	2.06
Tom Tresh	.268
Pete Ward	.286
Carl Yastrzemski	.294

== Notes for 1965 cards where Pitcher's ERA or Player's Batting Average are the same as in the 1964 set ==
Mickey Mantle - All Star Years Listed; Hank Aaron - 64 All Star noted; Dick Grote - 64 All Star noted; Bill Mazeroski - 64 All Star noted; Johnny Podres - Same Card 64/65; Carl Yastrzemski - Same Card 64/65; Héctor López - Same Card 64/65; Tom Metcalf - Same Card 64/65.

Also note that some of the 1965 cards have single digit numbers or letters in the top right or left hand corner of the card.

== 1965 Yankee Rollie Sheldon Card ==
Not all of the 1965 sets contain the NYY Rollie Sheldon card. Rollie was traded to Kansas City on May 3, 1965 and his card was withdrawn from the set, making it more scarce than the others.
