= Nebula 19 =

Cover art of 2nd edition, 1977

Nebula 19 is a science fiction board wargame published by the Mishler Company in 1971.

== Gameplay ==
Nebula 19 is a two-player wargame of interstellar starship combat that takes place in a starcluster consisting of 15 stars and seven large nebulae. In addition to using traditional two-dimensional X- and Y-axis coordinates on a hex map to track unit location, players also add a Z-axis coordinate indicating the unit's altitude above the map to simulate a three-dimensional combat system. Each player makes their moves on a separate map in order to make hidden movements. At the end of each movement phase, the players compare their relative positions and engage in combat if ships are within range.

There are three levels of play:

- Basic
- Standard: Adds tracking (ship type and strength is not revealed until probed), and hyperspace movement
- Advanced: Adds supply points, and player ship design

Several scenarios are provided, including a four-player combat — which requires an extra set of maps for the two extra players — and a naval fleet combat in which several players can be divided between two forces.

== Publication history ==
The game was designed by Harry Mishler, with artwork by Mike Gilbert, Dave Haugh, and Dana Lombardy, and was published by Mishler Company in 1971. Mishler published a revised second edition in 1977.

== Reception ==
Tony Watson reviewed Nebula 19 in The Space Gamer No. 45, and was not impressed, saying, "Gamers seeking an interesting game of interstellar warfare would be wasting their money on Nebula 19, especially when games such as Stellar Conquest, Starforce, and Star Fall are available."

== Other reviews ==
- The S&T Guide to Conflict Simulation Games, Periodicals and Publications in Print, Issue 2, p. 8
