= Make-A-Million =

Card game

Make-a-Million is a card game created by Parker Brothers. It was copyrighted in 1934 and released to the public in 1935. The game was first released in Salem, Massachusetts, and then to New York City, San Francisco, Chicago, and Atlanta.

The original game was designed for four players, with a three-player option with a dummy hand. Later, Parker Brothers adapted the game to accommodate six or eight players. The game enjoyed popularity through the 1930s into the 1950s. Major printings occurred in 1934, 1935, and 1945, with the last printing from Parker Brothers in 1957. The card style was modified slightly with each printing.

In 2004, Packard Technologies purchased the trademark for the Make-a-Million card game. The company printed over 17,000 decks of the original 1934 design and called it the "70 Year Anniversary Edition". Packard Technologies now sells the game as a two-deck game for four to eight players.

== Rules of the game ==
=== Objective ===
The objective of each side is to capture tricks in which Money cards have been played. The side to first score a million dollars wins. The privilege of naming trump color and getting the "widow" goes to the highest bidder. If the highest bidder and partner do not earn at least their bid, they are "set-back" the amount of their bid. The other partnership gets the amount equal to the sum of the Money cards they captured. The Bull and Bear cards play a key role. If the Bull is played it doubles the value for the partners who capture that trick. But if a Bear is played it cancels any value in that trick. The Tiger is the highest trump. The deck contains fifty-five cards. The cards consist of the Tiger (highest trump), the Bull (which doubles the value of the trick on which it is played), the Bear (which cancels the trick it is played on), and four suits of colors-red, yellow, black, and green, which rank in the following order of capturing power: $40,000, $30,000, $15,000, 11, $10,000, 9, 8, 7, $5,000, 4, 3, 2, 1. (There is no 6 card.) Money cards display a Dollar Sign ($).

=== Dealing ===
After each hand, the deal passes to the left. The dealer distributes the entire pack, randomly placing three cards aside to form the "widow". The widow goes to the highest bidder, who also names the trump color.

=== Bidding ===
Players bid for the privilege of choosing trump color. Bidding begins at $175,000 to $200,000, and the highest bid is usually from $220,000 to $260,000. Thus, following a starting bid of $175,000 (commonly expressed by saying "one seventy-five"), bids such as $190,000, $200,000, $210,000, $225,0000, $235,000 are proper.

The highest possible score for one hand is $400,000 plus what the Bull may double, and minus what the Bear may cancel. The player to the left of the dealer begins the bid. The bid then continues clockwise, and each player must make a bid or pass. Each subsequent bid must be at least $10,000 higher than the previous. This process continues until everybody except one player has passed.

=== Highest bidder and the widow ===
The highest bidder takes into his hand the widow of three cards. He may retain any or all of these in his hand, and then must discard three unwanted cards in their place. He must not discard a Money card unless there are no other non-Money cards to discard—in which case he must show the Money cards he discards to other players. He must never discard the Bull, Bear, and Tiger. The highest bidder then announces the color of trumps. Generally, no one but the highest bidder sees the widow cards, though a unanimous vote of the players can change this. This may give the "bidding team" or "setting team" or both an advantage.

==== Example ====

A and B are Partners, playing against Y and Z. A, sitting at the left of Dealer, opens by bidding $175,000. Z bids 190. B, who has a poor hand, "passes". Y, who has a strong hand, raises his partner by bidding 200. A then bids 210. Z passes. B has already passed. Y bids 220. A passes and so Y becomes the highest bidder at $220,000. Y, being the highest bidder, now picks up the widow, and after discarding names trump color. Y and Z must then make at least their bid of $220,000 and A and B work together to keep them from making the bid. Partners work together to take as many tricks containing Money cards as possible. If Y and Z make at least $220,000, they get the amount equal to the sum of the Money cards they captured (taking into account the added or subtracted value the Bull and Bear may have given them). A and B get the amount they captured.

=== Playing ===
After the trump color is announced (and the widow removed or set aside), the highest bidder starts the game by playing to the center of the table any card of any color. The play passes to the left, each person playing one card. The highest card of the color led takes the cards thus played, called a trick, unless the trick is trumped, in which case the highest trump played takes the trick.

Note that a player must follow the color led, if possible—that is to say, if the player has a card of the color led, he must play a card of that color. If a player does not have a card of the Color led, he may either "throw away," (i.e., play a card of any other color), or, he may in such case, play a trump, Bull, or Bear, if he has one, or a Money card if he thinks his Partner will capture the trick. Who ever takes a trick places it face-down in front of him or his partner so that all their captured tricks are kept in one group. Tricks containing the Bull or the Bear are kept separate from others. Once a captured trick has been placed in front of the player who captured it, it may not be reviewed until the end of the game. The player taking the trick leads the next trick. Bull or Bear cards cannot be led to a trick unless the player has no other cards left in their hand. Partners must not advise each other what to play.

=== The Bull card ===
The Bull card may be played only when its holder cannot play a card of the color led, or when it is the last card held in a player's hand. It is a very important card because it doubles the value of the count cards in that trick for the side that captures it.

==== Example ====
Suppose A leads a low red card. Z, the opponent at his left, follows with the red $40,000. B, A's partner, unable to capture, plays a low red. Y, Z's partner, holds the Bull, and having no red cards plays the Bull. The trick is, of course, captured by Z and this trick is set aside by Z face up with the Bull on top. The value of this trick, $40,000, when taking the score, is doubled for partners Y and Z counting $80,000.

=== The Bear card ===
The Bear card may be played only when its holder cannot play a card of the color led, or when it is the last card held in a player's hand. It cancels the value of the count cards in that trick for the side that captures it. If the Bull and the Bear are both played upon the same trick, the value of the trick is affected only by whichever is played last. If a player is forced to lead a trick with the Bull or Bear then the player who first follows with a number, Money card, or Tiger establishes the color of that suit.

=== The Tiger card ===
The Tiger card is always the highest trump and is used like any card of the trump color. If led, it calls for the play of trumps. If trumps are led and the player with the Tiger has no other trumps in his hand, he has to play the Tiger.

=== Scoring ===
After all the cards of the hand have been played, each side adds up the score of the captured Money cards. Any Money cards in the trick in which the Bull is played count double, and the trick in which the Bear is played is worthless (subject, of course, to the rule regarding the play of both Bull and Bear in the same trick). If the highest bidder's side has captured cards that total or exceed its bid, it scores all it has earned. If the highest bidder's side has failed to earn at least its bid it is "set back" the total amount of its bid. In other words, having had the privilege of naming trump color, if the highest bidder's side fails to earn its bid, it not only can't score what it earned, but has the bid amount recorded as a negative score (deducted from its current or future earnings). The opposing side, which did not name trump color, retains the total amount it made.

==== Example ====
Suppose Z is the highest bidder at $240,000, and Y-Z (partners) capture a total of $200,000 beside a bull trick that contains $30,000 that is doubled to $60,000. They have "made their bid" and score $260,000. However, if Y-Z's count had been anything less than their bid, they would be set back in their bid. A-B score the total they captured. The game is won by the side that first scores one million dollars. If both sides reach or exceed one million dollars at the end of the same hand, the highest score wins.

=== Other options ===
Subject to the unanimous decision of all players:

- Misdeal: Any player who has $15,000 or less in hand may call for a new deal.
- No trump: The highest bidder may call a No-Trump hand, in which no trump color is assigned. Simply, high card takes. The Tiger can be designated as either highest or lowest card.
- Trump not led until played: A player cannot lead out in Trump unless it has been played on a previous hand.

== Rules for six or eight players ==
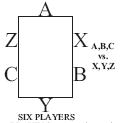

The same rules apply as in standard four player Make-a-Million, but players use combine two Make-a-Million decks. This doubles the possible total score, and the starting and high Bids.

The players remove extra cards not used in play:

- For eight players, they remove three One cards from the decks (i.e., a red One, yellow One, and green One).
- For six players, they remove five number One cards from the decks (i.e., a red One, green One, black One, and both yellow Ones).

=== Playing ===
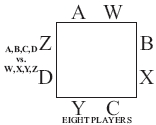

Same rules apply as in standard four player Make-a-Million. Using two decks, there are now two of every card. If two players play the same card on the same trick, and that card would take the trick, the one played last takes the trick.

EXAMPLE (six players): A leads with a Yellow $40,000. X follows with a Yellow $10,000, hoping one of his partners (Y or Z) has the other Yellow $40,000, B cautiously plays a low Yellow card. Y plays the other Yellow $40,000. C plays a low Yellow card. Z plays a Yellow $30,000, Since Y played his Yellow $40,000 after A played his, Y wins the trick. BULL AND BEAR: Same rules apply as in four-player Make-a-Million. If two Bulls are played on the same trick, the count of that trick is quadrupled (unless a bear was played after both Bulls had been played). If a Bull is played, then a Bear, and then another Bull, and a Bear is not played again, the entire trick is reactivated and the count of that trick quadruples. EXAMPLE (eight players): A leads with a Black $40,000. W plays a low Black card. B, out of black, plays the Bull. X, not wanting the opposing team to score and being out of Black, plays Bear. C plays a low Black card. Y, not on the Highest-Bidder's team, plays a Black $30,000 hoping it is canceled. D, out of Black, plays the other Bull. Z plays a low Black card. A wins the trick and the count quadruples ($70,000 x 4 = $280,000).

=== Silent partner ===
Silent partner Make-a-Million should be played with six or eight players. The same rules apply as in six or eight-player Make-a-Million, but partners are not necessarily every other Player.

After trump color is chosen and the Widow discarded, The Highest Bidder selects two (six players) or three (eight players) cards from his own hand and lays them face up on the table. The Bull, Bear, and Tiger must not be selected. The players who have the corresponding cards in their hands become partners of the Highest Bidder. The partners do not immediately reveal their partnership. This happens when they lay one of the cards that the Highest Bidder selected as a partner on a trick. Sometimes a player may have more than one of the partner cards selected by the Highest Bidder. This is the chance the Highest Bidder takes. The Highest Bidder must be careful not to select a partner card that he already holds the duplicate for in his hand.

Scoring: With Silent Partner Make-a-Million, each player keeps his own score. The score received by the team is recorded for each player of that team.

EXAMPLE (six players): A is the Highest Bidder at $480,000 and selects the player(s) holding the Red $40,000 and Green $40,000 as his partner(s). Y holds the Red $40,000 in his hand and is thus a partner with A. After the last trick is played the Highest Bidder counts the total amount captured by him and his partners. The count is $510,000. The amount of $510,000 is recorded for each individual partner of the Highest Bidder.

== Variation ==
For any number of players, the object is to capture tricks in exactly the amount that you bid. To begin, deal an equal number of cards to each player. Do not deal all the cards. After the deal, turn over the top card of the undealt cards. The color of this card is Trump-Color for that game. If the Tiger, Bull, or Bear is on top, turn the next card. After the deal, all players must simultaneously state their bid for the number of tricks they think they will capture. All cards have the same capturing power as in Make-a-Million. Same rules apply as in Make-a-Million. The Play begins with the player left of the dealer. Players must try to capture the exact amount of their bid. With each new deal subtract one card from each players hand. Thus, on the last deal each player has only one card. Scoring: Players who capture exactly the number of tricks that they bid score their bid + five points. Players who capture more or less than their bid score only the number of tricks they captured. The player with the most points after the last game wins.
