= Landslide (board game) =

Board game

Landslide is a board game about the U.S. presidential elections published by Parker Brothers in 1971.

== Description ==
Landslide, a board game for 2–4 players published by Parker Brothers in 1971, uses the mechanics of the United States Electoral College to simulate an American presidential election. The objective of the game is to obtain as many electoral votes as possible by bidding with "currency" representing each player's share of the popular vote.

== Components ==
The game has the following components:

- Gameboard
- 20 Politics cards
- 35 Vote cards
- 51 State cards (includes Washington D.C.)
- 4 tokens
- 1 six-sided die
- 2 card trays
- rules printed on the inner side of the box lid

== Gameplay ==
The game follows the 1970 census, and it correctly represents the electoral college apportionment for each state at that time. For example: New York is apportioned 41 electoral votes, representing its 39 congressmen and two senators.

The board features a circular track in which players move their tokens to land on spaces that have various rewards or triggered game action. The country and states are divided into 4 regions (East, South, Midwest, West) and the circular track is divided into these four sections as well. The player tokens and regions are color coordinated: East = red, South = yellow, Midwest = white, and West = blue. Each player starts on the space called "Home State" in their respective color/region and starts with five vote cards, which range in value from 250,000 to 5,000,000 votes. Players roll a single die to continuously circumnavigate the board, triggering various actions until all 50 states and the District of Columbia (with its three electoral votes) are in the possession of the players.

The various spaces on the board are as follows:

- Home state — the starting point for each player. In addition, when a player passes his/her home state space, he/she earns a vote card while landing exactly on the space earns two cards. If an opposing player lands on another's home state space, he has to allow that player to blindly steal one of his vote cards.
- Votes — landing on this space allows the player to collect a vote card.
- State — landing on this space puts the next state in the pile of state cards up for auction, with the state name and number of electoral votes known only to the player who landed on the space. This is where bidding skills and bluffing come into play. The highest bidder wins that state with the amount of his bid (votes) going to the player who landed on the state space as payment.
- Politics — this allows the player to earn a "politics" card. These cards allow a player to do things like steal a state from another player, stop a game action, steal vote cards, or gamble (in which he pits one of his states against an opponent's state of equal or lesser value; both players roll the dice with the highest roll winning both states).
- Secret Ballot — this space puts the next state from each region up for a blind auction with the winner getting all 4 states.
- Open Ballot — this allows a player to put any of another player's states that he already won back up for auction among all players.
- Fly Anywhere — allows the player who landed on this space to move his token to any space on the board.

== Victory conditions ==
When ownership of the last state has been decided, the player with the most electoral votes is the winner.

== Reception ==
In the March 1989 edition of Games International (Issue #3), Alan R. Moon criticized the game's lack of originality, saying, "Pretty basic stuff here. You could probably find other earlier (and later) games from Parker Brothers with exactly the same play mechanics."

== Other games called Landslide ==
In 2004, Ezakly published a board game, also titled Landslide, that was unrelated to the Parker Brothers game in either appearance or game mechanics, having a Monopoly-style track around the perimeter of the board.

== See also ==
- Landslide victory
