= Avalanche (marble game) =

Board game published in 1966

Original 1966 edition of Avalanche illustrating inclined board and rocking gates.

Avalanche, also marketed as Lawine in the Netherlands, Avalancha in Spain, and Astroslide or Skill in Germany, is an abstract, mechanical strategy game published by Parker Brothers in 1966 that features colored marbles that roll down an inclined board.

== Description ==
Avalanche is a board game for 2–6 players in which they roll marbles down an inclined plastic board, hitting gates that can either "open" or "close". If the marble hits a closed gate, it will stop. If it hits an open gate, it will continue but will change the direction of the gate from left to right or right to left. If a gate that was holding a marble changes direction, the marble will drop down its chute, possibly hitting other gates and potentially starting a chain reaction as those gates release other marbles.

=== Components ===
The game box contains:

- the board, which has a wooden support frame so that it can be inclined
- 60 marbles, divided into three colors
- 6 square cardboard cards with nine punched holes to hold marbles. Each hole has a color corresponding to one of the three marble colors; the holes are colored randomly, with no two cards being alike.
- an instruction sheet

=== Set up ===
The board is set up on an incline, and the gates are randomly set to the right or left. No gate can be left straight up and down. The marbles are separated by color into three trays and left on the table.

Each player receives one square card at random in the basic and standard versions of the game. In the expert versions, each player receives a certain number of marbles instead.

=== Gameplay ===
Avalanche gameplay variant summary
Variant Parameter		Basic	Std	Expert I	Expert II
Starting marbles	Player 1	0	0	11	9 (3×3)
Starting marbles	Other player(s)	0	0	7	9 (3×3)
Cards per player		1	1	0	
Marbles played per turn	Player 1	Until first drop	≤5	Until first drop	
Marbles played per turn	Other player(s)	Until first drop	Until first drop	Until first drop	
End of turn	Marbles retrieved	All dropped	All dropped	All stuck	All dropped
End of turn	Marbles retained	Matching empty spots on card	All retrieved, filling card if possible	All retrieved	
End of turn	Marbles discarded	Leftovers	None	All dropped	None
Objective		Fill card	Fill card, no leftovers	Discard all marbles	≥5 marbles of one color, no leftovers

There are three variants of the game, with slightly different rules for each.

==== Basic game ====
Each player's turn starts by taking one marble of any color from the trays and dropping it into any chute at the top of the board. The player continues to select and drop marbles down the chutes until one or more marbles drop all the way to the bottom of the board. When this happens, the player ends their turn by picking up all the marbles which have dropped. The marbles with colors corresponding to the colored holes on their card are placed on that player's square card (e.g., a green marble in a green hole, etc.), and the others are returned to the tray.

The play then passes to the next player.

Play continues until one player has completely filled their card with nine marbles corresponding to the colors on their card, winning the game.

==== Standard game ====
The first player may play no more than five marbles, and their turn ends either after they have played five marbles, or as soon as one of the marbles reaches the bottom of the board. All subsequent players are not restricted to five marbles, continuing to play until at least one marble reaches the bottom of the board.

At the end of their turn, each player must pick up all the released marbles. Marbles are placed on the player's card according to color. If the player cannot place all the released marbles onto their card, the player retains the extra marbles and must use them on their next turn, instead of returning them to the trays.

The first player to fill up their card with the correct colors of marbles and have no marbles left over is the winner. Because of the no-leftover rule, players who have filled their cards must continue to play if they hold extra marbles, winning only when they can play all the extra marbles without having them drop.

==== Expert rules ====
In Expert Game I, the first player starts with eleven marbles, and all other players with seven marbles. The cards are not used, and the objective is simply to eliminate all their marbles.

On each turn, the player continues to play all their marbles until either one or more marbles falls to the bottom, or they have played all their marbles. In the former case, when marble(s) fall to the bottom, any marbles that fall to the bottom are discarded, while the player takes any marbles left on the board and uses them on their next turn. In the latter case, when the player is able to play all their marbles, they win. The player who gets rid of all of their marbles first is the winner.

In Expert Game II, the players start with three marbles of each color (nine marbles), with the objective to collect at least five marbles of one color without holding any marbles of the different colors. Again, on each turn, the player drops marbles until one or more marbles fall to the bottom. When this happens, the player collects all the marbles which dropped to the bottom of the board. The player who is holding only five marbles of one color at the end of their turn is the winner.

=== Gate mechanics ===
Gate state change mechanics
Initial state Traveling marble		Loaded		Unloaded	
Initial state Traveling marble		L	R	L	R
L	Load / Release	Shunt + Release	Release	Loaded	Unloaded
L	Flip	L→R→L	R→L→R	L×	R→L
R	Load / Release	Release	Shunt + Release	Unloaded	Loaded
R	Flip	L→R→L	R→L→R	L→R	R×

According to the patent, each gate is initially set to the left or the right; when the gate is set to the left, it blocks marble(s) traveling through the lane to the left, allowing passage through the lane on the right and vice versa. A gate is also either loaded (i.e., with a marble being held on top of the gate) or unloaded, so there are four possible states for any gate.

A marble approaching any gate either travels down the lane that is blocked, or the lane that is unblocked. There are four potential outcomes, depending on whether the gate is loaded or unloaded:

- When a marble travels down a blocked lane towards a gate:
  - If the gate is unloaded, the traveling marble stops and loads the gate.
  - If the gate is loaded, the traveling marble is shunted into the unblocked lane. There, the traveling marble will flip the state of the gate as it moves past, releasing the marble loaded on top of the gate. The freed marble then flips the state of the gate back to its original state after it passes.
- When a marble travels down an unblocked lane towards a gate:
  - If the gate is unloaded, the traveling marble flips the state of the gate as it moves past, i.e., the unblocked lane becomes a blocked lane, and the blocked lane is unblocked.
  - If the gate is loaded, the traveling marble flips the state of the gate as it moves past, releasing the marble loaded on top of the gate. The freed marble then flips the state of the gate back to its original state as the freed marble passes the gate.

The shunting action when a marble travels down the blocked lane towards a loaded gate, i.e., when an incoming marble would land on top of a gate that is already loaded, is facilitated by a small recess in the divider wall which allows the loaded marble to remain at rest while the incoming marble is shunted to the unblocked side.

Example 1 showing gate mechanics
		1		2		3		4		5	
Illus.											
Descrip.		Arbitrary starting position; all gates have been set to the left or the right. Assume a marble is dropped through the hole labeled "B", next to the leftmost hole.		As the marble travels down the "B" lane, moving past the upper part of the gate with its pivot at U1, it strikes the bottom part of the gate, causing U1 to flip to the right.		As the marble continues to travel down the "B" lane, it next strikes the bottom part of the V2 gate, causing V2 to flip to the left.		Since the U3 gate is already flipped to the right, its state does not change and U3 stops the marble, which comes to rest on the upper part of that gate.		Dropping another marble down the "A" lane switches the positions of U1, T2, U3, and T4; this second marble ends up at the bottom; because the second marble causes U3 to flip to the left, U3 releases the first marble, which travels down the "B" lane, flipping U3 back to the right. The first marble is then caught by V4.	
U1		L		L→R		R		R		R→L	
T2	V2	L	R	L	R	L	R→L	L	L	L→R	L
U3		R		R		R		R, loaded		R→L→R, released	
T4	V4	L	L	L	L	L	L	L	L	L→R	L, loaded

Example 2 showing gate mechanics
		1		2	
Illus.					
Descrip.		Arbitrary position with one loaded gate at U3. Assume a marble is dropped through the hole labeled "B", next to the leftmost hole.		As the dropped marble travels down the "B" lane, it switches the unloaded gates at U1 and V2. At U3, it is shunted to the "A" lane, where it switches the loaded gate at U3. The freed marble that was loaded at U3 is now released, causing the gate at U3 to switch back to its prior position. The second marble continues down the "A" lane, where it switches gate T4 and then drops to the bottom. The freed marble continues down the "B" lane, coming to rest atop the gate at V4.	
U1		L		L→R	
T2	V2	L	R	L	R→L
U3		R, loaded		R→L→R, dropped marble is shunted and loaded marble is released	
T4	V4	L	L	L→R	L, loaded

== Publication history ==
Avalanche was designed by Frank W. Sinden and published by Parker Brothers in 1965 in North America as well as in Europe. The original design came with 60 glass "cat's eye" marbles in three colors (red, yellow, and blue or green). Each game card uses two of the three colors, with six spots for one color and three spots for the other.

G / R
G	G	R
G	R	G
R	G	G

R / G
R	G	R
R	G	R
R	G	R

G / Y
G	Y	G
G	G	G
Y	G	Y

Y / G
Y	Y	G
Y	G	Y
G	Y	Y

R / Y
R	R	Y
Y	R	R
R	Y	R

Y / R
Y	R	Y
R	R	Y
Y	Y	Y

Leisure Dynamics licensed the game and released it as Avalanche in 1976 under its Lakeside Games label. The Lakeside Avalanche uses 40 plastic marbles in four different colors (red, yellow, green, and blue) and features a fully-enclosed, transparent plastic game board held vertically in a plastic stand. It does not use game cards; instead, the rules for three games are presented, named "Oddball" (players collect every marble that drops out at the end of their turn, with an objective to collect an equal number of each color marble, varying from 4 of each color, i.e., 16 total, for two players; to 2 of each color, i.e., 8 total, for four players), "Hang-Up" (same as "Expert I", except players take the marbles that drop out, not those held on the board), and "Avalanche" (same as "Expert II").

In the early 1990s, Parker Brothers released several editions in various countries in Europe, including the UK (Avalanche, 1991), France (Avalanche, 1992), the Netherlands (Lawine, 1991), Spain (Avalancha, 1992), and Germany (Avalanche). In 2004, the German edition was retitled Astroslide. These early 1990s editions feature a slightly revised game board, which is held upright in a plastic stand, 45 plastic marbles in three colors, and nine-hole game cards with arrows denoting a specific sequence of colors in which the card is to be filled. Each game card has all three colors.

== Reception ==
Arno Steinwender, writing for the Austrian review site Spieletest called Avalanche "a nice action game that's mostly fun for kids. (Adults can easily figure out where the path is clear and blocked.) It's really fun to throw in marbles and see what happens!"

Eric Mortensen, writing for Geeky Hobbies, commented, "If you successfully plan out your moves it is actually quite satisfying to see a lot of marbles that you need fall to the bottom at the same time." He also noted that a combination of strategy and luck was needed to win. Mortensen concluded, "Avalanche is the type of game that is fun in short doses. If played for extended periods of time, I think most people would get bored of the game. I see it more as the type of game that you play a couple of times every so often and then put away for a while."

In A Gamut of Games, Sid Sackson identified Avalanche as a unique game because of its combination of equipment and manner of play, calling it "one of a kind."

In Issue 25 of Albion, game designer Don Turnbull called the design of Avalanche "a basic concept unique in gaming." He commented, "This is a fascinating game, and not at all easy, particularly in the harder version. It is also great fun for the kids, as nothing appeals more to the juvenile mind that to see a great avalanche of marbles hurtling down the board, accompanied by the cheers, or groans, of opponents." Turnbull concluded, "Try it – your family will be amused, and I think you will be intrigued."

=== Awards ===
At the 2004 Spiele der Spiele awards in Vienna, the Wiener Spiele Akademie awarded the German-language edition Astroslide the Spiele Hit für Familien (Best in Class in the category "For Families").

=== Other recognition ===
A copy of Avalanche is held in the collection of the Strong National Museum of Play (object 112.2929).
