= Shadowlord (board game) =

1983 board game

Shadowlord is a board game published by Parker Brothers in 1983. Two to four players, each representing a "master" of one of the four classical elements (air, earth, fire, water) battle each other, and the Shadowlord non-player character, to become master of the universe.

== Gameplay ==
=== Premise ===
The object is to destroy the armies of opponents, and of the shadows, before the timer runs out and the Shadowlord wins.

=== Equipment ===
Various objects required to play the game have a distinct purpose.

- Power Rings: These are the rings that carry the discs in play.
- Character discs: These specify the name and power level of the characters.
- Spaceships: These are required to move, and also to lay claim to galaxies players are not currently in.
- Power cards: These are used in battle, explained later.
- Battlefield: A big blue board where battles (explained later) are held.
- Universe: The board that the game is played on. Each space is a galaxy, and the corner galaxies are "building stations" (explained later).
- Power Stone: An object put into a spaceship slot on the power ring that allows an extra power card to be drawn in battle (explained later). Initially owned by the Shadowlord, it can be won by defeating him in battle. NOTE: In the television commercial for this game, the Power Stone is referred to (by the Shadowlord himself) as the Star-Stone.

=== Legend ===
He ruled the galaxies of the Universe with wisdom and justice ... and by powers the likes of which no man or woman has ever possessed. His name was the Starlord, and his word was Law. When he grew old, the Starlord created a beautiful and mysterious crystal which harnessed his wondrous powers so that they might be preserved for the Starlord’s four children. He called it the Power Stone.

When the Starlord’s death came to pass, into the hands of his nephew the Shadow Master fell the Power Stone. He became the Shadowlord, and a glorious civilization crumbled into darkness and decay.

If this civilization is to flourish again, one of the four remaining heirs must emerge as the Starlord’s successor. Who will it be ... the Earth Master of Taurus, Virgo, and Capricorn? ... The Air Master of Gemini, Libra, and Aquarius? ... The Fire Master of Aries, Leo, and Sagittarius? ... The Water Master of Cancer, Scorpio, and Pisces? Or will the Shadowlord overpower them all?

The four Masters travel the galaxies in search of Warriors, Merchants, and Diplomats. Will the four Masters be powerful enough to defeat opposing alliances in exciting and suspenseful duels? ... Strong enough to withstand attacks from the Shadowlord's mysterious deputies and field commanders? ... Mighty enough to challenge their dark cousin the Shadowlord, whose greatness in battle is a legend within a legend, for ownership of the Power Stone?

The secret to survival is accumulation of power, sabotage of opposing alliances, and the strategic use of one’s resources.

So prepare for an extraordinary adventure among worlds, space-storms, and the Shadowlord’s eerie Lost Fortress ... Where promises last until the next tempting bribe ... Where battles are fierce and defeat is forever.

=== Characters ===
The game is based on five classes characters.

- Star-Masters (Power level: 8) the most powerful and important characters in the game; if a master is killed, that player is out of the game.
  - Human Masters: Air, Earth, Fire, Water
- Warriors (Power level: 6) Warriors are primarily used in battles.
  - Human Warriors: Astrid, Axel, Holger, Kaare, Randi, Sten
  - Alien Warriors: Bernhard (Bear), Viggo (Lizard)
- Merchants (Power level: 3) Merchants are capable of doing battle, but are most useful for building spaceships.
  - Human Merchants: Arne, Brandon, Elayne, Faye, Folke, Selwyn
  - Alien Merchants: Svein (Pig), Vang (Tiger)
- Diplomats (Power level: 0) Diplomats never battle, however they are the only ones who can reveal character discs.
  - Human Diplomats: Aage, Deems, Elfrida, Erling, Ola, Sigurd
  - Alien Diplomats: Bors (Weasel), Gye (Mouse)
- Shadow-Masters (Power levels: vary) antagonists of the game; the Shadowlord begins with the Power Stone plus 5 spaceships.
  - Power Level 10: Invincible Darkness, Shadowlord
  - Power Level 6: Iron Claw, Baron Cruel, Counts Hector and Gwyth, Duke Halifax
  - Power Level 3: Marshalls Racson and Lynx

=== Initial setup ===
The Shadowlord is placed in a black power ring, given one of the power stones and five black spaceships, and placed in the center galaxy. The minor shadows are placed circling the Shadowlord and are given one black spaceship each. A protagonist character disc is placed face down in each of the other galaxies except the home planets of the masters. Each player chooses a master and is given one warrior, one diplomat, and three spaceships which they can distribute to the three members of the force any way they choose. The three allies for each player are placed on the master's home planet.

=== Turn ===
Players roll the die to see who goes first. A turn takes place with the following actions in this exact order.

1. Draw Power Cards: The player draws at least one, and an additional one for every corner galaxy the player controls. The player can either place them underneath a portrait for or face down in their attack hand (for use in battle).

2. Roll the dice and follow the directions of the corresponding number on the guide card rolled.

3. Build spaceships: Players get three spaceships for every merchant they own, three for every corner galaxy they control, and they can discard cards from their attack hand (added to in step one) and redeem it for the corresponding number of ships.

4. Move: Players may move any character with a spaceship in its power ring they like, but may only move as many spaces as that character has spaceships. If they are the first player to cross into a galaxy, they may discard their spaceship onto that galaxy, and they control it. If a diplomat passes into a galaxy that has a face-down character disc, that diplomat may recruit that character into his alliance.

5. Move a minor shadow: Each shadow can only be moved one galaxy at a time, and they never discard their spaceship and own the galaxy. The Shadowlord is never moved.

6. Do battle: Battle occurs when a character moves into another galaxy that another player controls or occupies without his or her permission. Shadows never give permission to cross into the galaxies they occupy.

Battle consists of the following: Each character in the galaxy (or a character of the defenders choice if the galaxy is controlled by the presence of a spaceship) is placed on the battlefield. Each participating combatant may choose one (and only one per character) power card from underneath its portrait or from the generic attack hand. The attacker places this extra card face down, while the defender places it face up. The attacker then turns up his extra card. A power card is drawn from the deck for each character in the battle, with the one controlling a power stone being able to draw yet another power card, and the players total up their side's power levels, spaceship count (only spaceships in the character's power ring count), and the value of all their power cards, and whichever side has the highest total, that player wins the battle. A card is then drawn for each of the losing characters, and that number is how many spaceships they lose. If a character is penalized more spaceships than it has, that character dies and is liquidated from the alliance. If the master dies, that player is out of the game entirely. If a player defeats a character with a power stone (either the Shadowlord or the one who took the power stone from the Shadowlord), that character then takes possession of the power stone. At the end of battle, all cards used are discarded.

If the Shadowlord still holds the power stone, every time the deck of power cards are reshuffled, the power stone timer (which looks exactly like the power stone itself, so it does not matter which one is which) is moved up a slot in the power stone timer base. If the timer reaches the final slot, the game is over and all players lose.
