= Army Ants (toy line) =

1987 toy soldier line from Hasbro

Army Ants is a science fiction toy soldier line from Hasbro in much the same vein as the M.U.S.C.L.E. and Monster in My Pocket lines. It featured an army of humanoid ants.

Released in 1987, Army Ants were originally released in "squadrons" (sets) of three or eight figures, set on card-backed blister packs. The individual soldiers had various themes, including officers, international soldiers (such as French Foreign Legion soldiers and English guards), and aviators (in the form of flying ants).

== Army Ants roster ==
Army Ants were organized into two opposing armies: an Orange Army led by "General Patant" and a Blue Army led by "General Mc-Anther". There were 5 sets for each army: 4 of three figures and 1 of eight figures, which also contained the general for the army.

=== Orange Army ===
- General Patant's Special Strike Force Team
  - General Patant
  - Stalker
  - Snorkel Head
  - Blitz Kreig
  - Rambant
  - Blighty
  - Beau Geste
  - Blak Jak
- Assault Team
  - Mega-Hurtz
  - Road Rash
  - Grease Pit
- Sniper Team
  - Recoil
  - Warpo
  - Repeater
- Bazooka Team
  - Loadout
  - Bug-eye
  - Howler
- Aerial Assault Squad
  - Reeky
  - Windy
  - Bullseye

=== Blue Army ===
- General Mc-Anther's Special Forces Team
  - General Mc-Anther
  - Gimme 50
  - Semper Fi
  - Tail Spin
  - Bone Crusher
  - Knockdown
  - Heave-Ho
  - Jagged Tooth
- Mortar Team
  - Bunko
  - Incoming
  - Quick Hit
- Artillery Team
  - Sneaky
  - Pig Out
  - Ozone
- Flame Thrower Squad
  - Stabber
  - Rip Pin
  - Blow Torch
- Bomber Squad
  - Razor Beak
  - Crossfire
  - Snarl

== Alternate versions ==
Army Ants were also sold in Europe under several names. The most documented online is the Italian version called Kombattini (the French version was called Termitors). Kombattini were marketed by GIG, a toy manufacturer that also produced similar toy soldier lines such as Exogini (the Greek version of M.U.S.C.L.E.), and gained great popularity between the 1980s and 1990s, partially due to a particularly successful advertising campaign. Kombattini used the same 40 molds as Army Ants but with several design differences:

- Figurines were painted a single, solid color with no detailing.
- Red Army soldiers were painted iridescent blue, green, or white.
- Blue Army soldiers were painted iridescent black, pink, or gray.
- Both armies also had rare transparent ants.
- Each model of ant was available in all four colors for its army.
- The ants' rubber abdomens (called "ampolla della forza", "ampules of force") were transparent and glittery.

The toys were also sold differently. Instead of cardboard blister packs, they were available in packages of one, buckets of 4, or pyramids of 8 or 14. As for the English version, each figure had a distinct name, but GIG chose to adopt humorous names mangling those of famous people of the time, including politicians, sportsmen and people from the show business (e.g., "Tromba il bomba" for skier Alberto Tomba, "Van Basta il Tosto" for soccer player Marco van Basten, or "Benigno il Commando" for comedian Roberto Benigni).
