= Wide World =

Board game

- Publishers: Parker Brothers; Waddingtons
- Players: 2–6
- Setup time: 5 minutes
- Playing time: About 30 minutes
- Chance: Medium (dice rolling, card drawing)

Wide World is a board game published by Parker Brothers, a subsidiary of Hasbro. The players are dealt a number of Destination cards. When a destination is visited, the player takes two Product cards, which are either worth 1 or 2 points. The player who visits all of their destinations first then returns home is awarded an extra 5 points, and the player with the most points wins.

To get to their destinations the players roll a die, then move the number of squares shown. The players are not required to land on their destinations exactly (if they are 3 squares away then they can land on their destination if they roll a 5 for example). If a player lands on a red spot on the board, they must take a Travel Agent card and follow the directions printed on it. These cards may move the player around the board, allow them another turn and other actions.

In later versions of the game, a "Weather Vane" was added. It was a plastic sheet which covered a quarter of the board and when a six is rolled it moves, taking any player on it to a different part of the board.

Contents of original game include: Board of World Map, Instructions, 6 Metal plane tokens, 20 Destination cards, 28 Travel Cards, 56 Product cards, and 6 Dice
