= Stay Alive (game) =

Strategy board game

- Box and game
- Publishers: Winning Moves; Milton Bradley (formerly); Hasbro (currently)
- Players: 2 to 4
- Setup time: 2 minutes
- Playing time: 20–30 minutes
- Chance: Medium
- Age range: 8 and up

Stay Alive is a strategy game, where 2-4 players try to keep their marbles from falling through holes in the game board while trying to make their opponents' marbles fall through. It was originally published by Milton Bradley (Currently owned by Hasbro) in 1971 and marketed in television and print advertising as "the ultimate survival game". Stay Alive was republished with a smaller board by Winning Moves Games USA in 2005.

== Gameplay ==
Each player starts the game with a number of marbles in their own color. Players adjust the slides on the board randomly to create a starting board. Starting with a randomly chosen player, players take turns placing their marbles onto the board until all marbles are placed. The start player then chooses a slider and moves it one click either towards or away from the board. Each slider has holes in different locations in it and, as each is moved, the holes can align and allow marbles to fall through. The next player then chooses a slide and moves it, with the one rule that he or she cannot choose the same slide as the player before him or her did. If a player's last marble falls, they are out of the game. The last player with a marble on the board is the winner.
