= Gator Golf =

Children's miniature golf game

- Type: Miniature golf
- Invented by: Robert B. Fuhrer
- Company: Milton Bradley (1994); Goliath Games (2019); Toy City (2020); Hasbro (2023)
- Country: United States
- Availability: 1994–present
- Materials: Plastic

Gator Golf is a children's miniature golfing game. It was released in 1994 by the American game company Milton Bradley (Currently owned by Hasbro). In the game, children take turns putting into the mouth of a motorized plastic alligator figure, which then flings the ball off its tail and spins around, creating a new challenge for the next player. Gator Golf's commercial tag line was "Gator Golf - what could be greater than playing a game of golf with a gator?" It was released again in 2008, then in 2009 under the "Elefun and Friends" banner. It was then re-released in 2019 by Goliath Games.

== History ==
Gator Golf was invented by toymaker Robert B. Fuhrer who had also developed the 1990 game Crocodile Dentist. Fuhrer submitted his idea for Gator Golf (then known as Crocodile Dentist Golf) to Milton Bradley in November 1992. Phil Grant and Mike Meyers of Milton Bradley played a key role in developing the game. Milton Bradley asked him to consider using a different animal in the game, such as a beaver or a dragon, but Fuhrer's original idea remained mostly intact. The game debuted at the 1994 American International Toy Fair, and became one of the most popular children's toys of the 1994 Christmas season.

The game was released again in 2008, without the spins (possibly to keep the game at a lower price than the original) and changing the color from green to orange, but in 2012, the color was turned back to green (though the design of the gator from the 2008 version remained).

The game was released once again in 2019 by Goliath Games. The gator was given a complete redesign, with birds on its back to keep the score.
