= List of Mattel toys =

This list includes all toys produced by the American toy company Mattel.

== A ==
- Agent Zero: 1960s transforming cap gun spy gear (camera to pistol; radio to rifle)
- Aladdin film toy figures
- Aladdin TV series toy figures
- Aaahh!!! Real Monsters
- American Girl
- Angelina Ballerina
- Angelina Ballerina: The Next Steps
- Apples to Apples
- Avatar action figures
- Avatar: The Last Airbender
- Atlantis: The Lost Empire toy figures

== B ==
- Barbie (1959–present) Ken (1961–present) (dolls named after Elliot and Ruth Handler's children)
- Batman
  - Batman Begins
  - The Dark Knight
  - The Dark Knight Rises
  - Batman: The Brave and the Bold
  - Batman v Superman: Dawn of Justice
- Barney & Friends
- The Backyardigans (2005–2009)
- Battle Claw (2017–present)
- Battlestar Galactica (1979)
- Beauty Cuties (2006–2007)
- Big Jim action figure line
- Blaze rocking horse
- Boglins
- Boomco. (2014–present)
- Bravestarr
- Mattel Brick Shop
- Bright Beats
- Bugs Bunny (1962–1964) Talking doll, initial release 26.5 inches tall. Re-issue (1965–1975) 24 inches tall.

== C ==
- Cabbage Patch Kids (1994–2000)
- Captain Kangaroo (1967) Talking doll, voice of Bob Keeshan, TV's Captain Kangaroo.
- Captain Power and the Soldiers of the Future
- Cars
  - Mater's Tall Tales
  - Cars 2
  - Tales from Radiator Springs
  - Planes
  - Planes: Fire and Rescue
  - Cars 3
  - Cars on the Road
- CatDog
- Cecil the Seasick Sea Serpent (1962–1963) Talking doll, companion to Beany Boy. Inspired by the cartoon series.
- Casper the Friendly Ghost (1961–1965) Talking doll, based on the Harvey cartoon of the same name.
- Computer Warriors (1989–1990)
- Construx
- Charmin' Chatty (1963–1964) Talking doll, Mattel's Changeable Record Doll, came with five changeable records.
- Chatty Cathy (1960–1965) Mattel's original talking doll. The pull-string talking mechanism that was created for Chatty Cathy in 1960, and it was used in many Mattel talking dolls from 1960 to 1975. Re-issue new doll (1970–1972) Re-issue '60s version (1998–2001).
- Creatable World (2019–present) Six construction kits for gender-neutral dolls.
- Creepy Crawlers (1964–1966) Set of molds to make bugs, snakes, and spiders from "plasti-goop." The molds and goop are heated in a hot-plate called a "Thingmaker."

== D ==
- DC Universe Classics
- Demolition Man (toys based on Demolition Man)
- Descendants: The Rise of Red (Disney)
- Despicable Me (2020–present)
  - Minions: The Rise of Gru
- Dinosaur (toys based on Dinosaur)
- Dinotrux
- Disney Princess (2000–2015; 2022–present)
- Diva Starz (early 2000s)
- Doctor Dolittle (1967–1968) Talking Doll, inspired by the movie of the same name. Actor Rex Harrison provides voice. Doctor Dolittle See 'N Say also available.
- Doug (1998 to 2000)
- Drowsy (1965–1975) Talking doll, First two years in flannel Kitty PJs, 1967 and after flannel Pink PJs with white dots.
- DC Super Hero Girls (2016–present)
- Dragon Ball Z

== E ==
- Ello Creation System (2002–2004)
- Enchantimals (2017–present)
- Ever After High dolls (2013–2018)
- Extreme Dinosaurs (1997–???)

== F ==
- Fast & Furious
- Fighting Men (1965)
- Fijit Friends
- Fisher-Price
- Flash Gordon (toys based on The New Adventures of Flash Gordon)
- Flavas
- Food Fighters
- Frozen (2013–2015; 2022–present)
  - Frozen Fever
- Furryville

== G ==
- Generator Rex
- Ghostbusters

== H ==
- Halo
- Harry Potter games, etc.
- Hannah Montana (Outside of North America)
- He-Man and the Masters of the Universe
- Hercules toy figures
- High School Musical
- Hi Hi Puffy AmiYumi
- Hot Wheels (1968–present) Die cast small toy cars.
- The Hunchback of Notre Dame toy figures

== J ==
- Jack-in-the-box (1955–present) Musical crank toy in various incarnations.
- Jayce and the Wheeled Warriors
- Jimmy Neutron: Boy Genius (film)
- Jurassic Park (2018–present)
  - Jurassic World: Fallen Kingdom
  - Jurassic World: Camp Cretaceous
  - Jurassic World: Chaos Theory
  - Jurassic World Dominion
  - Jurassic World Rebirth
  - Jurassic World SURVIVAL
- Justice League Unlimited
  - Justice League Action
  - Justice League (film)

== K ==
- Kung Fu Panda
- Kuu Kuu Harajuku

== L ==
- LazyTown (2005–2007)
- Lady Lovely Locks
- Legend Quest
- The Last Action Hero
- Laugh and Learn
- Liddle Kiddles (1966–1972) Tiny 2 1/2-inch dolls, issued in many different series i.e. Storybook, Tea Party, Jewelry.
- Li'l Secrets (1993–1995), doll figures with a treasure hidden in their rooted hair.
- Lil' Gleemerz (2018–present)
- Linus the Lionhearted (1965–1966) Talking Toy, inspired by cartoon character. Talking hand puppet same years.
- The Lion King
- Little Mommy

== M ==
- M.U.S.C.L.E.
- Masters of the Universe action figures
- Magic 8 Ball
- Major Matt Mason (1966–1970) "Mattel's Man in Space", 9 inch astronaut doll figure, space ship etc. available separately.
- Man-Bat
- Mario Kart: Hot Wheels
- Matchbox
- Max Steel
- Mega Man NT Warrior
- Mighty Ducks
- Mindflex
- Minecraft mini-figures
- Monogram models (1970s–1980s)
- Monster High (2010–2018; 2022–present)
- Monsters, Inc.
- Mr. Ed (1964–1965) Talking hand puppet.
- Mulan
- My Child Dolls (1986–1988)
- My Meebas
- My Scene Dolls (2002–2011; 2024)
- Mrs. Beasley (1967–1972) Talking doll, Mattel, as requested, created the doll as a companion toy for Buffy in TVs Family Affair.
- My Mini MixieQ's (2016–present)

== N ==
- Nabi
- Naruto
- Naruto Shippuden
- The New Adventures of He-Man

== O ==
- One Piece
- Onward (film)
- Over The Moon (2020 film) (2020–present)

== P ==
- Plaza Sésamo
- Planet Hot Wheels
- Pixar
- Pixel Chix
- Pocahontas (fashion doll inspired by the 1995 Disney film)
- Polly Pocket
- Poochie
- Popples plush toys
- Pooparoos
- Porky Pig (1965–1966) Talking Toy, inspired by the Warner Bros. cartoon character.
- Power Glove
- Power Wheels
- Prehistoric Pets

== R ==
- Disney-Pixar's Ratatouille
- Recess
- Rescue Heroes
- Rock 'Em Sock 'Em Robots (1964) First Manufactured by Marx Toys.
- Rock 'Em Sock 'Em Robots (2001)

With the little wrenches.

- Robo Wheels
- Rocket Power
- Rocko's Modern Life
- RoseArt
- Rugrats

== S ==
- Sesame Street
- The Secret Saturdays
- Secret Wars (1984–1985)
- See 'n Say (1965–present) Talking toy, Series beginning with the Farmer Says, and the Bee Says, educational talking toys.
- Shaman King
- She-Ra: Princess of Power
- Shogun Warriors (late-1970s)
- Shorties (2004–2005)
- The Simpsons toy figures, games, etc.
- Sing-a-ma-jigs (2010–present) Talking, Singing computer chip toys.
- SpongeBob SquarePants
- Soul
- Strange Change Machine (1968)
- Street Sharks (1994–1996) (See also, Extreme Dinosaurs/Dino Vengers)
- Snub Nose .38 (1958) A small toy revolver that comes with a holster.
- Superman
  - Superman Returns
  - Man of Steel

== T ==
- Tarzan (mid-1970s)
- Tarzan toy figures
- Teen Trends fashion dolls
- Teen Titans Go! (2017–2019)
  - Teen Titans Go! To the Movies
- Toy Story action figures, Little figures (Action Links) with playsets, and dolls
  - Toy Story 2
  - Toy Story 3
  - Toy Story 4
- The Angry Beavers
- The Wild Thornberrys
- Thingmaker (1964–1975) hot-plate device to heat plasti-goop toys such as Creepy Crawlers
- Thomas the Tank Engine
- Tog'l (1968–1970) construction sets
- Tom and Jerry (1965–1966) Talking doll, Inspired by cartoon series. Talking hand puppet issued same years.
- Toss Across Bean-bag tossing game
- Trolls dolls and figures (2023–present)
  - Trolls Band Together
- Turbo
- Turning Mecard
- Tommy Burst (1962) gun with multiple firing abilities

== U ==
- U.B. Funkeys
- Upsy Downsy
- Tyco R/C
- Ukedoodle

== V ==
- Vertibird
- Voltron
- Vs. Rip-Spin Warriors

== W ==
- Wayne Gretzky
- What's Her Face Came with markers to draw expressions on her blank face.
- Wellie Wishers
- Wheel of Fortune Two Home Versions; one in 1988 and one in 1998
- Wish (film)
- Winx Club (2004–2008)
- Wild Grinders
- Wizards of Waverly Place
- Wizzzer (1969–1975) Mattel's string-less tops issued in many color combinations and gift sets.
- Wonder Woman (animated film) 2009 Best Buy only
  - Wonder Woman (2017 film)
  - Wonder Woman 1984
  - Welcome to the Wayne
- WWE (since 2010)
- Woody Woodpecker (1964-1965 re-issued 1972–1974) Talking doll, inspired by cartoon of the same name. Woody talking hand puppet (1964–1965).

== X ==
- Xtractaurs

== Y ==
- Yu-Gi-Oh! (second series anime)
- Yu-Gi-Oh! GX

== Z ==
- Zatch Bell!
- Zorr the Mighty Eagle

== See also ==
- List of Mattel games
