= Whatsername =

Whatsername, Whatshername, or What's-Her-Name may refer to:

== Music ==
- "Whatsername" (Green Day song)
  - Whatsername, a character from the American Idiot musical
- "Whatshername", a song by Peter, Paul, and Mary from Album 1700
- "Whatsername", a song by Deep Purple from Abandon
- "Whatsername", a song by the Suicide Machines from On the Eve of Destruction: 1991–1995

== Other uses ==
- Princess What's-Her-Name, a character in Earthworm Jim

== See also ==
- Hazel Wassername, a character from 30 Rock
- Placeholder name
- What's Her Face (disambiguation)
- What's His Name
- What's My Name? (disambiguation)
