= Robot Chicken season 7 =

Robot Chicken
- Season 7
- DVD cover
- No. of episodes: 20

Release
- Original network: Adult Swim
- Original release: April 13 – December 7, 2014

Season chronology
- ← Previous; Season 6 Next → Season 8

The seventh season of the stop-motion television series Robot Chicken began airing in the United States on Cartoon Network's late night programming block Adult Swim on April 6, 2014, with the episode "DC Comics Special II: Villains in Paradise" and contained a total of 20 episodes. The first of the regular season 7 episodes aired on April 13, 2014.

Most episode titles in the season are mashups of specific media franchises, brands and product names, with the titles for the two specials being the only exceptions.

== Episodes ==
No. overall	No. in season	Title	Directed by	Written by	Original release date	Prod. code	US viewers (millions)
121	1	"G.I. Jogurt"	Zeb Wells	Rachel Bloom, Mikey Day, Mike Fasolo, Seth Green, Matthew Senreich & Zeb Wells	April 13, 2014	701	1.91
Seth and Matthew infiltrate a wild puppet orgy; why God dislikes bees; a drunken visitor from Narnia comes through the wardrobe; the Dino-Riders get a rock song; and Cobra Commander creates his own PSAs to compete with G.I. Joe's. Guest stars: Sebastian Bach, John Oliver, Alia Shawkat Note: The title is a mash-up of the G.I. Joe franchise and the dairy food product yogurt.
122	2	"Link's Sausages"	Zeb Wells	Rachel Bloom, Mikey Day, Mike Fasolo, Seth Green, Matthew Senreich & Zeb Wells	April 20, 2014	702	1.59
The Grim Reaper fights -- and has sex with -- an old woman who doesn't want to die; monsters help a woman fix her car, then go out for ice cream; Edward-209 from Robocop gets lectured by his mom after he shoots an executive; one of the Budweiser Frogs admits he's an alcoholic; Didi yells at Stu for accidentally letting Tommy, Chuckie, Phil, and Lil wander in the streets; Zombie, Hook, Squid, and Lois (from an earlier sketch) get fast and furious; Punky Brewster's "Punky Power" will destroy the world; He-Man causes a noise disturbance at 3:00 in the morning; Clarice Starling keeps getting splattered with Miggs' semen; Jack Skellington celebrates "grown-up" Halloween; Jor-El forgets to pack food and water for Superman before sending him to Earth; Skeletor tries to blow up Snake Mountain after it becomes a mountain climbing attraction. Guest stars: Soleil Moon Frye, Sung Kang, Maisie Williams Note: The title might be a possible mash-up of The Legend of Zelda character Link and a sausage.
123	3	"Secret of the Booze"	Zeb Wells	Rachel Bloom, Mikey Day, Mike Fasolo, Seth Green, Matthew Senreich & Zeb Wells	April 27, 2014	703	1.54
An alien's identity is questioned; Bert gets a new roommate; the Terminator becomes a step-dad; Papa Smurf sees what goes on behind the scenes in Undercover Smurf. Guest star: David Shaughnessy Note: The title is a mash-up of the film Teenage Mutant Ninja Turtles II: The Secret of the Ooze and the alcoholic beverage slang term "booze".
124	4	"Rebel Appliance"	Zeb Wells	Rachel Bloom, Mikey Day, Mike Fasolo, Seth Green, Matthew Senreich & Zeb Wells	May 4, 2014	704	1.56
A dad has an uncomfortable talk with his daughter about the birds and the bees; the origins of bagpipes are revealed; Alex Mack's Carrie-like revenge during her prom fizzles out; and the Nerd dreams of being in Westeros. Guest stars: Larisa Oleynik, Lucy Punch Note: The title is a mash-up of the Rebel Alliance from the Star Wars franchise and an appliance.
125	5	"Legion of Super-Gyros"	Zeb Wells	Rachel Bloom, Mike Fasolo, Seth Green, David Phillips, Matthew Senreich & Zeb Wells	May 11, 2014	705	1.73
The difficulty of choosing between a "Nude Girls" and a "Live Nude Girls" strip club; E.T. prefers M&Ms to Reese's Pieces; raunchy musical numbers on The Planet of the Apes; a World War Z alternate ending; Hannah from Girls guest stars on Sesame Street; another E.T. parody where riding a convertible past the Moon is cooler than riding a bike past the Moon; The Indian Love Boat has arranged marriages and the singer wondering if the sketch is racist; a prequel to The Parent Trap shows its unfortunate implications; a third E.T. parody where E.T. returns home and his disgusted friends make him eat food off the ground; a toy hockey game goes into its third month of overtime; Benjamin Franklin invents bifocals for unsavory reasons; Bruce Wayne fails at keeping his identity a secret; the one cheese Monterey Jack from Chip 'n Dale: Rescue Rangers won't eat; MTV's Catfish reveals the true faces of Dr. Claw, Charlie from Charlie's Angels, and God. Guest stars: Samantha Barks, Megan Boone, Nev Schulman, Catherine Taber Note: The title is a mash-up of the DC Comics superhero team Legion of Super-Heroes and the Greek dish gyros.
126	6	"El Skeletorito"	Zeb Wells	Rachel Bloom, Mike Fasolo, Seth Green, David Phillips, Matthew Senreich & Zeb Wells	May 18, 2014	706	1.61
Street Fighter tackles domestic abuse; Candy Crush Saga becomes the latest game to get adapted to a movie; Woody Woodpecker gets a devastating phone call; reading to your kids before bed is a waste of time; a break-up by the light of the full moon turns into an unexpected marriage on #WerewolfProblems, The Kool Aid Man is used to stop Iran's plans for nuclear warfare, then appears on 60 Minutes with claims that the U.S. Army exploited him; Big Bird lays an egg; Siri can't understand Bane; The Iron Sheik finds his way into Lawrence of Arabia; and Tales From the Crypt’s new tales of terror include a teenage girl summoning The Pervert Unicorn, Bitch Pudding dealing with a haunted house, and George R.R. Martin getting stalked by the Robot Chicken Nerd. Guest stars: The Iron Sheik, George R. R. Martin, Katee Sackhoff, Paul Scheer Note: The title is a mash-up of the Masters of the Universe franchise character Skeletor and the Mexican restaurant El Torito.
127	7	"Snarfer Image"	Zeb Wells	Rachel Bloom, Mike Fasolo, Seth Green, David Phillips, Matthew Senreich & Zeb Wells	May 25, 2014	707	1.67
Voltron's transformation includes a suggestive new addition; a classroom sketch about a teacher who wants to put some realism into what black slavery was like is based on what one of the writers went through in the fifth grade; Superman's Earth father gets humiliated during a tornado; Bones gives the original Star Trek crew prostate exams; what if Sylvia Plath botched her suicide after writing The Bell Jar; why giraffes are hard to execute by hanging; a Pacific Rim parody that shows why linked memories aren't always good; a prequel to the "Failed Giraffe Hanging" sketch; scientists discover a polar bear that has bipolar disorder, lives in Arctic and Antarctic regions, and is bisexual; it's Looper meets Looney Tunes when Elmer Fudd uses time travel to get past TV censorship rules over him having a gun; a kid outs his father's murder plan when he puts a therapy tape into his Teddy Ruxpin; a couple can't decide which famous fictional orphan (Annie, Harry Potter, Pippi Longstocking, Oliver Twist, and Bruce Wayne) to adopt, as they're all terrible; and Skeletor goes back in time to kill He-Man's mother. Guest stars: Ashley Tisdale, Bob Bergen Note: The title is a mash-up of the ThunderCats character Snarf and the retailer Sharper Image.
128	8	"Up, Up, and Buffet"	Zeb Wells	Rachel Bloom, Mike Fasolo, Seth Green, David Phillips, Matthew Senreich & Zeb Wells	June 1, 2014	708	1.65
Scrooge McDuck appears on Shark Tank; Fred Flintstone gets a colonoscopy; Shrek has a moment of clarity; Doc Louis passes on to the great arena in the sky. Guest stars: Gillian Anderson, Kyle Chandler, Heléne Yorke Note: The title is a mash-up of the phrase "up, up and away" and a buffet.
129	9	"Panthropologie"	Zeb Wells	Mikey Day, Mike Fasolo, Seth Green, Brendan Hay, David Phillips, Matthew Senreich & Zeb Wells	June 8, 2014	709	1.78
Master Chief in a compromised position; G.I. Joe gets replaced with unmanned drones; Black Spy performs testicular torture on White Spy. Guest stars: Rob Corddry, Nina Dobrev, Jessica Paré, J. K. Simmons Note: The title is a mash-up of the ThunderCats character Panthro and the retailer Anthropologie.
130	10	"Catdog on a Stick"	Zeb Wells	Mikey Day, Mike Fasolo, Seth Green, Brendan Hay, David Phillips, Matthew Senreich & Zeb Wells	June 15, 2014	710	1.66
Santa Claus is branded a racist due to a Dutch tradition; to clean up his image following his sex scandal, Tiger Woods appears in a low-rent version of Space Jam where the cartoon characters are from DiC; a Game of Thrones wedding turns into a massacre; and the Bratz girls get murdered after they run over Barbie last summer. Guest stars: Sean Bean, Kate Mara, Chris O'Donnell, AnnaSophia Robb, Saoirse Ronan Note: The title is a mash-up of the Nickelodeon animated series CatDog and possibly any skewered food (most particularly the corn dog).
131	11	"Super Guitario Center"	Zeb Wells	Mikey Day, Mike Fasolo, Seth Green, Brendan Hay, David Phillips, Matthew Senreich & Zeb Wells	June 22, 2014	711	1.89
The Boglins' swamp song; the daily life of a lemming; Sleeping Beauty goes on and on about her dream. Guest stars: Bobby Cannavale, Max Greenfield Note: The title is a mash-up of the Super Mario franchise and the musical retailer Guitar Center.
132	12	"Noidstrom Rack"	Zeb Wells	Mikey Day, Mike Fasolo, Seth Green, Brendan Hay, David Phillips & Matthew Senreich & Zeb Wells	June 29, 2014	712	1.39
The Zybots want to join the Autobots; Man-E-Faces experiences stardom; A not-so-quiet shift for the Enterprise night crew. Guest stars: Nat Faxon, Jim Hanks, Val Kilmer, Chris Pine, Patrick Stewart Note: The title is a mash-up of the Domino's Pizza advertising character The Noid and the department store Nordstrom Rack.
133	13	"Stone Cold Steve Cold Stone"	Zeb Wells	Matthew Beans, Rachel Bloom, Mike Fasolo, Seth Green, Brendan Hay, Matthew Senreich & Zeb Wells	July 6, 2014	713	1.91
Why no one plays the piano in Wayne Manor; James Potter's instincts in animal form; Disney Princesses go to war. Guest stars: Keegan-Michael Key, Stephen Merchant, Saoirse Ronan Note: The title is a mash-up of the American former pro-wrestler Stone Cold Steve Austin and the ice cream parlor chain Cold Stone Creamery.
134	14	"Walking Dead Lobster"	Zeb Wells	Matthew Beans, Rachel Bloom, Mike Fasolo, Seth Green, Brendan Hay, Matthew Senreich & Zeb Wells	July 13, 2014	714	1.87
Kim Possible goes on a mission to North Korea, Beanie Babies end up turning a man's life around, and the Nerd becoming companion to Doctor Who. Guest stars: Megan Boone, David Oyelowo, Randall Park, Jordan Peele, Tim Roth Note: The title is a mash-up of the AMC horror series The Walking Dead and the casual dining restaurant chain Red Lobster.
135	15	"Victoria's Secret of NIMH"	Zeb Wells	Matthew Beans, Rachel Bloom, Mike Fasolo, Seth Green, Matthew Senreich, Erik Weiner & Zeb Wells	July 20, 2014	715	2.11
The Count from Sesame Street has a run in with Blade, Jor-El has some very helpful advice for Superman, and a new nemesis comes to Gotham City. Guest stars: Jennifer Carpenter, Jim Hanks, Grey DeLisle, Toby Leonard Moore Note: The title is a mash-up of the clothing retailer Victoria's Secret and the film The Secret of NIMH.
136	16	"Bitch Pudding Special"	Zeb Wells	Tom Root	July 27, 2014	716	2.12
When her fellow citizens in Pastryville get tired of suffering Bitch Pudding's abuse, they hatch a plot to eliminate her once and for all. But Bitch Pudding survives and, upon learning what happened after returning home, exacts revenge on the Pastryville citizens. Guest stars: Katee Sackhoff as Bitch Pudding, Rob Corddry, Kate Mara, Billy Bob Thornton, Billy Dee Williams, Maisie Williams
137	17	"Batman Forever 21"	Zeb Wells	Matthew Beans, Rachel Bloom, Mike Fasolo, Seth Green, Matthew Senreich, Erik Weiner & Zeb Wells	August 3, 2014	717	1.75
Bear Grylls deals with some Wild Things, Dr. Ryan Stone calls a radio station, Brainy Smurf gains a Southern accent and a compromised moral compass as he manipulates events in House of Smurfs, and Baloo discovers he hasn't always just been a bear in the jungle. Guest stars: Calista Flockhart, Ben Schwartz, Skeet Ulrich, Wil Wheaton Note: The title is a possible mash-up of the film Batman Forever and the clothing retailer Forever 21.
138	18	"The Hobbit: There and Bennigan's"	Zeb Wells	Matthew Beans, Rachel Bloom, Mike Fasolo, Seth Green, Brendan Hay, Matthew Senreich & Zeb Wells	August 10, 2014	718	1.71
A woman counts sheep -- and dreams that all of them are being brutalized by a prison guard; Ash and Misty play tennis with Pikachu's Poké Ball; an opera singer goes crowd-surfing; Mr. Fantastic masturbates with a vacuum cleaner at the dinner table; The Bionic Six get picked off one by one; a mourning mother goes crowd-surfing; Albus Dumbledore becomes a meth kingpin after being diagnosed with terminal cancer; Mark Twain is America's First Asshole; a clown makes a balloon animal out of his own feces; a baby goes crowd-surfing; Otis is outed for being transsexual on Back at the Barnyard: Bulls Don't Cry; Cupid is a lousy shot; the reality of war hits the Kitchen Commandos; Pope Francis goes crowd-surfing; to Prince Charming's disgust, Rapunzel's pubic hair is as long as the hair on her head; the embarrassingly dated antics of G.I. Joe Extreme. Guest stars: Nathan Fillion, Maribeth Monroe, Brenda Song, Bex Taylor-Klaus, Skeet Ulrich Note: The title is a mash-up of The Hobbit franchise and the Irish pub-themed restaurant Bennigan's.
139	19	"Chipotle Miserables"	Zeb Wells	Matthew Beans, Rachel Bloom, Mike Fasolo, Seth Green, Brendan Hay, Matthew Senreich & Zeb Wells	August 17, 2014	719	1.72
A boy driving a toy car crashes into a tree and flees the scene of the accident; a risque way to "make the doughnuts" at Bumpin' Donuts; a boy's Bop It sniper rifle forces him to assassinate a politician named Carlton McDougal; Les Misérables is recreated using the mascots from McDonald's; velociraptor dance practice; Flashdance gets merged with You Can't Do That on Television; The Pac-Man family experience paranormal activity in their house; Super Grover gets beat up; the son of the Robot Chicken scientist takes the living U.S. Presidents hostage, and it's up to the Robot Chicken to save them. Guest stars: Zachary Levi, Adrianne Palicki Note: The title is a mash-up of the Mexican restaurant Chipotle Mexican Grill and the musical Les Misérables.
140	20	"Lots of Holidays (But Don't Worry Christmas is Still in There Too So Pull the Stick Out of Your Ass Fox News) Special"	Zeb Wells	Matthew Beans, Rachel Bloom, Mike Fasolo, Seth Green, Matthew Senreich, Erik Weiner & Zeb Wells	December 7, 2014	720	1.62
A celebration of every holiday that has ever existed, featuring a Jewish boy rapping about gelt, a pilgrim surprising his family on the first Thanksgiving, and Santa having trouble with a neighbor.
