= Lie Detector (disambiguation) =

Lie detector is the popular term for a polygraph, a device that measures and records physiological indices, under the belief that these are useful for lie detection.

Lie Detector may also refer to:

- Silent Talker Lie Detector, an alternative to the polygraph, invented between 2000 and 2002
- Lie Detector (TV series), a 2005 show on PAX TV
- Lie Detectors, an American game show
- "Lie Detector" (song), a song by Reverend Horton Heat
- "Lie Detector", a song by the Dead Kennedys from Bedtime for Democracy
- "Lie Detector", a song by Sleeper from The It Girl (album)
- Lie Detector, a 1960 board game originally published by Mattel

== See also ==
- "Lie Detector Test," a song by Bis from The New Transistor Heroes
