= List of Mattel games =

List of games and video games from American toy company Mattel.

== Games ==
- Angry Birds: Knock On Wood
- Apples to Apples (acquired from Out of the box Publishing)
- Atmosfear – The Harbingers
- Barbie
- Bezzerwizzer
- Blink
- Blokus
- Bold
- Boom-O
- Bounce off
- Break the Safe (2003)
- Cinq-O
- Ever After High Charmed Style and Tea Party Dash
- Gas Out
- Ghost Fightin Treasure Hunters
- He-Man: Tappers of Grayskull
- Hot Wheels: Crash!
- KerPlunk (mobile)
- Kuuduk
- Loopz (Includes Loopz Shifter and Loopz M3)
- Lie Detector
- Lowdown
- MAD GAB
- Magic 8 Ball (mobile)
- Monster High Minis Mania
- Othello (Reversi)
- Phase 10
- Pictionary
- The Power Glove for the Nintendo Entertainment System
- Radica USA
- Rhino Rampage
- Rock'em Sock'em Robots (mobile)
- Scene It?
- Skip Bo
- Snappy Dressers
- SnapShouts
- Sonar Sub Hunt (1961–?)
- Spider Pete's Treasure
- Squawk
- Thomas & Friends: Read & Play and Race On!
- Toss Across (mobile)
- Trickster
- Tumblin Monkeys
- Turnspell
- Tyco R/C Racin' Ratz
- U.B. Funkeys (new product with new software to play new games)
- UNO
  - DOS
- UNO Free Fall
- Whac-A-Mole
- Wizards Wanted
- ONO 99

== Video game consoles, home computers and handheld electronic games ==
- Intellivision
- Intellivision II
- Intellivision III (unreleased)
- Intellivision IV (unreleased)
- Aquarius
- HyperScan

== See also ==
- List of Mattel toys
