= Creepy Crawlers (TV series) =

Animated TV series

- Genre: Science fiction Adventure; Comedy
- Based on: "Creepy Crawlers" by Mattel
- Voices of: Steve Bulen; Joey Camen; Cam Clarke; Art Kimbro; Johnny K. Lamb; Heidi Lenhart; Tony Pope; Jan Rabson; O.R. Yarbles
- Music by: Shuki Levy; Kussa Mahchi
- Countries of origin: United States; France
- No. of seasons: 2
- No. of episodes: 23

Production
- Executive producers: Joel Andryc; Eric S. Rollman
- Producer: Sam Ewing
- Running time: 30 minutes
- Production companies: Saban Entertainment; Saban International Paris (seasons 2); Abrams/Gentile Entertainment

Original release
- Network: Syndication
- Release: October 4, 1994 – March 30, 1996

Creepy Crawlers is an animated television series from 1994, produced by Saban Entertainment, that aired in syndication in the United States.

Ownership of the series passed to Disney in 2001 when Disney acquired Fox Kids Worldwide, which also includes Saban Entertainment.

== Premise ==
The show is about Chris Carter, a self-described "normal kid" who is interested in magic. While working at the Magic Shop of bitter discredited stage illusionist Professor Googengrime, Chris designed and built a device he called "The Magic Maker", ostensibly for use in some unspecified magic trick. A particular once-every-thousand-years planetary alignment, the Magical Millennium Moment, rained down cosmic energies on the shop one fateful night, which somehow made the Magic Maker capable of creating strange, man-sized bug/magic trick composite mutant creatures.

The three creatures formed that night, Hocus Locust, Volt Jolt and T-3 (dubbed "Goop-Mandos" by Googengrime), despite looking bizarre, turned out to be friendly, and joined forces with Chris, but Googengrime kept the Magic Maker when Chris and the Goop-Mandos escaped from the shop. Each episode thereafter concerned Googengrime's latest attempt to gain power and conquer the world with a Magic Maker-created "Crime Grime" monster, and Chris and The Goop-Mandos' efforts to stop him, and retrieve the Magic Maker from his evil clutches.

As the series went on, more Goop-Mandos were created. In addition, a young girl named "Sammy" Reynolds became a close ally of the group.

Some sitcom style humor was derived by the concept that the Goop-Mandos were required to recharge after missions by hanging upside-down in the large closet in Chris' room. This concept was derived from a small oozing hourglass-like device housed in the lower torso of each Goop-Mando Action Figure. Although the Carter parents never made an appearance on the show (their voices were heard off-screen in a few episodes), Chris' older brother Todd, a vain and surly "valley dude", was constantly suspicious of the extracurricular goings-on around the house. Furthermore, when the Goop-Mandos needed transportation to a battle site, they would often confiscate Todd's custom dune buggy, using doses of "Goop" to transform it temporarily into the Goozooka "Crawler Cruiser" assault Vehicle. The villains used a similar vehicle called the Bug-Eyed Bomber.

At the Opening of Season Two, Professor Googengrime created a formula, Super Goop, to try to destroy the Goop-Mandos, but it backfired, furthering their mutations. The Goop-Mandos changed colors, gained new abilities and became much stronger.

== Characters ==
=== The Goop-Mandos ===
- Chris Carter (voiced by Joey Camen) – Creator of the Magic Maker. The mysterious Magical Millennium Moment has thrown Chris into a world of magic, monsters and awesome battles as he and his Goop-Mandos must fight Professor Googengrime and his creatures and try and take back the Magic Maker before Professor Googengrime takes over the world.
- Samantha "Sammy" Reynolds (voiced by Heidi Lenhart) – A pretty and headstrong girl, Sammy is one of Chris' closest friends (and possibly his girlfriend). Fit and courageous, she would occasionally save the day, but complain that villains (and occasionally the heroes) would overlook her solely because she is a girl. During an episode when Chris was infected by Goop and began transforming into a human-bug hybrid, he and Sammy went to the school dance together. Chris' older brother Todd is apparently interested in her, which also aided the Goop-Mandos' plots on occasion.
- Volt Jolt (voiced by Jan Rabson) – Created from a floating light bulb and based on a lightning bug, Volt Jolt is one of the three original Goop-Mandos, he always wore a pair of lightning shaped shades. He has electrical powers and can fire electricity to zap the Crime Grimes.
- T-3 (voiced by Johnny K. Lamb) – Short for Tick Trick Tick. Created from a deck of playing cards and based on a tick, T-3 is one of the original Goop-Mandos who is the largest of the group and is their strong man. He is able to fire card-like darts that are shaped like the different suits with amazing speed and accuracy. T-3 must also have had some trace of a "shell game" in his genetic code for the shoulder pads resembling huge walnut shells.
  - T-Flea (voiced by Cam Clarke) - T-3's "little buddy" and based on a flea who he kept within one of his shell-like shoulder pads. He could usually be hiding beneath them.
- Hocus Locust (voiced by Tony Pope) – Created from rope tricks and based on a locust, Hocus Locust is one of the original Goop-Mandos and is the jokester of the group, always having fun, and often lapsing into inane celebrity impersonations. He has rope coiled around his body which he can control to attack or use for many other purposes, he also is the only Goop-Mando to have four arms. After the Goop-Mandos get their upgrade his rope becomes nylon cords with sharp ends.
- Sting Ring (voiced by Art Kimbro) – Born from inter-connecting rings and based on a wasp, Sting Ring was accidentally created when some rings fell into the Magic Maker. At first they mistook him for a Crime Grime but quickly realised he was one of them. He has the power to throw his rings with great power to knock out or cut up enemies. He also could give the group wings which allowed them to fly. After the Goop-Mandos' upgrade his rings are able to do many new things like exploding and many other things.
- Commantis (voiced by Cam Clarke) – Born from kung fu/karate/samurai movie videotapes and based on a mantis, Commantis was created when Spooky accidentally dropped his videotapes into the Magic Maker. Googengrime tried to get him to join him, but after realizing he was evil, Commantis joined up with the Goop-Mandos. Commantis is noble like a samurai and carries two samurai swords on his back which he can use to slice up opponents and is able to throw his voice. After the Goop-Mandos' upgrade he is able to blend into his surroundings.
- T-4 (voiced by Steve Bulen) – In the second season, Googengrime accidentally created T-3's "little brother", T-4, in an attempt to reprogram T-3. The ploy backfired when T-3 fired a few card-darts into a hose connected to the Magic Maker, which turned into T-4. T-4 has four heads and is stronger than T-3, but not as smart.
- Fire Eyes (voiced by O.R. Yarbles) – Born from chili peppers, hot sauce, and based on a firefly. Fire Eyes was created to help combat the ice monster Ice Scream who was created by Googengrime to freeze the city. He is able to shoot heat beams from his eyes, instantly melting stuff.

=== The Crime Grimes ===
- Professor Googengrime (voiced by Steve Bulen) – A failed illusionist who after discovering the Magic Maker decides to try take over the world, he begins to create monsters to help but is constantly stopped by the Goop-Mandos. His first creation and constant companion is Spooky Goopy. His motto is "Make, bake, overtake!" The professor's last name has been spelled in two different ways, depending on the source: "Googengrime" according to elements referencing the TV show, and "Guggengrime", an alternate spelling used by ToyMax in their product literature.
- Spooky Goopy (voiced by Cam Clarke) – Googengrime's right-hand man, a green skeletal lifeform with handcuffs for hands. He is able to use his cuffs for capturing anyone or anything and often serves as a comic relief.
  - Top Hat (voiced by Jan Rabson) - A talking top hat which he is worn by Spooky and usually argues with him.
- Shockaroach (voiced by Heidi Lenhart) – A nasty, cockroach-based monster, Googengrime unleashed swarms of these ravenous pests on the city time and again, only to be thwarted time and again by the Goop-Mandos.
- Squirminator (voiced by Steve Bulen) – Based on a worm, a monstrous creation of Professor Googengrime that is powerful and deadly. His tail has a mace on the end of it and is able to knock the Goop-Mandos out cold, he is also able to utilize his army of squirmy worms which he carries with him at all times. Being grotesque and ugly, he is a challenge for the Goop-Mandos.
  - Super Squirminator (voiced by Steve Bulen) - A second version of Squirminator that was created by Googengrime himself is larger and has a drill on the end of its tail to get goop from the Earth's core. It is programmed to tunnel every time it hears the word "dig".
- Rumble Bee (voiced by Cam Clarke) – A grotesque, crazed bee monster that is near-sighted and the size of a small car.
- 2-Ugly (voiced by Johnny K. Lamb) – A huge, insect-like monster that is able to separate its head from its body, thus causing double trouble wherever it writhes. The original 2-Ugly went awry and tried to destroy Googengrime, but later he created 2-Ugly-2.
  - 2-Ugly 2 (voiced by Johnny K. Lamb) – 2-Ugly's twin brother who is more controllable.
- Bat-Out-Of-Smell (voiced by Heidi Lenhart) – A gigantic bat monster. It can incapacitate most anything with a noxious blast of its horrible "bat-breath".
- The Spider Patrol (voiced by Heidi Lenhart) – An army of brown-haired humanoid spider monsters.
- The Glob (voiced by Heidi Lenhart) - A living blob that grows by consuming anything based on entertainment.
- Frankenfly (voiced by Cam Clarke) – Powered by the same "Super Goop" that gave the heroic Goop-Mandos their new powers at the beginning of a second season, the gargantuan, rampaging Frankenfly combined with hybrid-like components of a flat-headed, bolt-necked Frankenstein stereotype and an ordinary housefly. Oddly, Frankenfly did not fly, but it does feed on raw energy from various electric sources.
- Skrull (voiced Steve Bulen) – A skull-headed robotic machine built from metal components and animated with magic goop. Skrull is not based on an insect and did not come from the Magic Maker, like most other Crime Grimes, but it was created as a replacement for Spooky. Until, it got destroyed by the Goop-Mandos.
- Sergeant Spidey (voiced by O.R. Yarbles) – Googengrime's enforcer in a Summer Camp scam. A bright red militaristic spider who talks like a drill sergeant and is capable of spitting capture webs from his mouth.
- Bugzilla (voiced by Cam Clarke) – A wax figure of a giant rampaging black mantis with laser eyebeams that was brought to life and let loose onto the city leaders for snubbing Googengrime about a magician's award.
- Ice Scream (voiced by Cam Clarke) – A yeti-like monster that can freeze an entire city by screaming.

=== Other Interested Parties ===
- Tom Lockjaw (voiced by Tony Pope) – The lead, but bombastic newscaster for Channel 27 News (a play on the name of Tom Brokaw). He was always on hand to report on the latest monster rampage perpetrated by Googengrime and his Crime Grimes.
- Colonel Ka-Boom (voiced by O.R. Yarbles) – This decorated colonel with the "Pentagon Special Services" was committed to capturing or wiping out the twin menaces of the Goop-Mandos and Crime Grimes, from which he saw as un-patriotic threats in the American Freedom. Although, a few reporters stuck around long enough to ask him questions about his "insane methods".
- Todd Carter (voiced by Cam Clarke) – Chris's older brother.
- Nick Reynolds (voiced by Heidi Lenhart) - Sammy's younger brother.

== Cast ==
- Steve Bulen – Professor Googengrime, Squirminator (in "Sugar Frosted Crawlers"), Super Squirminator (in "All the Way to China"), Skrull (in "A Real Numb Skrull"), T-4 (in "T-4 2")
- Joey Camen – Chris Carter
- Cam Clarke – T-Flea, Spooky Goopy, Todd Carter, Rumble Bee (in "Who's Afraid of Bees?"), Commantis, Frankenfly (in "Dawn of the Super Goop"), Bugzilla (in "Bugzilla"), Ice Scream (in "Cold Snap")
- Art Kimbro – Sting Ring
- Johnny K. Lamb – T-3, 2-Ugly (in "Mauler Amuck"), 2-Ugly 2 (in "Double Trouble")
- Heidi Lenhart – Samantha "Sammy" Reynolds, Nick Reynolds, Shockaroach (in "Power Play"), The Spider Patrol (in "One Creepy Brother"), The Glob (in "The Glob"), Bat-Out-Of-Smell
- Tony Pope – Hocus Locust, Tom Lockjaw
- Jan Rabson – Volt Jolt, Top Hat
- O.R. Yarbles – Colonel Ka-Boom, Sergeant Spidey, Fire Eyes

== Crew ==
- Jamie Simone – Voice Director
- Joel Andryc - Producer/Story Editor
- Peter Kingston - Animation Director

== Origin and development ==
The Creepy Crawlers TV Show was based on ToyMax's Creepy Crawlers Activity toy. A line of 12 action figures were made by ToyMax in conjunction with the show, as well as the Goozooka Assault vehicle. A "Creepy Crawlers Action Figure Playset" was depicted in the 1994 ToyMax toy booklet, but was apparently not produced. Each figure came with a metal mold for use with the Creepy Crawlers toy oven, to make custom accessories for the figure using Plasti-Goop.

The Creepy Crawlers TV show debuted in first-run syndication in the Fall of 1994. The show was produced by Saban Entertainment, known for their Mighty Morphin Power Rangers and other live-action adventure programs. Creepy Crawlers was sponsored heavily by several ToyMax products, including Incredible Edibles and DollyMaker, and other Saban programs such as VR Troopers. The show aired sporadically on weekends through the spring of 1996, airing a total of 23 episodes during its two-year run.

== Episodes ==
=== Season 1 (1994–95) ===
No.	Title	Original release date
1	"The Night of the Creepy Crawlers"	October 4, 1994
The show's pilot introduces Chris, Professor Googengrime, and the Goop-Mandos, and sets events in motion that will affect the show's entire run.
2	"Sugar Frosted Crawlers"	October 11, 1994
Googengrime sets up shop in an abandoned cereal factory, and is soon flooding the market with the only breakfast food containing a living prize inside: Squirminators.
3	"Who's Afraid of Bees?"	October 18, 1994
The Reynolds family moves in next door to the Carters, bringing interesting developments for the new neighbors, and an inadvertent Rumble Bee that is mistaken Sammy for Chris.
4	"Chris Explains It All"	October 25, 1994
Recaps the action of the previous three episodes.
5	"Power Play"	November 1, 1994
A supercharged Shockaroach goes on an electricity-consuming rampage, coinciding with brother Todd's heavy metal "Battle of The Bands" competition.
6	"Vanishing Act"	November 15, 1994
Chris and Sammy's "first date" at the "Razzle & Dazzle" Magic Show, which turns out to be a trap by Googengrime. Meanwhile, across town, the Goop-Mandos literally makes a new friend from the Magic Maker: Sting Ring.
7	"One Creepy Brother"	November 22, 1994
Todd Carter becomes involved in the struggle between Googengrime and Chris. Unfortunately, it is on the wrong side of the conflict, due to Googengrime's newest creations: the Spider Patrol.
8	"I Was a Teenage Crawler"	December 6, 1994
A huge chemical explosion at the pesticide factory leaves Chris slowly mutating into a Goop-Mando with grasshopper-like qualities, just in the middle of his first high school prom.
9	"Mauler Amuck"	December 27, 1994
T-Flea goes missing at a Goop-Mando team training session, while Googengrime loses control of Spooky's first Crime Grime creation: the rampaging 2-Ugly.
10	"The Glob"	January 24, 1995
After accidentally creating Commantis by inserting a Shogun movie into the Magic Maker, Googengrime uses a film festival of horror flicks to produce a writhing gelatinous slime that devours all forms of entertainment.
11	"All The Way to China"	January 31, 1995
The new Super Squirminator tunnels to the Earth's core in search of Magma-Goop, wreaking geological disaster, and leading the heroes on a subterranean chase after Sammy's little brother Nick, who has disappeared down the hole.
12	"Double Trouble"	February 7, 1995
Good and evil agendas clash at the County Museum, as an exhibit of Houdini's Magic Trunk leads to a T-Rex skeleton attack and a high-speed chase on the freeway, as well as 2-Ugly's little brother, 2-Ugly 2.
13	"Attack of the Fifty Foot Googengrime"	February 14, 1995
Googengrime fires Spooky for his perpetual bungling and then, thanks to a lab accident, grows to be 50-feet tall so he can steal the observatory's telescope lens.
14	"Return of the Crime Grimes"	February 21, 1995
In this season closer, Colonel Ka-Boom jails Chris for Goop-Mando conspiracy, Googengrime conquers the city with the unleashed aid of every Crime Grime creature at once, and the Magic Maker is recovered by the side of good, in a colossal final battle that sets everything right... or does it?

=== Season 2 (1995–96) ===
No.	Title	Original release date
15	"Dawn of the Super Goop"	September 16, 1995
Instead of destroying the Goop-Mandos, Googengrime's new weapon augments their powers and color schemes to uncontrollable levels. Now, they must regain their self-confidence without Chris (due to his injury) to stop a "Super Crime Grime", Frankenfly from draining electricity in the city.
16	"Deja Goop"	September 23, 1995
Googengrime dabbles in voodoo, placing Hocus Locust under his power, and at odds with the rest of the Goop-Mandos during a visit to an amusement park.
17	"A Real Numb Skrull"	September 30, 1995
Googengrime builds a better monster and commands the gigantic enforcer, Skrull to destroy his "former" servant, Spooky.
18	"Camp Nightmare"	November 4, 1995
Chris wins a trip to a summer camp in an R/C plane-flying contest, but Googengrime turns up to shake down the rich campers by holding them for ransom.
19	"Bugzilla"	November 11, 1995
Chris and the Goop-Mandos must face Googengrime's latest colossal Crime Grime: the rampaging Bugzilla.
20	"T-4-2"	January 6, 1996
Googengrime plots to gain control of Goop-Mando strongman T-3, but instead winds up creating T-3's younger brother, the four-headed "T-4".
21	"Cold Snap"	January 13, 1996
When Googengrime releases his cold-weather monster "Ice Scream" on the city, Chris and the Goop-Mandos counteracts with the new heat-infused "Fire Eyes" to help them defeat it.
22	"Revenge of the Mutant Stink Bugs"	January 20, 1996
Googengrime creates a swarm of giant stink bugs and unleashes them against the town so the heroes would surrender. Then, Chris, Sammy, and the Goop-Mandos mixes up a chemical formula to eliminate the stink bugs' odor.
23	"The Incredible Shrinking Creepy Crawlers"	March 30, 1996
Googengrime concocts a new miniaturization goop to shrink every building in the city as part of his Monopoly-based scheme, as well as shrinking both Chris and Commantis.

== See also ==
- Creepy Crawlers
