= My Scene: Jammin' in Jamaica =

2004 American film by Mattel

- DVD cover
- Directed by: Eric Fogel
- Written by: Elise Allen
- Produced by: Kallan Kagan
- Edited by: Anthony V. Orkin
- Music by: Julian Harris
- Production company: Curious Pictures
- Distributed by: Mattel Entertainment
- Release date: May 15, 2004
- Running time: 44 minutes
- Country: United States
- Language: English

My Scene: Jammin' in Jamaica is a 2004 American animated comedy film. It is the first My Scene film. It was sold together with the My Scene "Jammin' in Jamaica" dolls. When Madison and Urban Desire go to Jamaica for a contest, Barbie, Nolee and Chelsea raise money to go there too and support their friends, but once there, Barbie is jealous when she catches her boyfriend River spending time with Madison. The film was directed by Eric Fogel, who also directed The Barbie Diaries.

== Plot summary ==
Madison is manager of a band called Urban Desire, which is made up of the four male characters. When the band wins a contest, they make a trip to Jamaica for the finals, but Barbie, Nolee, and Chelsea are left behind so they decide to raise the money to travel to Jamaica. After all the characters arrive in Jamaica, Barbie feels left out as her boyfriend, the lead guitarist, begins spending more time with Madison. This causes a rift between the friends but is eventually resolved.

== Cast ==
- Kelly Sheridan as Barbie and Lexi
- Nicole Bouma as Chelsea
- Tegan Moss as Nolee and Lucy
- Kathleen Barr as Madison and Forture Star Girl
- Meghan Black as Delancey
- Alessandro Juliani as River, Rhys, Ursa, and Treelo
- Shane Meier as Ellis and Baby Bear
- Mark Hildreth as Sutton, Hand, Cold, and Rhys' Dad
- Kirby Morrow as Hudson and Alan
- Nell Innes as Tyson

== Music ==
Urban Desire cover two songs: "Spontaneous Combustion" by The Fuzz, and "Going Down In Flames" by Hidell. Both songs were censored at times to make them more child appropriate for the film. There are also two songs by Leslie Mills in the film, which are "Radiowave" and "Making My Way". "Making My Way" was also in Barbie and the Three Musketeers, which was released in 2009.

== Reception ==
My Scene: Jammin' in Jamaica earned positive reviews from critics.
