= What's Her Face =

What's Her Face may refer to:

- What's Her Face (doll), a line of fashion dolls by Mattel
- What's-Her-Face, a character from "Teen Girl Squad", a comic strip at the website Homestar Runner
- "What's-her-face", a song by Christine and the Queens from Chris
