= My Scene =

Fashion doll series

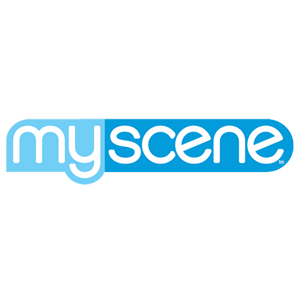
- My Scene official logo
- Type: Fashion doll; Media franchise; Web series; DVD film; Video game; Website
- Company: Mattel
- Country: United States
- Availability: 2002–2011 (G1); 2024–present (Collector)
- Slogan: "My city, my style, my scene." - 2002 "It's a teen scene, it's my scene." - 2003–2005 "Friends setting trends, my scene." - 2005–2007 "My scene, My friends!" - 2008–2011
- Official website

My Scene (stylized in all lowercase) were an American series of fashion dolls first released by Mattel in 2002. They were a spinoff doll line to Mattel’s Barbie doll line and are also considered Barbie-brand dolls. The series was discontinued in the United States in 2008, and worldwide in 2011. In November 2024, collector versions of the three main My Scene characters were released by Mattel, signaling a possible return of the franchise. Mattel's Barbie character was one of the dolls in the toy line. The My Scene dolls' bodies were slim, similar to earlier Barbie dolls, with larger heads. The New York Times described their features as "exaggerated lips and bulging, makeup-caked eyes." My Scene was designed to appeal to the tween market and compete with the Bratz dolls from MGA Entertainment.

== Products and history ==
My Scene dolls Chelsea and Kennedy from the 2007 Foto Fabulous collection

Mattel introduced My Scene dolls in the fall season of 2002 to compete with MGA's Bratz. The series originally consisted of three female characters with diverse ethnicities and personalities; Mattel added more dolls over time. Its three original dolls, Barbie, Madison, and Chelsea, each came with two extra fashions. Except for Barbie, the characters were named after New York City locations. Mattel added more dolls to the series, starting with Nolee and three male characters, Bryant, River, and Hudson, in the year of 2003. Delancey and Ellis also premiered in the "Hanging Out" line, which introduced in late 2003. Kenzie introduced in 2004's "Getting Ready" line, and Nia introduced in the year of 2008. There are seven characters in the My Scene series (Kennedy, Madison, Chelsea, Delancey, Nia, Hudson, and River), six discontinued characters (Barbie, Nolee, Kenzie, Bryant, Ellis, and Sutton) and four special edition dolls (Lindsay, Jai, Tyson and Ryan). Each of the My Scene girls (and three of the boys) own pets.

Female My Scene dolls have a non-twisting, navel-sculpted body mold and share a face mold, developed specifically for the brand, that dons a small nose, wide cheekbones, and large, pouty lips. Some lines' dolls (beginning with "Night on the Town") have rooted eyelashes and glittery eyes. Like the Bratz, these dolls have large shoes that serve as feet, but they also have traditional Barbie feet and can wear regular Barbie shoes. Male dolls also feature My Scene-exclusive face molds; their body molds originated with previous male dolls.

In 2004, Mattel produced new smiling face molds for both male and female characters, which were present for only a short while on the female dolls, whereas male dolls featured these molds until early 2005. Beginning with the "Club Birthday" line, the My Scene dolls' face molds changed to non-smiling molds that more closely resembled the "Bratz Boyz" line of dolls.

In late 2005, Mattel released a My Scene line called "My Bling Bling", which introduced a new eye screening that looked more sultry compared to previous releases. Later, in mid-2006, Barbie was dropped from the line in favor of a new character named Kennedy, who would be introduced in the "Fab Faces" line.

Beginning with the "Swappin' Styles" line of 2006, Mattel produced two more new face molds for female dolls—one with a half-open smile and the other, a closed smirk. This line also re-released the "Getting Ready" smiling face mold.

In 2007, a somewhat controversial line was launched, called "Growing Up Glam". These dolls feature a turnable key on their back that can make the doll grow taller and grow breasts, similar to the infamous "Growing Up Skipper" doll.

Mattel ceased selling My Scene dolls in the US in 2008, but continued to sell the dolls internationally, until Mattel ceased production on the My Scene line as a whole in 2011.

A relaunch of the original doll line was released in 2024 as a collector edition line. The relaunch featured the three doll characters the line started with; Barbie, Chelsea, and Madison. A second wave, consisting of Nolee and Jai, followed in 2025.

== Legal issues ==
On April 13, 2005, Mattel's competing toy company, MGA Entertainment, filed a lawsuit against Mattel for its My Scene brand, alleging duplication of its Bratz dolls' multi-ethnic looks, fashions, and packaging. The suit further accused Mattel of "engaging in acts of unfair competition and intellectual property infringement intended to damage its market share, confuse consumers and trade on the company's goodwill."

In 2006, Mattel countersued MGA Entertainment, alleging that Bratz creator Carter Bryant had been working for Mattel when he developed the idea for Bratz in 1999 and had taken the idea to MGA secretly, with MGA in turn developing the first-generation Bratz dolls while obscuring Bryant's involvement. Bryant and Mattel reached a settlement before trial, at which a federal jury awarded Mattel $100 million in damages for the violation of their intellectual property in 2008, and further issued an injunction that forced MGA to stop producing Bratz.

In a 2011 retrial, however, MGA toy makers claimed that in producing the My Scene dolls, Mattel had stolen their trade secrets and violated antitrust laws, and sought $1 billion in damages. The judge found in favor of MGA, and MGA received an award totaling $309.9 million, freeing the company to produce Bratz once again—at which time Mattel retired the My Scene line.

== Media franchise ==
Starting in the year of 2003 with the "Hanging Out" line, Mattel began packaging My Scene dolls with DVDs that contained short video clips, music, and activities. This began a trend that sparked three My Scene films, all of which aired on the Nickelodeon cable network. The My Scene line also features four special edition dolls present only in the My Scene films. These include the Jamaican-American characters Jai and Tyson from Jammin' in Jamaica, and Ryan Ridley (a new fictional character) and Lindsay Lohan from My Scene Goes Hollywood. Mattel received special rights to create the only likeness of Lohan for the line.

=== Films ===
Mattel released three My Scene films between 2004 and 2005 as follows:

==== My Scene: Jammin' in Jamaica (2004) ====
My Scene: Jammin' in Jamaica was released to DVD on May 15, 2004, and later premiered on Nickelodeon on June 6, 2004. It was sold with the "Jammin' in Jamaica" dolls and was directed by Eric Fogel, the creator of Celebrity Deathmatch. The plot involves Madison who is the manager of a band called Urban Desire, which is made up of the four male characters. When the band wins a contest, they make a trip to Jamaica for the finals, but Barbie, Nolee, and Chelsea must raise the money to travel to Jamaica. After all the characters arrive in Jamaica, Barbie feels left out as her boyfriend, the lead guitarist, begins spending more time with Madison. This causes a rift between the friends but is eventually resolved.

==== My Scene: Masquerade Madness (2004) ====
My Scene: Masquerade Madness was the second My Scene film, released to DVD on June 1, 2004, and later premiered on Nickelodeon on October 24, 2004. It runs 28 minutes long. The plot revolves around the Masquerade Madness fashion show, a fundraiser for the local animal shelter. Chelsea designs the fashions for the show all on her own, causing strain on her schoolwork. Failing in geometry and too embarrassed to tell her friends, she calls on Hudson's help in tutoring. As a result, her friends begin to think they are secretly dating. In the end, Chelsea has aced her geometry test and coordinated a successful fashion show. This film was sold with the My Scene "Masquerade Madness" dolls.

==== My Scene Goes Hollywood: The Movie (2005) ====
My Scene Goes Hollywood: The Movie, was the first and only film to be sold apart from the dolls and the only full-length film. Eric Fogel reprised his role as director. It was released to DVD on August 30, 2005 by Buena Vista Home Entertainment under the Miramax Family label, and later premiered on Nickelodeon on October 23, 2005. It featured a voice-over by actress and singer Lindsay Lohan, who plays as herself. Kelly Sheridan of the Barbie film series reprised her role as Barbie. The plot involves the My Scene girls pretending to be extras in a spy action movie being filmed in New York City, in order to see it up close. When one of the actresses is injured, Madison is called upon to take her place. She begins spending less and less time with her friends and develops a crush on the leading actor, Ryan Ridley. Madison ends up fighting with her friends because they embarrass her. In the end, Lohan convinces Madison that friends are the most important thing to have, and the girls make up. Although the title suggests a trip to Hollywood, the setting of the film actually takes place in New York City.

=== Web series ===
My Scene is a web series that ran from 2002 until 2008 on the My Scene official website. The theme song of the series is "It's My Scene".

==== My Scene webisodes (2002–2008) ====
There are 30 episodes released on the official website between 2002 and 2008, some of which were featured in "B Cinemas" on the BarbieGirls.com website. The last 10 episodes did not feature Barbie and Nolee after being discontinued from the line. The following is the list of episodes in published order (according to timeline):

No.	Title	Notes
1	"Lost or Found?"	
2	"Next Stop"	
3	"Does She Buy It?"	
4	"Game On?"	
5	"Rumor Has It"	
6	"Night on the Town"	
7	"Chillin' Out"	
8	"Hanging Out"	a full (5 POV )special webisode from the Hanging Out Line prior to Jammin' in Jamaica
9	"Sk8er Girl"	
10	"Shopping Spree"	
11	"Greatest Gifts"	
12	"Getting Ready"	
13	"Costume Dress-Up"	a special webisode for Masquerade Madness
14	"Club Birthday"	
15	"Shhh... It's a Secret!"	
16	"A Snowed-In Holiday"	
17	"Miami Getaway"	
18	"Mall Maniacs"	
19	"'Tis the Season"	
20	"Day & Nite"	
21	"Fab Faces"	
22	"DJ Nia"	
23	"Salsa Beat"	
24	"In Uniform"	
25	"Egyptian Nights"	
26	"Act 1"	
27	"Act 2"	
28	"Act 3"	
29	"Act 4"	
30	"Act 5"	

==== My Scene Spanish episodes (2004–2005) ====
There are 23 episodes released between 2004 and 2005 that were only featured in Spanish (and Portuguese). The animation art style changed, similar to the one used for Jammin' in Jamaica. These appeared as TV shorts on Nickelodeon in South America and the UK. A now lost English dub was made for the UK, where the viewer could vote on the Nick UK website for what ending for a specific episode would air. Compilations of these episodes would also appear on DVDs in Kellogg's cereal boxes, paired with content from Max Steel. The following is the list of episodes (in English and Spanish) in published order (according to timeline):

No.	English title	Spanish title
1	"Trip to Paris"	"Viaje a París"
2	"New York Without Friends"	"Nueva York Sin Amigas"
3	"Fashion show"	"Desfile de Modas"
4	"The Challenge"	"El Reto"
5	"Trip to London"	"Viaje a Londres"
6	"Chat, Lies and Encounters"	"Chat, Mentiras y Encuentros"
7	"Barbie Loses Yorkie"	"Barbie Pierde a Yorkie"
8	"Happy Birthday Madison!"	"¡Feliz Cumpleaños Madison!"
9	"The Tarot Cards"	"Las Cartas del Tarot"
10	"The Casting"	"El Casting"
11	"Picnic"	"Picnic"
12	"Costume Party"	"Fiesta de Disfraces"
13	"Love and Friendship"	"Amor y Amistad"
14	"Meeting Olimpia"	"Conociendo a Olimpia"
15	"Fear to Fly"	"Miedo a Volar"
16	"The Motorhome"	"El Motorhome"
17	"Wrong Suitcase"	"Maleta Equivocada"
18	"Haunted House"	"La Casa Embrujada"
19	"First Anniversary"	"Primer Aniversario"
20	"The Amulet"	"El Amuleto"
21	"Snow Storm"	"Tormenta de Nieve"
22	"A More Active Role"	"Un Rol Más Activo"
23	"Reaching Hollywood"	"Llegando a Hollywood"

=== Video games ===
- My Scene (PC) (2003)
- My Scene Goes Hollywood (PC) (2005)

=== Website ===
The official My Scene website was launched in 2002 which included games, webisodes, character bios and videos. After the line was discontinued in 2011, the website eventually closed in 2014 alongside the Pixel Chix website.

== Characters ==
=== The "My Scene" girls ===
- Barbie is "...cute but edgy", with pale skin, blonde hair, and blue eyes. Her birthday is September 30 and her astrological sign is Libra. Her favorite place is the spa and she loves yoga, massage, and pedicures, chatting with cute guys, and going to movies and parties with her friends. Her favorite beverage is iced coffee and she cannot live without her cellphone. River is her boyfriend. Her pet is Yorkie. She moved to California and was replaced by Kennedy. Barbie is voiced by Kelly Sheridan, who is also starred in the Barbie film series.
- Madison (Westley in Europe) is African-American, with dark skin, light blue eyes and medium brown hair. She was one of the original three dolls and the 'shopper' of the gang. According to the official My Scene website, she is an urban girl, who enjoys traveling in style, spending her time getting manicures at her favorite spa, and going shopping. She is romantically paired with Sutton. Her birthday is August 3 and her astrological sign is Leo. She lives with her father and cannot go anywhere without her journal. In Europe, she is called Westley, but in the US, she is named after Madison Avenue, a major shopping district. Her pet is Bella. Madison is voiced by Kathleen Barr.
- Chelsea has light (then pale) skin, brown/hazel eyes, and auburn hair. Chelsea is an artist and was one of the original dolls. She wants to be a fashion designer and according to the official website, her signature look is "...original and funky." Her birthday is November 10 and her astrological sign is Scorpio. She loves retro clothing stores, her prized possession is her notebook and she loves pets. She is named after the Chelsea neighborhood in New York City, and her pet alternates between Mambo and Churro. Chelsea is voiced by Nicole Bouma.
- Nolee is of Asian-American descent, with black hair, light skin, and brown eyes. She was the fourth doll in the My Scene line and is a fortune-telling skater girl. Her birthday is May 23 and her astrological sign is Gemini. She dated Bryant until 2003, the year Bryant was dropped from the My Scene line after he moved to London. According to the official website, she is good at keeping secrets, believes in good luck and karma, and her look is described as "athletic". She was discontinued in the shows. She is named after Nolita in New York and her pet is Cookie. Nolee is voiced by Tegan Moss.
- Delancey is of Irish and Italian descent. This doll was originally produced with maroon-streaked platinum blonde hair, green eyes, pale skin, and a beauty mark on her cheek. In 2007, she was produced with dark brown hair with blonde streaks and greenish-blue eyes. She is from California and is a skater and surfer. She is Chelsea's cousin. According to the My Scene website, she enjoys the beach. Ellis is her boyfriend. Her birthday is May 10 and her astrological sign is Taurus. Her look is edgy, funky, and colorful. She was named after Delancey Street in New York City. Her pet is named Sugar. Delancey is voiced by Meghan Black.
- Kenzie has red hair, lightly freckled skin, and green eyes and is from Atlanta, Georgia. Kenzie has appeared four times since she was introduced in 2004. She and Nolee were very close and, according to the official website, Kenzie works at her cart in the shopping mall and also creates scents. Her birthday is June 25 and her astrological sign is Cancer. She likes to make people laugh, and her style is characterized as "cute." Her pet is Coco, and was a repaint of Barbie's dog, Yorkie. Kenzie is voiced by Ashleigh Ball.
- Kennedy has golden-blonde hair, light (then tanned) skin, and gray-blue eyes. She replaced Barbie in 2006 after Barbie moved to California. She enjoys going to cafés, parties, and traveling. Kennedy is an Aquarius who is "...a celebrity in training" and came from Hollywood. She is named after John F. Kennedy International Airport in New York City and her pet is Yorkie, a dog.
- Nia has green eyes, tanned skin, and strawberry-blonde hair. The newest Latina in the group, she was introduced in 2008. Born in Mexico City, she now lives in Miami. She is a DJ. The official website states that she likes to be loud, funny, and the life of any party. Her astrological sign is Libra and she loves reading romance books.
- Jai is dark-skinned with brown eyes and dark brown hair. She is from the Caribbean country of Jamaica, and sells clothes and jewelry made by herself at a stand. There she met Sutton, who flirts with her, and was sold in a gift set with him in the "Jammin' in Jamaica: Bicycle Built for Two" line. Her astrological sign is Taurus. Her pet is a Chihuahua dog named Blanca. Jai is voiced by Brenda M. Crichlow.
- Lindsay Lohan – Mattel received special rights to create the only likeness of actress and singer Lindsay Lohan for their "My Scene Goes Hollywood" line.

=== The "My Scene" boys ===
- Bryant has green eyes and strawberry blonde hair. He was introduced in Game On along with Hudson and made his last appearance in Rumor Has It before moving to London. According to the official website, he is an Aquarius born on February 6, snacks on wasabi green peas, loves video cameras, likes to skateboard, and would not watch a buddy cop movie. He is probably happiest when he is behind a camera, as he loves documenting every moment. He was marketed as Nolee's boyfriend. It is rumored he was created to look like American Idol runner-up Justin Guarini. A character identical in appearance to Bryant was featured in a webisode on Kennedy's homepage. He is never supposed to be Bryant, but a rock star who went to school with Kennedy in Hollywood. Bryant was named after New York's Bryant Park. Bryant was the least produced of the boys and discontinued in 2003.
- Hudson is Caucasian with light blue eyes, pale skin, and blonde hair. He was one of the first male dolls to be introduced in the My Scene line and is often romantically paired with Chelsea. According to the official website, his favorite sport is soccer, he likes to hang out in Central Park, he gets around on foot, and cell phones are his pet peeve. He is named after the Hudson River in New York, and his sign is Capricorn due to his December 23 birthday. Hudson is voiced by Kirby Morrow.
- River has dark hair, a fair skin tone, and brown eyes. He is Barbie's boyfriend. According to the official website, he is a rock musician, his birthday is on December 3 (or 6) and his sign is Sagittarius. His favorite music is the post-punk genre. He snacks on tofu dogs and likes girls with a great smile. He lives for music, as he feels it is the only way he can express himself, so he plays with a few different bands. He is also named after the Hudson River in New York. River is voiced by Alessandro Juliani.
- Sutton is African-British with dark brown hair, brown skin, and eyes, and is from London. His character is less developed than those of Hudson and River; the original Sutton doll came with art supplies, while later dolls came variably with musical and computer accessories. He is sometimes romantically paired with Madison and, according to the official website, he has an urban look. He was born on April 17 and his sign is Aries. His favorite food is french fries, although "[he] calls 'em "chips," he makes his own music, and looks for a girl who's "sweet...but can get sassy, too!" He likes New York City. He's supposed to be a bit of a ladies' man, as well as a fantastic dancer. He's named after Sutton in South London. Sutton is voiced by Mark Hildreth.
- Ellis is characterized as Caucasian, with brown hair, a pale skin tone, and green eyes. He is Delancey's boyfriend. According to the official website, his birthday is March 1 and his sign is Pisces. His favorite food is New York pizza, he drinks chai tea and takes acting lessons with the hope of one day being in movies, although he does not want to become a shallow Hollywood movie star. He was somewhat scared of acting at first, but now he enjoys it, saying "performing is such a rush". Ellis was the second least produced of the My Scene boys and was discontinued in 2004 after he moved. He is named after Ellis Island in New York. Ellis is voiced by Shane Meier.
- Tyson is Jamaican with brown skin, blonde hair, and hazel eyes. He likes surfing and flirting with girls. His astrological sign is Scorpio. He owns a 5-star hotel named Jamaican Palms. His love interest is Chelsea, and was sold in the "Jammin' in Jamaica: Surfrider" line.
- Ryan Ridley – like Lindsay Lohan, he is an actor and also a screenwriter and producer. He has dark brown hair with matching eye color and a pale skin tone; the "My Scene Goes Hollywood" film has a tanned version. Ryan is voiced by Samuel Vincent.

=== Pets ===
Each of the My Scene girls (and three of the boys) own pets. Barbie/Kennedy's, Chelsea's, Madison's, and Nolee's are all introduced in Wave 2. Delancey's kittens were introduced in the "Getting Ready" wave, and her adult cat was introduced in "Masquerade Madness". Kenzie's unnamed brown Yorkie is introduced in "Masquerade Madness". Hudson's dog is introduced in "Getting Ready", while River's and Sutton's are introduced in "Masquerade Madness".

- Yorkie is a Yorkshire Terrier owned by Barbie (and later, Kennedy). According to the My Scene website, Yorkie is a female. However, since Yorkie is presented as a white dog, she could well be a West Highland Terrier (Westie) but her breed is uncertain.
- Mambo, also known as Churro, is a chihuahua owned by Chelsea. The My Scene website stated that he is male, but he is shown wearing female clothing in the "Teen T-Shirts" line.
- Bella is a Carlin Pinscher owned by Madison. Bella is a female, confirmed by the My Scene website, and by her name.
- Cookie is a pug owned by Nolee(and later, Nia). He is male.
- Sugar is an adult female cat owned by Delancey. Sugar gave birth to kittens in the "Getting Ready" line, including Pinky, the only kitten that Delancey kept.
- Coco is Kenzie's brown Yorkshire Terrier.
- Blanca is Jai's Carlin Pinscher.
- St. Bernard is Hudson's unnamed St. Bernard. It was the only male-owned pet introduced before "Masquerade Madness", and it is the only one of the boys' dogs to be produced twice. The dog was quite large in "Getting Ready", where it was introduced. It was shrunk to the other pets' sizes in its second appearance ("Masquerade Madness"), however.
- Bull Mastiff is River's unnamed bull mastiff. It was introduced in "Masquerade Madness".
- Husky is Sutton's unnamed husky. It was introduced in "Masquerade Madness".

== See also ==
- Barbie
- Barbie's friends and family
- Barbie (media franchise)
- My Scene: Jammin' in Jamaica
- My Scene Goes Hollywood: The Movie
- Bratz
