= Tyco R/C Racin' Ratz =

2000 video game

- Developer: KnowWonder Inc.
- Publisher: Mattel Interactive
- Platform: Game Boy Color
- Release: NA: 28 November 2000
- Genre: Puzzle
- Mode: Single-player

Tyco R/C Racin' Ratz is a 2000 video game developed by American studio KnowWonder and published by Mattel Interactive for the Game Boy Color. The game is a licensed title based upon remote control toy cars of the same name produced by Mattel, and was announced at E3 2000. Upon release, Racin' Ratz received average reviews, with critics noting that the game's design had greater similarities to a puzzle title than a racing title, and critiquing the graphics.

== Gameplay ==

Players choose one of two characters, Chris or Betty, and control a remote control Racin' Ratz car in twenty five stages across ten levels based in rooms of a house. The objective of the game is to cause mayhem in the house by completing specific tasks, such as taking or knocking over household items. To navigate the levels, players maneuver through traps and obstacles, and complete puzzles to acquire power-ups to access new areas of the house, including those that allow the car to bounce, shrink, or climb walls. Progress in the game is saved through the use of a password system.

== Reception ==
Reception

Review scores
| Publication | Score |
|---|---|
| AllGame | 3.5/5 |
| IGN | 6/10 |
| Nintendo Power | 6.0 |

Racin' Ratz received average reviews from critics upon release. Describing the game as "a real challenge and a lot of fun to play", Craig Harris of IGN highlighted the title's puzzle gameplay, but faulted the game's lack of a "sense of urgency" and its "ugly" and "nasty" in-game and background graphics. Jon Thompson of Allgame commended the game's "challenge and fun" and "interesting" and "creative" combination of racing and puzzle gameplay, whilst finding that the game fundamentally was not a racing game due to the lack of time limits and speed, also critiquing its lack of challenge or replay value. Nintendo Power similarly noted that, contrary to the title, the game was "not a racing game" and more focused on puzzle mechanics.
