= My Child =

Toy line from Mattel

A My Child doll

My Child dolls are a toy made by Mattel from 1986 to 1988. In 1986, they were featured in both the Sears and JC Penney Christmas catalogs in the United States. The dolls were available in a variety of skin tones, hair colors, hair styles, eye colors, and outfits, making each one unique. They were seen as Mattel's answer to Cabbage Patch Kids made by Coleco, which were at their peak of popularity, and were sold in the U.S., Europe, and Australia. In 1987, Mattel introduced a new line of My Child dolls called My Loving Baby. After both dolls failed to gain sufficient traction, 1988 became the final year of their production.

While most of the dolls' heads were made of felt, some were made of vinyl. They were approximately 35 cm tall, with small features and poseable limbs. Mattel marketed the line as having relatable features and outfits. The line developed an international following.

== History ==
The first dolls were made in Taiwan. Their features differ slightly from those made later in China. A rounder face, smaller belly button and longer toes are just some of the differences. Taiwanese dolls are also known for eyes which protrude from their face and, as they age, are more prone to facial "sagging" and make-up fading (but are less prone to felt pilling) than those made in China.

Between 1987 and 1988, Mattel brought out a vinyl-faced doll called a "Loving Baby". These dolls had bodies made with the same soft fabric as a My Child, with similar skin-tones, posable legs and solid arm-joints and pink or blue torsos. A button on their back allowed them to hug. Their skin-tone was either pale or peachy, and they had red, brunette, ash-blond or blond hair. They came with one outfit, a two-piece short-and-top set in either blue or pink.

== Description ==
Dolls came as boys or girls, with four different skin tones: American pale (with a green heart on the bottom), Australian/European peach, African-American, and Hispanic. Canada also produced its own dolls (identified by having two tags, instead of the normal one).

Eye color varies too. All African-American and Hispanic dolls had brown eyes (Hispanic dolls eyes have orange rays above their pupils). The other dolls had blue, aqua, green, or brown eyes. Occasionally a doll can be found with a factory 'flaw' and their eye color can vary from the standard, for example hazel, lilac, blue-gray, blue-green, and green. However, some people attribute this to aging rather than to a factory flaw.

There is also a variety of hair colors. The African-American dolls have black hair; Hispanics have dark brown hair, and the others had platinum blonde, ash-blonde (two tone), brunette, red, and (in the last year of production) strawberry-blonde. Strawberry-blonde therefore being the rarest and most valuable, followed by red heads and brunettes. Upon production, red heads and brunettes were batched at a lower ratio to the ash-blondes and platinum blondes (making them the most common).

Hair styles varied as well. African-American girls all came with 'curly pigtails' (two pigtails with a short fringe right around the head). The other girls had 'top-knots' (short hair with one small bunch on the side), 'double top-knots' (short hair with a small bunch on either side), 'curly pigtails' (similar to the African-American dolls). Only American dolls had these hair styles. Hispanic girls came with a v-part style (hair worn down, with little bunches on either side of the head, but with a difference being that they did not have a full fringe typical of other My Childs). Australian and European dolls (identifiable by the 'HR' visible at the end of the ID code on the tag, and peachy skin) were manufactured with other variations of pigtails (known as 'double ribbons' and 'ringlet ponies'). As well as the v-part and crimp (similar to the Hispanic girls, only with a full fringe) and the 'ultra-long' (nearly to dolls' ankles) worn in bunches on either side. In 1988, as part of the 'Ribbons & Bows' collection introduced solely to the Australian market, the 'side-part', and 'mid-part' were made. These dolls had long tightly curled hair (similar to antique dolls) worn down. Boys' hairstyles were either curly with no part or straight with a short part.

Other facial features differ between dolls. Eyelashes range in color from peachy-orange through to dark brown (found on peach eyeshadow only). Or dark grey to near black (found on 'grape' or 'charcoal' eyeshadow). Cheek color is either pink or peachy-orange. Lip color varies between pale to dark cool pink and pale peach to dark peachy-orange. Grape and charcoal eyeshadow are the most sought after, and come only with pink cheeks and lips. Peach eyeshadow however can be found with either the peach cheeks/lips or the pink cheek/lips. African American and Hispanic dolls have charcoal eyeshadow, with warm red cheeks and lips and are the only ones to have this combination.

== Clothing ==
The dolls came with many different clothing outfits. Girl dolls had sailor dresses, pinafore outfits (with or without a little book and pocket bear), smocked party dresses, seersucker overall outfits, sleeper sets (with fluffy slippers and a teddy bear), ducky dresses, flare dresses, playtime/ABC dresses, Australian pinafores/jumpers, school dresses and many others. The boys had their own outfits; some of these are the sailor outfit, ducky overall outfit, vest and shorts outfit, sweater outfit. Other outfits were available separately.

Shoes were sold in 2 different styles, a Mary-Jane/t-bar style or a lace-up Oxford.

== My Pets ==
My Pets were also sold. They were puppies (blue and tan), bears (gray and brown), cats (yellow and pink) and rabbits (purple and white). With the same "My Child" eyes, they had an animal-style mouth, with fur covered bodies (their hands, soles of their feet and stomachs showing through).

== Collecting ==
A collection of My Child dolls

Collectors look for many things when looking to purchase a doll. Certain facial features, eye and hair colors, styles and skin tone may affect a doll's desirability and so will influence the price. These dolls are now around 40 years old, and as they were designed as a children's toy, many are in "played-with" condition, which varies from slight pilling, eye scratches and other damage, stains, broken joints, "melted-eye syndrome" and hair-cuts.
