= Furryville =

Toy line by Mattel

- Type: Toy
- Company: Mattel
- Country: Germany
- Availability: 2005–?

Furryville is a German line of Mattel toys launched in 2005. Furryville toys are small stuffed animals up to 3 inches in height. The line consists of many types of animals, usually sold in sets. They are typically packaged as either a family of four animals of the same species or as "two-furs", two toys sold together (but not always of the same species). A Furryville toy can also be sold individually, such as "Kangaroo Court" (a tennis-playing kangaroo) or "Sensational Groom" (a wedding skunk). They are available online only.

The families are named for their species, in additions to groups like "Family Moments", "Around the World" and "Town Collection".

In 2006, Mattel came under fire from nurses for a new single called "Nurse Quacktitioner". Thousands of nurses complained to Mattel about the reference to "quacks" – in medicine a common expression for a medical practitioner who is a fraud. Mattel replied that the figure was a duck, and that ducks "quack". The figure was withdrawn from the market.
