= Teen Trends =

Brand of dolls

Teen Trends was a line of dolls created by Mattel released in 2005. Teen Trends dolls are unique in being 17 inches tall, making them closer to the height of American Girl dolls than other 12-inch fashion dolls such as Barbie. There are four characters, each receiving 2 dolls, with a third “wave” of dolls that introduced a 5th character being shown, but never released.

The line has been inactive since 2006-2007, making the status likely discontinued.

== Dolls ==
- Gabby: A bubbly girly girl who loves to go shopping and going to the spa. Her favorite color is pink and has pink all over her room. Her dog's name is Taffy.
- Deondra: A girl who loves hip-hop music and bling and is always seen with some on. Her friends call her Lil' Dee. Her favorite color is purple and she has a dog named Sugar.
- Courtney: A girl who loves riding horses, drawing, being into sports and helping out with school clubs. Her favorite color is light blue. She also enjoys going on walks. She has a dog named Francie.
- Kianna: A rocker who is into writing and playing music, going to rock concerts, and experimenting with fashion. She has a dog named Cleo and plays songs for him to see if the music she wrote was good. Her favorite color is red.
- Rayna: A girl originally from Japan, who loves anything Harajuku and cute. Her doll was shown at the 2006 New York Toy Fair, but never released.

== Controversy ==
When the Bratz Wild Wild West line was created MGA Entertainment released a doll named Kiana, Mattel's doll, Kianna, had a totally different personality. Mattel's doll was a rocker and MGA's doll was a cow girl. Mattel insisted the dolls were the same and the Bratz Kiana was discontinued.
