= Xtractaurs =

Line of dinosaur toys by Mattel

Xtractaurs is a line of toys by Mattel. Introduced in 2009, the brand is a fusion of regular action figures with an online game. It involves taking a dinosaur (both well-known and lesser-known dinosaurs) and extracting "DNA" samples from the dinosaur and analyzing it on your computer, similar in a way to the book and film Jurassic Park. If you own multiple dinosaurs and have extracted samples from all of them, you can create a genetically engineered hybrid on the computer to battle the "Megavores", ancient reawakened dinosaurs that share qualities with your dinosaur. Each dinosaur you purchase has a special ability, and combining them makes a fierce fighting animal (your first dinosaur, Tyrannosaurus rex, has the Chomp ability). This encourages the fusion of certain samples even more.

As of 2012, the https://www.xtractaurs.com site has been taken down, and no usable site has been implemented for the toy series. As a result, there is no use for the toy sets other than display.

== Reception ==
Xtractaurs have been reviewed by WIRED magazine and The Washington Times. The toys have also been the subject of an academic study published in the Journal of Early Childhood Literacy.

== Gameplay ==
To play the game, you must first purchase the Starter Kit, containing a DNA extractor gun, a Tyrannosaurus rex, and the Xtractaurs installation CD. You first must insert the CD into your computer to install the Xtractaurs software. Once installed, you can open the software, create an account (You must have Broadband Internet connection to play online), and can plug in your DNA extractor gun with a cable on the handle of the gun, which ends in a male USB plug. You are now ready for extraction. Your T. rex has a female TRS port, much like the one in an iPod or iPhone, in its thigh (as all dinosaurs under the brand do on a part of their body), and is compatible with a male TRS plug on the barrel of the extractor gun. When you plug the two, a display will appear on your screen showing a DNA strand. This means that electronics in the dinosaur are sending signals through the gun, through the cable, and into your computer. When done, an online version of your dinosaur pops up onto your screen. From there, you can play online games with your dinosaur, and begin your Xtractaurs adventure.

== Dinosaur species ==
Tyrannosaurs

- Tyrannosaurus rex – Ultrabite
- Daspletosaurus – Megastomp
- Gorgosaurus – Terroar
- Tarbosaurus – Lacerator
- Nanotyrannus – Quickfire

Raptors

- Velociraptor – Snaptor
- Deinonychus – Strykem
- Utahraptor – Riptile
- Dromaeosaurus – Slashclaw

Stegosaurs

- Stegosaurus – Whipslash
- Dacentrurus – Thornback
- Yingshanosaurus – Twinstrike

Pterosaurs

- Pteranodon – Wingstorm
- Criorhynchus – Beakbash
- Tapejara – Dreadhead
- Quetzalcoatlus – Wingsurge

Ceratopsids

- Triceratops – Pindown
- Styracosaurus – Battlespike
- Pentaceratops – Trance
- Einiosaurus – Armorus
