= Incredible Edibles =

Toy used to make confectionery

Incredible Edibles was a toy sold by Mattel from 1967 to 1968. It was a series of circular metal molds into which Gobble-Degoop, a gelatin based gel, was squeezed into. The form was then placed in the unit and baked into a rubbery soft candy in the shape of worms, insects, and flowers among others, coming in six flavors: licorice, mint, butterscotch, cherry, root beer and cinnamon. Tutti Fruitti, banana and raspberry were offered in refills and accessory kits.

In 1968 Kooky Kakes was introduced to bake small cakes and decorate them with arms, legs, and faces using Gobble-Degoop and cake mixes. Other accessories could be purchased on blister cards as well as a few additional mold sets.

A Super Incredible Edibles was offered which combines both separate sets into one large set.

The "Incredible Edibles" formula was created by chemist Don Lusk.

== See also ==
- Easy-Bake Oven
