= What's My Name? =

What's My Name? or What's My Name may refer to:

== Music ==
- "What's My Name?" (Rihanna song), 2010
- "What's My Name" (Descendants song), 2017
- "What's My Name?" (Snoop Doggy Dogg song), 1993
- "What's My Name?" (DMX song), 1999
- "What's My Name", a 1977 song by The Clash from The Clash
- "What's My Name", a 2005 song by Chris Brown from Chris Brown
- What's My Name? (Miyavi album), 2010, and the title song
- What's My Name (Steady B album), 1987, and the title song
- What's My Name (Ringo Starr album), 2019, and the title song
- What's My Name? (EP), 2017, by Korean group T-ara, and the title song

== Other ==
- What's My Name? (radio program), American radio program
- An alternative name for the 1967 boxing match Muhammad Ali vs. Ernie Terrell, from a taunt Ali repeated during the fight
