= Upsy Downsy =

Toy line by Mattel

Upsy Downsy is a brand developed by Mattel. It concerns two races of strange beings, one that lives rightside-up (The Upsys), the other upside-down (The Downsys). These psychedelic creatures and their fantasy world were featured in a short-lived line of colorful toys and story books for young children in 1970 (copyright in 1969).

== The Toy Line ==
The toys were small plastic characters with fabric clothing and synthetic yarn hair, all in fantastic, garishly bright colors. Each came with a fold-out cardboard Playland mat, a "Magic Bridge Clip" to link one mat to another, some wild (and often quite fragile!) accessories, a mode of transportation, and a name that summed up their character in a few nonsensical words. All of the individual Playland mats were designed to be placed together using the Bridge Clips to make the "Happidiculous World" of The Upsys and Downsys. The Upsy figures were approximately 2-1/2" tall, basically humanoid in shape, with tiny bodies and huge oversized heads topped with a large bright yarn pompom for hair. The Downsys, on the other hand, were more cartoonish beings, about 4" in height with wild, goofy faces in the middle of a large, rounded body. Downsys' hands are positioned on the tops of their heads, to allow them to stand upside-down.

== The Toys ==
=== Upsys ===
- #3825 Tickle Pinkle - The Upsy Beauty and her Bugabout Car
- #3826 Pudgy Fudgy - The Upsy Eat-Too-Mucher and her Piggybus
- #3827 Flossy Glossy - The Upsy Fire Chiefess and her Elewettrer Fire Engine
- #3828 Baby So-High - The Upsy Hero and her Airo-Zoomer Plane

Like many things in Upsy Downsy Land, the gender of little Baby So-High, the infant pilot, appears a bit confused. In most instances, including all of the books and even the back of the toy's original packaging, Baby is referred to as a "she". But the bright billboard that came in that same package proclaims:

"Air Show Today! See Baby So-High Fly his Airo-Zoomer!" (emphasis added)

=== Downsys ===
- #3829 Mother What Now - The Downsy Frazzled Mom and her Go-Getter car
- #3830 Pocus Hocus - The Downsy Mixed-Up Magician and his Dragon Wagon
- #3831 Miss Information - The Downsy Opposite Directions Teller and her Miss Information Booth
- #3832 Downy Dilly - The Downsy Mischief Maker and her Footmobile

For reasons that remain unclear, the name of Miss Information's Round-Eared, Three-Wheeled, Orange and Turquoise Conveyance has been popularly misnamed by many sources as "Booth Moose". While most of the Upsy vehicles seem to have been based on a particular animal (Piggybus springs to mind), the Downsy rigs are not so designed or constrained. And seeing that The Miss Information Booth hasn't anything remotely resembling antlers, this writer cannot see the remotest basis for this incorrect name.

=== Wiz-z-zers ===
Wiz-z-zers are gyro-powered toy tops that spin crazily when their tips are wound. Produced in many incarnations by Mattel during the late 1960s and well into the '1970s, these wild whirring tops were a perfect fit for the Upsy Downsy line, and were adapted as a pair of bizarre spinning vehicles, each coming with its own exclusive pilot character. Mattel inadvertently reversed the names of the two Wiz-z-zers and their passenger characters in the group cast picture shown on the backs of the toy Play Mats, making the whole endeavor all the more confused. This same source also omitted the name of Tingle Dingle from the image of The Happy Go-Round in most instances.

- #3837 The Furry Hurry Wiz-z-zer with Hithery Thithery (Upsy)
- #3838 The Hairy Hurry Wiz-z-zer with Skelter Helter (Downsy)

=== Playsets ===
- #3833 HAPPY GO-ROUND

The Happy Go-Round Playset features a dazzling three-car carousel. The cars in question are Bugabouts (similar to Tickle Pinkle's car, but in different colors), which are connected to the central umbrella support by a three-way axle, so that all the cars rotate around the wobbly platform at once. The Set also includes an extra-large Playland Mat, a Magic Bridge Clip, a streetlamp, a fence, an Upsy Downsy Daisy, and most importantly, exclusive Upsy patrons Foozie Woozie and Tingle Dingle. Tingle Dingle is a lovely pink Upsy with a tiny jingle bell tied to the ribbon in her purple pompom hair, and Foozie Woozie is an odd-looking green Upsy, who is shown in every source illustration (toy packaging, storybook appearances, Mattel Toy Catalogs) as wearing big black round framed spectacles. But for whatever reason, the toy released of Foozie Woozie came wearing a pair of Miss Information's stylized horn-rimmed glasses instead, to the detriment of the character's appearance.

- #3834 FUNNY FEEDER

The Funny Feeder is the Downsy Land Hamburger Stand. The strange contraption features a spring-loaded tongue sticking out of its huge, grinning mouth. When the top of The Funny Feeder's chef's hat is pressed, the tongue reacts, springing the loaded burger at an eager customer. The Feeder is manned by Downsy cook Short Order and Gooey Chooey, who according to the Funny Feeder's packaging, was intended to act as a waitress/server, but was also characterized in the storybooks as Short Order's best customer. The Set came with an oversized Playland Mat, a Magic Bridge Clip, a fence, a streetlamp, a Billboard (Advertising "Downside-Up Burgers"), a serving tray, and three of the afore-mentioned burgers on plates, ready for launching. The Mattel Toy Catalogs promoting the Upsy Downsy toy line used the phrase "The air is filled with hamburger!" to describe the Funny Feeder.

=== Unreleased Accessories ===
The 1970 Mattel Toy Catalog showed and described two large Accessory pieces for the Upsy Downsy line. These items were not released, and were thus not featured in the truncated Upsy Downsy coverage in the 1971 Mattel Catalog.

- #4967 UPSY DOWNSY CARRYING CASE

This figural vinyl case was round, and resembled a large Downsy, with cartoon graphics of one unknown Downsy and two unknown Upsys lurking in the large Downsy's clothing. With a set of molded limbs on each end acting as handles, the Carrying Case was likely intended to stand either upside down or rightside up.

- #4968 UPSY DOWNSY COUNTRY CASE FEATURING HAPPIDICULOUS HILL

This immense vinyl and styrene square case would have stood 12" tall, with four fold-down sides that laid flat to form a gigantic 36" x 36" play habitat for the Upsy Downsy figures and accessories, including a 7-1/2" vac-molded rendering of Happidiculous hill, a prominent landmark mentioned in the storybooks. The hill featured a winding road, a staircase and a bridged waterfall all cascading from its heights. The Case's removable lid formed a walled lake with a bridge (carry handle) across it, and each of the fold-down areas featured a small structure: a tunnel, a tree house (house tree?), a cave, and what appears to be a miniature Happy Go-Round!. The prototype case shown in the 1970 Mattel Toy Catalog did not seem to feature any roadways in its design, which seems odd, because the cardboard Playland Mats that came with each doll and toy were supposed to be laid around the edges of the case, making the large play area even larger. But there are plenty of lakes and waterways seen in the cases prototype artwork, a design choice which is supported by anecdotal evidence from the line's creators that there were a number of Upsy and Downsy boats and nautical themed characters planned, had the line continued past the first year

== The Book Line ==
Eight of the main Upsy Downsy characters were spotlighted in a series of lush, colorful (and slightly psychedelic) Storybooks that chronicled their crazy adventures.

There was also a larger book, Welcome to Upsy Downsy Land, which introduced the Happidiculous World and its inhabitants as a whole.

This book told of the surreal origins of the Upsys and Downsys. They were once merely flowers, covering an entire world made of fuzzy dandelions. A sentient wind called The Great Huff passed by this world long ago, and, having his nose tickled by the dandelions, blew them all away. As the dandelions fell back to earth, some of them fell through a rainbow, and were magically changed into rightside-up beings known as Upsys. Other dandelions fell through a storm cloud, and became upside-down creatures called Downsys. The two factions, despite each being the others' polar opposite, got along famously, and developed their own little civilization, which came to be known as "Upsy Downsy Land".

=== The Storybooks ===
- "Welcome To Upsy Downsy Land"
- "Flossy Glossy and The Hard-to-find Fire"
- "Tickle Pinkle and The Beautiful Birthday Party"
- "Pudgy Fudgy and The Whirl-around Picnic"; For the second time in the storybook series, Pudgy Fudgy winds up commandeering the Furry Hurry Wiz-z-zer, whose actual corresponding Upsy, Hithery Thithery, is nowhere to be found. He DID make an unbilled, silent cameo in Flossy Glossy's book, which is the extent of the characterization that he ever received.
- "Baby So-High and The Just-Right Pet"
- "Downy Dilly and The Monster Trick"; Several story elements from "Downy Dilly and The Monster Trick" appear to be lifted verbatim from the character's toy Playland Mat. The Downsy beach that she visits features green sand (all Downsy Playland Mats sport green landscape), and Downy's also features a sandbox and beach umbrella. A series of footprints covering the Playland ground (presumably made by Downy's Footmobile) are mirrored by the Sea Monster footprints that Downy digs in the sand as part of her titular "Trick".
- "Pocus Hocus and The Magic House-Tree"
- "Mother What Now and The Mixed-up Treasure"
- "Miss Information and The Upsy Downsy Circus"
- There was also a 14-Page Upsy Downsy Coloring Book, which was a free give-away item intended to promote the line. The 1970 Mattel Catalog mentions an "Initial Distribution Upsy Downsy Assortment (#D3860), which would come with 24 Basic toy sets, 24 character storybooks, 12 Feature storybooks, and 200 of these Free coloring books, all shipped in "a floor-standing display merchandiser". Dated 1970, the Coloring Book utilized artwork from "Welcome To Upsy Downsy Land", and recounted the groups' origin. While none of the regular Upsy or Downsy characters are cited or indicated anywhere therein, a large two-page spread of most of the cast at the end of the Coloring Book goes out of its way to spotlight the two Wiz-z-zer vehicles and their riders by name.

=== Other elements of the brand introduced in the books ===
==== Other characters mentioned in the books ====
- Wooly Booly & Moo Choo Engine—Wooly Booly, an Upsy Engineer, was featured prominently in Downy Dilly's storybook. And his bovine locomotive, The Moo Choo, helped to further the plot of Miss Information's story. With these fully developed ancillary characters at the ready, it is interesting to speculate if Mattel might have produced an Upsy Downsy train set, had the line been more successful.

Outside of Wooly Booly, no other Upsy or Downsy was ever mentioned, although Miss Information's storybook made it evident that there is a bustling population of both Upsys and Downsys outside of the 14 characters that were produced as toys. Various birds and animals interacted with the main cast on occasion, such as

- Bunny Funny
- Chatter Chitter the chipmunk and
- What-Nut the squirrel, who all benefitted from the destruction of Pocus Hocus' Magic House-Tree
- Splasha Lotta, a huge pink Sea Monster, appeared in Downy Dilly's storybook, as did his Mamma
- Humdingers, a sort of combination of a bee and a bell, appeared in the "Welcome to Upsy Downsy Land" book
- A flock of Red-tailed Downsy-peckers was referenced, but not seen, in Pocus Hocus' story
- The early bird followed Pudgy Fudgy through a hectic day, commenting succinctly on the action as it went
- A flock of birds with no peculiar designation followed Baby So-High around, echoing commands as they obeyed them
- Upsy Downsy Daisies grew everywhere. and were cited in several books. They could grow up or upside down, and came and went as they pleased

In "Baby So-High and The Just Right Pet", The Upsy Animal Show competition brought the Upsy Downsy cast together to compare and contrast their various unusual animal companions. Included in the proceedings were

- Tickle Pinkle's pet Pinkle Poodle (Pinkle Poodle would also appear in "Miss Information and The Upsy Downsy Circus")
- Flossy Glossy's firedog, Spotless
- Mother What Now's lovebirds, who dwelt in separate cages due to their intense dislike of each other. Their names weren't given
- Pocus Hocus' trick rabbit, who turned into a pink "rab-brella". This rabbit also appeared briefly in "Downy Dilly and The Monster Trick"
- Downy Dilly's sweetly-fragranced skunk, Blossom Apple
- Baby So-High's Downsy Land Kitten, Yow-Me

==== Upsy Downsy Land geographical landmarks mentioned in the books ====
- Lake Fishabit
- Wetter Better Desert
- Daisy Hill
- Candy Factory
- Sleepy Deepy River
- Pocus Hocus' Nutbeech House-Tree on the bank of the Sleepy Deepy River
- Mother What Now’s cottage on the bank of the Sleepy Deepy River
- Flat-as-a-Mat Mountains
- The Fall-Up Falls, an inexplicable (but quite normal in Downsy Land) reverse waterfall, was mentioned on a Billboard sign that came packaged with Miss Information.
- Happidiculous Hill—Mattel even planned to market a Playset/Carrying Case for the toys based on this landmark. It was, however, never produced. In the books, Downy Dilly's inverted mushroom house was located at the top of Happidiculous Hill.
