= Sing-a-ma-jigs =

American stuffed toys

The Sing-a-ma-jigs
- Type: Stuffed toy
- Company: Mattel
- Country: United States
- Availability: 2010–2018
- Slogan: Love singing together!

The Sing-a-ma-jigs were an American line of electronic, singing stuffed toys released by Mattel in 2010.

== Product description ==
Four Sing-a-ma-jigs dolls

Each Sing-a-ma-jig is battery-powered, with two AAA batteries already included. They are soft, stuffed animals with terrycloth mouths, and measure about 12 inches in length. They are all one size only.

The dolls make a variety of different noises when squeezed in the stomach. Each "squeeze" causes the Sing-a-ma-jig to open its mouth to emit noise. The doll's mouth contains a set of plastic teeth that click together when closing. A Sing-a-ma-jig's noises include songs, "jibber-jabber" made up of vowel sounds, different notes on the octave scale, a greeting, and occasionally a goodbye. They each sing a different public-domain song unique to their model. The voice that each one has is unique to its model as well.

== Types ==
=== Basic ===
As of late 2019, there are 22 "basic" Sing-a-ma-jig models: Italicised colors are the ones that have the "Voice Wiggle Effect", although the Aqua and Rose ones were later released as standard versions without that effect. The New Yellow Sing-a-ma-jig was the only one that sang four different songs in the US, Japanese, Korean, and Chinese markets making this one by far the one with the biggest amount of songs.

Color	Song	Vocal Range
Lime	"John Jacob Jingleheimer Schmidt"	Tenor
Purple	"Oh! Susanna"	Soprano
Hot Pink	"A-Tisket, A-Tasket"	Alto
Mint Green	"It's Raining, It's Pouring"	Bass
Light Blue	"For He's a Jolly Good Fellow"	Tenor
New Red	"Yankee Doodle"	Bass
New Yellow	"This Little Light of Mine" (US Version); "The Farmer in the Dell" (Japanese Version); "Sing, Sing, Sing" (a new original song) (Korean Version); "On Top of Old Smokey" (Chinese Version)	Soprano
Dark Blue	"Skinnamarink"	Tenor
White	"Sing, Sing, Sing" (a new original song)	Alto
Aqua	"By the Beautiful Sea"	Bass
Rose	"By the Light of the Silvery Moon"	Soprano
Violet	"99 Sing-a-ma-jigs (On the Wall)"	Alto
Dark Purple	"Oh My Darling, Clementine"	Alto
Lilac	"The Farmer in the Dell"	Soprano
Lemon (Yellow 3)	"She'll Be Coming 'Round the Mountain"	Bass
Yellow 1	"Home on the Range"	Baritone
Red 1	"Where, Oh Where Has My Little Dog Gone?"	Soprano
Pink	"Skip to My Lou"	Soprano
Blue	"When the Saints Go Marching In"	Tenor
Orange	"On Top of Old Smokey"	Baritone
Tangerine	"Over the River and through the Woods"	Alto
Jade Green	"London Bridge Is Falling Down"	Baritone

=== Seasonal ===
In late November 2010, the first holiday-themed Sing-a-ma-jig was introduced for Christmas and sold at Toys "R" Us stores. "Santa" is a dark green doll with a white beard, and a red-and-white Santa Claus jacket and cap. He sings "Jingle Bells".

The second holiday-themed doll was released in February 2011 in time for Valentine's Day. This doll is red with a pink shirt featuring red hearts. Its ears are unique in that they are also shaped like hearts, breaking away from the bear, dog, elephant and rabbit ears used up until now. This doll sings "Let Me Call You Sweetheart" in her alto voice.

In March 2011, the third holiday-themed doll was released for Easter. This Sing-a-ma-jig is a white Easter rabbit with more detailed bunny ears. It sings "Here Comes Peter Cottontail", and rather than saying "Goodbye" or "See you later", signs off by saying, "Happy Easter!" His shirt is covered in a colorful Easter Egg pattern. He has a baritone vocal range.

A 4th of July themed doll was released in time for the holiday in 2011. The doll is red, white and blue, and sings "The Star-Spangled Banner" (the American national anthem). Instead of "Hello!" or "How do you do?", he signs on by saying "Happy Independence Day!" He has a tenor vocal range.

Four Halloween themed dolls were released in October 2011. These Sing-a-ma-jigs included a pumpkin, a ghost, a skeleton, and a witch. All of them sing Trick or Treat and the ghost, skeleton and witch were Target exclusives, whereas the pumpkin was not exclusive. For the way they sign off, the pumpkin and ghost sign off by saying "Happy Halloween!", the skeleton says "Scare You Later' and the Witch says "See you later". Also, for the way they sign on, the pumpkin and ghost say "Trick or Treat" and the skeleton and witch say "Happy Halloween" in their tenor, bass and soprano voices.

In November 2011, two new Christmas themed Sing-a-ma-jigs were released. They included a snowman and a reindeer. The snowman sings Jingle Bells and the reindeer sings "We Wish You a Merry Christmas" in their alto voices.

=== Special Edition ===
There are two Birthday Sing-a-ma-jigs: the pink "Birthday Soprano" and the blue "Birthday Tenor". Each sings "Happy Birthday to You" in different pitches in addition to chattering and harmonizing with other Sing-a-ma-jig characters, and rather than saying "Goodbye" or "See you later", The birthday tenor signs off by saying, "Can I have cake too?" and the birthday soprano signs off by saying, "Bye Bye, Birthday!".

There are also Mickey Mouse and Minnie Mouse Sing-a-ma-jigs. Mickey and Minnie each sing a favorite Disney tune. Mickey sings the Mickey Mouse Clubhouse theme song and Minnie sings the Hot Dog Dance.

=== The Hits! ===
There are 3 Sing-a-ma-jigs in the series' lineup part, it's called "The Hits!". These were only sold in the UK and East Asia and they all have the "Voice Wiggle" effect.

Color	Song	Vocal Range
Red	"All Star" (originally by Smash Mouth, released in the late 1990s)	Tenor
Pink	"Girls Just Want To Have Fun" (originally by Cyndi Lauper, released in the early 1980s)	Soprano
Yellow	"Tutti Frutti" (originally by Little Richard, released in the 1950s)	Alto

=== Kohl's Exclusives ===
3 more dolls were released in 2011 as Kohl's exclusives.

Color	Song	Vocal Range
Purple Fairy	"Twinkle Twinkle Little Star"	Soprano
Pink Mermaid	"Sailing, Sailing"	Soprano
Turquoise Robot	"Ain't We Got Fun"	Baritone

=== Duets ===
Sing-a-ma-jigs "Duets" consist of one larger character holding another smaller character. With one's "key press" in the stomach, they simultaneously open their mouths to sing, harmonize, and chatter together.

Colors include:

Color of Big One	Color of Little One	Song	Existence Confirmed
Purple	Pink Baby	"Hello! Ma Baby"	Yes
Sea Green	Red Puppy	"BINGO"	Yes
Orange	Pink Teddy Bear	"Clementine"	Yes
Plum	Sea Green Baby	"When the Saints Go Marching In"	Yes
Royal Blue	Green Kitten	"For He's a Jolly Good Fellow!"	Yes
Gold	Green Koala	"Yankee Doodle"	Yes
Gold	Blue Koala	"Yankee Doodle"	No
Red	Yellow Puppy	"Where Has My Little Dog Gone?"	Yes
Fuchsia	Green Kitten	"Skinamarink"	Yes
Dark Blue	Yellow Mouse	"On Top of Old Smokey"	Yes

=== Sing-a-ma-lings ===
In 2016, toy company Funrise revived the Sing-a-ma-jigs as the "Sing-a-ma-lings". The first six Sing-a-ma-lings are Sawyer, Darcy, Noodle, Blush, Bo, and Frankie.

Name	Song	Gender
Sawyer	"Row Your Boat"	Male
Darcy	"Twinkle Twinkle Little Star"	Female
Noodle	"On Top of Spaghetti"	Male
Blush	"Mary Had a Little Lamb"	Female
Bo	"Clementine"	Male
Frankie	"Oh Where Has My Little Dog Gone?"	Female
Pierre	"Are You Sleeping"	Male
Sunny	"Good Morning Merry Sunshine"	Female
Alphie	"ABC Song"	Male
Rainie	"It's Raining, It's Pouring"	Female
Tinker	"Pop Goes the Weasel"	Male
LouLou	"Skip to my Lou"	Female

A year later, Sing-a-ma-lings Pets came out. The toys have a pill shaped body with small feet, you activate it by squeezing the body, the mouth works the same as the Sing-a-ma-lings.

There are 4 of them to collect: Sawyer's Pet, Bonsai: Blue Monkey with pink hair Darcy's Pet, Bugle: Purple Dog Blush's Pet, Bunaroo: Pink Bunny with a flower on its ear Frankie's Pet, Butter: Yellow Cat with pink hair and a bow

The Sing-a-ma-lings were discontinued by 2018.
