= Break the Safe (board game) =

Board Game
- Designers: Mattel
- Players: 2-4
- Setup time: <5 minutes
- Playing time: <=30 minutes
- Chance: Medium
- Age range: 8+
- Skills: Dice rolling, Mental strategy

Break the Safe is a cooperative board game made by Mattel.

== Gameplay ==
Break the Safe is a fast-paced, cooperative board game for ages 8 and up where two to four players work as an elite team to find four keys and unlock the safe within 30 minutes, racing against the clock rather than each other.

=== Setting Up ===
Each player selects an agent and places it in the central room. Shuffle all the secret tiles and booby traps and turn them face down. Once they are faced down you may not look at them. Place a secret tile in each room outlined in red. Place a booby trap on top of each secret tile. Divide 12 of the 13 tool cards evenly among all players (if 4 players are playing, each player has 3. If 3 players are playing, each player has 4. If 2 players are playing, each player has 6.). The remaining card, the robot, starts with the player who goes last. The guard and dog are then placed in the guard desk and dog kennel respectively. The safe is placed on the central room and is turned on. Then the time is programmed. (if 4 players are playing, 30 minutes, if 3 players are playing, 22 minutes, if 2 players are playing, 15 minutes). Then the timer is started to begin the game. The timer (found on the safe) counts down in minutes. For each minute, you will hear a beep. For each 5 minutes, you will hear a double beep. The last minute is counted down in seconds. You will hear a beep for each second and a double beep in the last ten seconds. If time runs out, you will hear an alarm that warns you that the safe has exploded.

=== Moving ===
The blue agent goes first, and player moves clockwise. The 12-sided die moves the agents. The 6-sided die moves the guard and the dog. You do not need an exact roll to get into a room. Two or more agents may share the same space. You cannot switch directions on your move. You cannot end your move on the same space you started on.

=== Enemies ===
The guard and the dog are your enemies. If you roll the police badge on the 12-sided die, the guard wakes up and is placed on the "Guard Awake" space located just outside his desk. Then the guard moves in the direction of the arrow that says "Guard". If you roll the police badge when the guard is awake, he'll be sent back to his desk. If you roll the dog collar, the dog wakes up and is placed on the "Dog Awake" space just outside his kennel. Then the dog moves in the direction of the arrow that says "Dog". If you roll the dog collar when the dog is awake, he'll go back to sleep in his kennel. You cannot be caught if the guard or the dog are on their Awake space, or if the player is on the Out of Jail space. The guard and the dog must move first before the agents and cannot see or smell inside rooms.

=== Tools ===
There are 8 rooms outlined in red. Each one has a booby trap in it. You'll need to use one of the tool cards to disarm a booby trap and uncover the secret tile below it. This table shows which tool disarms which booby trap.

Boogy trap	Tool
Poison gas	Gas mask
Killer bees	Aerosol spray
Heat sensor	Ice suit
Barbed wire	Wire strippers
Laser web	Deflection mirror
Glass box	Sledgehammer
Ring of fire	Robot
10 tons	Two agents

Some tools do not disarm booby traps but have other uses.

Tool	Use
Telephone	Sends the guard back to his desk.
Doggie treats	Sends the dog back to his kennel.
Radar jammer	Moves the guard backwards.
Whistle	Moves the dog backwards.
Rocket-powered skateboard	Doubles your roll.
Swiss army knife	Opens the jail.

Tools can only be used once in the game.

=== Secret Tiles ===
There are four kinds of secret tile. There are four key tiles, which you use to open the safe. There are also two "secret passage" tiles, which lead to two of the rooms on the board (both Data Storages) that have secret passages in them. Also, one tile is there to stun you (which means you miss a turn) and there is also one empty tile.

=== Jail ===
You will be sent to jail if the path between you and the guard is completely straight, or if there are at most 5 spaces between you and the dog. If a player is sent to jail, they may not rejoin the game unless they hold the Swiss army knife card, or roll the "jail release" (open padlock) symbol on the 12-sided die, or be bumped off by another player arriving at one of the three "jail release" rooms to free whoever is in jail. If a player is freed from jail, their game token must be put on the "out of jail" space immediately outside the jail.

Once all four keys have been found, all agents must return to the central room. Once they do so, the keys are turned in the slot and the game is won (you will hear the sound of the four keys followed by a Moog synthesizer version of the 1812 Overture). The game is lost if and only if time runs out (as players who are in jail still roll the die/dice.

== Development ==
Mattel developed Break the Safe using extensive market research and feedback from parents. Interviews revealed a desire for games that finish quickly and avoid causing arguments among children. In response, Mattel designed Break the Safe as a cooperative game where players work together to stop a world-ending plot before a 30-minute timer runs out. Feedback emphasized that parents wanted a game that fit easily into family routines—something that could be played after dinner and wrapped up before bedtime.

Ice-T partnered with Mattel to launch Break the Safe, as a family board game promoting teamwork and communication as a social alternative to video games, which Ice-T humorously linked to his past experiences with real safes.

== Reception ==
Sam Sheryll (12 years old in 2003) for Newsday said that "It's a lot of fun, and I enjoyed playing against time instead of people for a change. It makes you feel like you have to speed your playing up."

Gold Coast Bulletin described the game as "a race against time that will have you transfixed."

== Other uses ==
Sivasailam Thiagarajan of Workshops by Thiagi Inc. used Break the Safe in corporate training in 2003, noting that the game became effective when paired with discussions on team-building theory and participants' behavior under competitive pressure.
