= Thingmaker =

Craft toy by Mattel

- Other names: Creepy Crawlers
- Type: Art and Craft molding
- Company: Mattel; ToyMax; Jakks Pacific
- Availability: 1964–present

Thingmaker, also called Creepy Crawlers, is an activity toy made by Mattel, beginning in 1964. The toy consists of a series of die-cast metal molds resembling various bug-like creatures, into which is poured a liquid chemical substance called "Plasti-Goop", which comes in assorted colours. The mould is then heated to about 390 °F (200 °C) in an open-face electric hot plate oven. The Plasti-Goop is cured by the heat, and when cooled forms semi-solid, rubbery replicas which can be removed from the mould.

== Concept ==
The concept of the Thingmaker was introduced in 1963, as part of Mattel's Vac-U-Maker set. This omnibus toy combined the new moulds and Plasti-Goop technology with the existing Vac-U-Form machine, a vacuum forming toy, which molded simple sculptures by heating thin sheets of plastic, then using a vacuum pump to form the softened plastic over hard plastic forms. Following this introduction period, the Thingmaker portion was spun off as a separate set, and launched as the "Creepy Crawlers" line.

Mattel packaged molds from various sets to be sold separately, and also combined molds into larger omnibus editions, encompassing several themes into one set, under names such as "Triple Thingmaker", "Super Thingmaker" and "Every Thingmaker". Mattel marketed numerous Thingmaker sets as follow-ups to the original "Creepy Crawlers" throughout the 1960s, using various themes aimed at both boys and girls, as well as exclusive single mould sets, including Superman and Tarzan, and original concepts including "Squirtles" and "Gangly Danglies".

== Varieties of Thingmaker mould sets ==
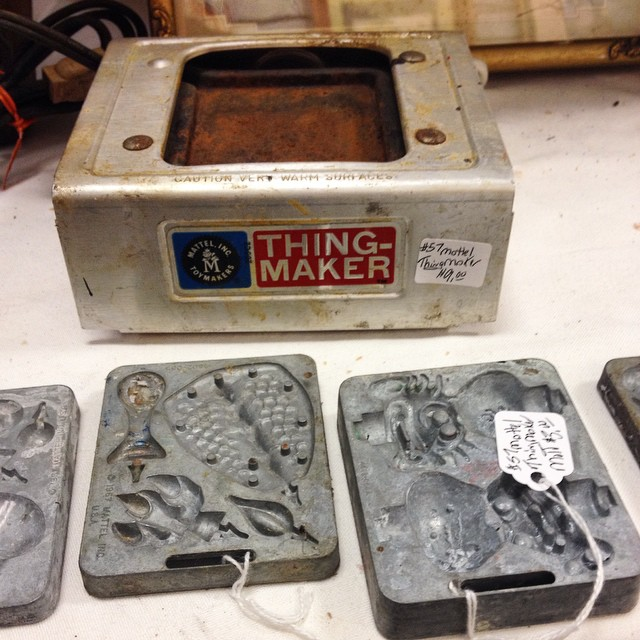
Vintage Mattel Thingmaker toy with aluminum molds, c. 1967

- Giant Creepy Crawlers (1965): This set featured nine moulds (as did the original "Creepy Crawlers"), but these new moulds featured just one giant creature apiece.
- Fighting Men (1965): This set of six moulds could be used to create mini soldier figures, using an innovative two-part mould to give the Fighting Men a front and a back. The set also included pieces of wire to place in the figure, making it bendable with the bottom wire protrusions being able to stand on a styrofoam base. Other moulds in the set created weaponry and equipment for the Fighting Men to carry into battle.
- Creeple Peeple (1965): This five-mould set formed strange heads, arms and feet. When assembled onto a pencil, they formed weird, Troll-like creatures.
- Fun Flowers (1966): Seven moulds full of different styles and shapes of flowers and leaves, for use in decorating and design.
- Fright Factory (1966): Five of this set's seven moulds were dedicated to creepy disguises, making pieces such as fake scars, snaggled teeth, or a third eye for one's forehead. Another mould (with a special insert) made a shrunken head, and the last made a dangly skeleton that one built from parts.
- Incredible Edibles (1967) : A Thingmaker that made edible pieces. It used a special goop called "Gobble De-goop" which was placed in molds and cooked like regular Plasti-Goop.
- Picadoos (1967): A Thingmaker for artists. This one featured moulds with 10x10-space numbered grids. By carefully placing coloured Plasti-Goop in the grid, one could create decorative artwork in either beads, mosaic tile, or cross-stitch varieties.
- Mini-Dragons (1967): The eight moulds in this set formed wings, horns, claws, tails, and other body parts, which could be combined into various fantasy creatures.
- Eeeeks! (1968): In the same vein as Mini-Dragons, this set of eight moulds formed several varieties of mix-and-match legs, bodies, heads, wings, antennae, etc., to create large, bizarre insects.
- Zoofie-Goofies (1968): Seven moulds form heads, bodies and feet of various animals, from cats and dogs to elephants and lions.
- Hot Wheels Factory (1969): Moulds made two piece bodies that fit together with wheels embedded into the bottom mould so you could make your own Hot Wheels cars.
- DollyMaker (1969): Five two-sided moulds are used to create two styles of little dolls, and a wardrobe of late '60s fashions and accessories for them.
- Super Cartoon Maker (1969): A licensed Thingmaker, the eight moulds in this set form replicas of Charles Schulz's Peanuts characters, such as Snoopy, Charlie Brown and Lucy.
- Jillions of Jewels (1970): The last of the classic Mattel Thingmakers. The set had five moulds, but instead of the liquid Plasti-Goop, these formed solid plastic "gemstones" and jewelry frames from two kinds of powdered "Jewel Dust" compounds.

In 1973 the newly created Consumer Product Safety Commission took over the regulation of toys from the Food and Drug Administration. New safety regulations were issued concerning toys that used heat. According to Peter Davis, product safety manager for Mattel, "Although the Thing-Maker (which involved dropping plastic into heated molds) was heralded by educators as a terrific educational toy, it was discontinued because it used heat."

In 1978 Mattel released an updated (and safer) model of their "Creepy Crawlers" toy. Called the "Thingmaker II", this version used a very differently formulated Plasti-Goop, and used plastic moulds, into which was poured the heated Plasti-Goop. In this set one heated the Plasti-Goop and poured it into the green plastic mould(s) to cool; the moulds were not put into the heater, which looked like a small cauldron. The reformulated Plasti-Goop did not work well and the process of making bugs, etc. with these sets was typically slow, taking an hour or so to make a creation. These sets did not sell as well as their predecessors, and the attempted revival was a short-lived one. Only two sets were produced—Creepy Crawlers and Flower Fun.

== ToyMax revival ==
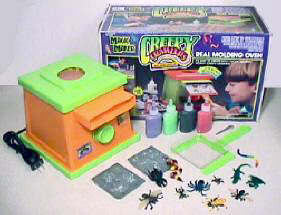
An early version of the ToyMax "Magic Maker" Creepy Crawlers Oven Set

After being out of production for more than a decade, the "Creepy Crawlers" brand was brought back in 1992 by a New York-based company called ToyMax. With much stricter safety regulations in place, the new version of the Creepy Crawlers set re-introduced the metal moulds and earlier Plasti-Goop-type formulation, but now used a lightbulb-powered "Magic Maker" heater, with a heat-triggered door designed to remain closed until the mould had cooled sufficiently to be handled safely.

The name "Magic Maker", as well as the new oven design, were borrowed from an earlier 1980s-era toy that melted clear coloured plastic granules to form sun catcher window decorations. Over the next five years new mould designs were released as well as new mould packs. Apparently Mattel, the originator of Creepy Crawlers, had let its trademarks lapse, for many of the original Mattel concepts were revisited, such as "Creeple Peeple", "Mini-Dragons", "Eeeks" (ToyMax changed the spelling), and "DollyMaker". Numerous licenses were also employed, resulting in mould designs featuring such characters as Bugs Bunny, The Mighty Morphin Power Rangers, Batman, Woody, Buzz Lightyear, Rex, Hamm and the Green Army Men from Toy Story, and The Mask. The new formula Plasti-Goop had an array of colours, and several varieties, including

- Glow In the Dark Plasti-Goop
- Scented Glamour-Goop
- Glitter Glamour-Goop
- Stretch Plasti-Goop
- Metallic Plasti-Goop
- Colour Change Plasti-Goop
- Plasti-Steel (Rigid-Goop for use in toy car bodies)
- Eraser Plasti-Goop.

Toward the end of the ToyMax run, the oven was redesigned to incorporate a fold-down hinged door, and required less at-home assembly. Releases of new mould packs became more and more sporadic over time. In 1997, a wave of moulds (and a new oven set) based on the second Jurassic Park film, and an original line of "Mutant Squad" Plasti-Goop-based figures (three of the six planned "Mutants" were never released) heralded the end of another era of "Thingmaking", and the beginning of a third period of hiatus. In 2001, ToyMax tried again, with both a "Creepy Crawlers" and a "DollyMaker" line, but this revival was brief.

== After ToyMax ==
After Toymax, a third company, Jakks Pacific, based in California, began producing Creepy Crawlers toys. Though most of the Jakks Pacific line are re-issued mould designs from the extensive ToyMax offerings, they have also marketed new character moulds featuring SpongeBob SquarePants and Hello Kitty. New releases of oven sets and mould packs have been intermittent. Christmas 2006 saw release of three "new" mould designs by Jakks Pacific, though the numbering of these moulds suggests they be previously unreleased designs from the ToyMax era.

In 2007, Jakks Pacific released a Pokémon-themed Creepy Crawlers Oven and Mould Paks, and in late 2008, another Oven Set based on the Star Wars: Clone Wars license was released, again in time for Christmas.

In the Autumn of 2010, Toys "R" Us stores released a line of exclusive "Creepy Crawlers" Activity Toys (produced by Jakks-Pacific) that use injection moulding and hollow, two-sided moulds to create bugs and spiders in solid, wall-crawling and gut-filled "squishable" varieties. Reviews on the Toys "R" Us site indicate numerous problems with the moulds leaking in the Creepy Crawlers injector models.

As of Spring 2012, the once-exclusive Jakks-Pacific "Creepy Crawlers" sets and refill accessories were available at other outlets, such as K-Mart and Target.

== Cancelled 3D printer ==
In 2016, Mattel announced a new version of the ThingMaker, a 3D printer line. Its release was originally scheduled for Autumn 2016 and later pushed to 2017. When the printer wasn't released, Mattel replied to a Twitter comment on November 20, 2017, saying plans for the 3D printer version were under review, and a firm release date was not set and updates would be posted on their website. Since then, the website went offline. In another Twitter reply, on March 28, 2019, it was noted that Mattel had apologized, having discontinued and cancelled the project.

== In other media ==
=== Television show ===
ToyMax developed their own entertainment property based on the Creepy Crawlers concept, which became a Saturday morning cartoon — the series lasted two seasons (23 episodes, including one unaired episode that later saw release on video) and a line of 12 action figures that each came with a metal mould, with which to make unique accessories for the figures.

=== Film adaptation ===
In May 2018, it was announced that a film based on Creepy Crawlers is in development. The film rights were acquired by Paramount Pictures. It's scheduled to be produced by Paramount Players and Original Film. The upcoming film's producers include Neal H. Moritz, Marc Gurvitz and Toby Ascher. Stephen Berman, chairman and CEO of JAKKS Pacific, will serve as executive producer.
