= Pixel Chix =

Handheld electronic game

- Developer: Mattel
- Publisher: Mattel
- Platform: Handheld electronic device
- Genre: Life simulation game
- Mode: Single-player

Pixel Chix was a handheld life simulation video game released by Mattel in 2005. The game was set in a dollhouse and was centered around interactions with a digital girl. Gameplay included feeding her, playing games, dressing up her, going out, and putting her to bed every night. New items and activities were unlockable through in-game progression.

Mattel released other games in the Pixel Chix series, including Roomies, a life simulator featuring six characters living in a three-story apt complex, as well as a babysitting simulator and a pet simulator. Canadian-US actress Tara Strong voices all of the characters in Pixel Chix, except for Miss Sporty, who is voiced by Katherine Von Till.

Each house includes a lounge, kitchen and dining area, and steps leading upstairs. The first line of houses includes a cottage, mansion, and loft, and a different girl inhabits each. The 2-Story House variant allows the player to view and access the second story, but only includes a cottage and loft. Each house also comes in different colors including blue, pink and yellow. A unique purple loft was released only in Europe. Fitted at the bottom sides of every house are USB-like plug-ins that connect the houses together that allows different Pixel Chix to visit and interact with each other.

Pixel Chix were successful upon release, forming an important part of Mattel's earnings that year. In 2009, Mattel discontinued the brand, but Pixel Chix remained on the Everythinggirl.com website for six years until the website shut down in 2015.

== Premise ==
In the game, two or more houses can be connected, allowing the characters (the Pixel Chix) to visit one another. These characters can be controlled in ways similar to other handheld games, such as the Asian Tamagotchi. They can be told to go for a walk, watch TV, eat a variety of foods, such as popcorn and hamburgers , and go to sleep every night.

The more they are played with, the more options appear to the player; higher levels introduce different types of food, more fashion and more games to play. If they are ignored, they will decrease in skill level. Eventually, if ignored for too long, the game will "end" by causing the characters to "leave", although they can come back by resetting the game using a miniature screwdriver into a reset hole.

The story is based and shown on the virtual site of teenage girls living in an all-female education and stylish poses, beginning with a house, then friend's connection and following with cars and babysitting.

== Variations and items ==
A number of Pixel Chix accessories have been created including the "Road Trippin' Cars" where one can go to the mall, go to the beach, or do many other things. The cars come in several different colors. There are also metallic Road Trippin' Cars and a glitter house that were only released in Europe.

Also available is the Pixel Chix Love 2 Shop mall, where the Pixel Chix can work, shop, play games, and take breaks. There are two different malls, a boutique/food court, and a pet shop/salon. Each mall has an LCD flip screen, allowing the Pixel Chix girl to change stores. They are able to connect to the houses, cars, and other malls.

Another available item is the Pixel Chix two-story house. It is almost the exact replica of the original Pixel Chix except that it has an upstairs bedroom. There, the Pixel Chix can put on makeup at the boudoir, go to the bathroom, and much more. They come in dark and light pink and are connectable to the cars, malls, along other houses. Here, no matter how long she is forsaken, the Pixel Chix girl remains joyful in the player's house with the player's level skills kept unchanged.

There is also Pixel Pets (Secret Life of Pets, not related to Universal animated film of same name) in which pets can start becoming disco stars, the animal equivalent of Pixel Chix. Dogs and hamsters are available.

Also available is a babysitting house where the Pixel Chix seeks after a toddler girl. The red light flashes if something is wrong or needs attention.

There is the "Roomies" House with three floors (six rooms in all) with five different roommates - Diva Queen, DJ Hip Hop, Punk Rocker, Super Smarty and Miss Sporty - who are all sold separately, except for Miss Sporty, who comes with the Roomies house.

There is a Pixel Chix TV, which comes with a remote control to switch channels and also unlock channels.

The last Pixel Chix product to be released was the "Fab Life City" where the Pixel Chix girl can go to the bank, mall and theme park. There is also a piggy bank which can hold coins.

McDonald's Happy Meal toys based on the line were released in 2008 in several regions, including Portugal, France, and Oceania.

== Specification ==
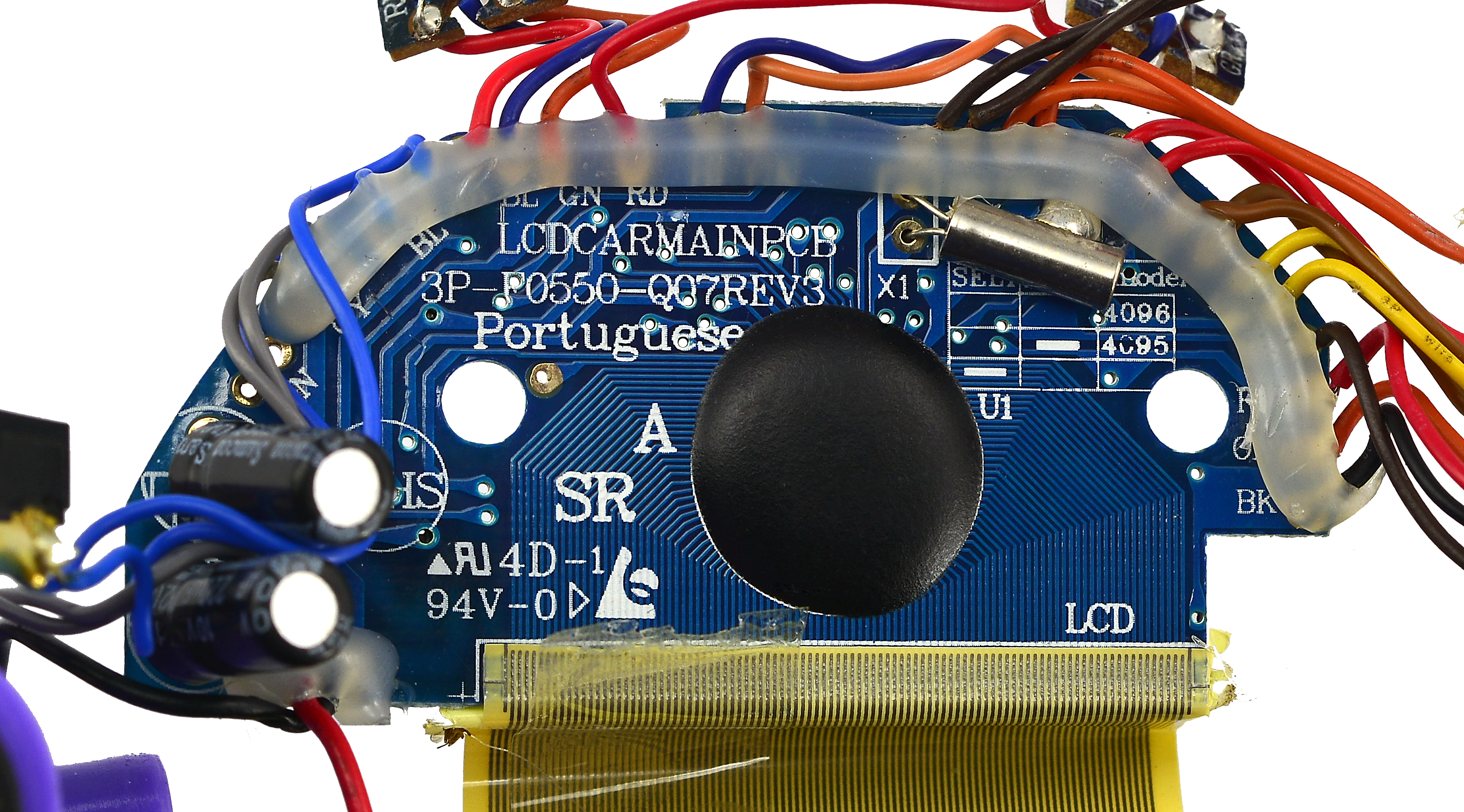
Motherboard of a Road Trippin' car showing main processor and language

The toys have an LCD screen display of various sizes, and are powered by four AAA alkaline batteries, while the cars use only 3 AAA batteries.

Since they were distributed in several countries, the voices of the characters were translated depending on where they were sold, being printed on the motherboard what language is programmed onto the ROM of the machine.

== Website ==
There was an official website of Pixel Chix on Everythinggirl.com. There were online games, such as "Monster Baby" and four mini-games which could be unlocked, videos of TV commercials, T-shirt graphics, a downloadable desktop sidekick, as well as secret codes and a movie maker similar to that of Zimmer Twins. The website closed in 2014 along with the My Scene website.
