= Strange Change Machine =

The Strange Change Machine was a Mattel toy introduced in 1968, in which "shape memory" plastic figures of prehistoric animals and science fiction-like creatures could be reconstituted from compressed "time capsule" form, and re-compressed back into that form. The label on the box read, "A Strange Change Toy featuring The Lost World," suggesting that perhaps this was the first of a proposed series. The "Lost World" was the only scenario produced with this toy before it was discontinued due to safety concerns.

== Description ==
The play set consisted of:

- The Strange Change Machine -- constructed of a red metal base and a domed "Expansion Chamber," with a heating element at the bottom, a "Pre-Heat Area," for warming the capsules, and the "Compressor," a hand-cranked screw-press for re-compressing the figures into nondescript blocks with the Mattel logo restamped on the surface. Some editions had a label on the side declaring the device a "Time Machine."
- (16) Time Capsules -- the plastic squares, which became the various dinosaurs, monsters, robots, "Astropods", and "Creaturelings", such as the Membrain Man, who strangely enough made an appearance in a Fantastic Four comic drawn by Arthur Adams.
- (1) pair of plastic tweezers.
- Instructions printed on a fold-out, color "Landscape Map of the Lost World," which took the form of a primordial forest surrounded by a volcanic mountain range.
- A 3-D green plastic base -- listed in the instructions as the "Home for Lost World Creatures" and resembling the landscape printed on the back of the instruction sheet. The base also served to hold the machine in place in the box.

To reconstitute a figure, one would first pre-heat the "capsule" on the side of the machine, then place it into the heating chamber and close the door. Over the course of a few minutes, the plastic would soften enough for the original shape of the figure to reassert itself, and it would slowly open up into that shape. (Tweezers were provided for removing the still-hot figure.)

To compress a figure back into "time capsule" form, one would place the figure into the heating chamber, until it began to sag slightly, then remove it with the tweezers, stuff it into the open press, close the press chamber lid and crank the press. After a few minutes, the compressed figure would cool down to room temperature and retain its compressed shape.

== How it worked ==
The process is similar to the way heat shrink tubing works: in the case of the tubing, it is molded in its "shrunk" size, cross-linked (usually by exposure to certain types of radiation, such as electron beams) to convert it to a thermoset, then reheated and stretched. In the case of Strange Change figures, the figure was molded (in what appears to have been polyethylene), exposed to electron beams to cross-link it by Raychem, coated with a long-lasting release agent to keep it from sticking to itself when compressed, then (in much the same process described above, only with power equipment) compressed into "time capsule" form.

== Retail pricing ==
The toy was regularly priced in 1968 and 1969 in the United States at roughly $9.99 to $11.88 but could be found on sale for $6.99 or $7.99.
