= Boglins =

Rubber hand puppet toy line

Boglin
- Type: Hand puppets
- Invented by: Tim Clarke, Maureen Trotto, Larry Mass
- Company: Mattel; TriAction Toys
- Country: United States
- Availability: 1987–present

Boglins are a series of toy puppets originally distributed by Mattel. They were created by Tim Clarke, Maureen Trotto, and Larry Mass, and licensed by Seven Towns. The original run of Boglins was released in 1987, coinciding with a "creatures" craze that included Ghoulies, Critters, and Gremlins. Boglins were goblin-themed hand puppets made of flexible rubber and could be manipulated to represent speech and facial expressions.

Several series of large and small Boglins were released until 1994, with additional aquatic, Halloween, and baby themed Boglins released later into the line. Small solid 'Mini-Boglins' were also produced, akin to the Kinkeshi figures also from the 1980s. The line was relaunched by TriAction Toys beginning in 2020.

== Original Boglins toys ==
Created by Jim Henson Company alumni Tim Clarke, Maureen Trotto and Larry Mass for the Seven Towns company in 1987, Boglins were initially brought to Coleco as a potential addition to their Sectaurs line; but were eventually marketed on their own by Mattel in 1987. The three original large scale Boglins were Dwork, Vlobb and Drool (Vlobb and Drool were called Plunk and Flurp in the UK), and were packaged in unique wooden crate-like boxes with bent plastic jail-bars.

Although sporting small arms and a tail, these puppets mostly consisted of a large goblin-like head, drawing some inspiration from the giant Olmec heads of Ancient Mexico. Constructed from an artificial rubber known as Kraton, the initial models also featured glow in the dark eyes, which could be moved using a lever hidden inside the puppets, as well as the ability to wink/blink via a small plastic tab above each eye.

Unlike many toylines of the 1980s there was no accompanying cartoon series or comic book for Boglins, with a backstory only mentioned in the "Bogologist Field Notes" on the back of the packaging. The notes establish the science of "Bogology", detailing how the creatures originated from a "swampy bog that time forgot", possibly a "missing link" to human personalities. The first release of large creatures were given the species name Boglinus Humungus.

Smaller Boglins (a subspecies known as Boglinus minimus), named Squidge, Shlump, Shlurp, Sponk, Squawk, and Squeel were also early releases into the line (in the UK these names were changed to Squit, Boink, Splatt, Blap, Klang, and Doink respectively). Lasting only two years in the United States, Boglins proved to be a bigger hit within the United Kingdom, distributed by the toy companies Ideal and Action GT.

Other later Boglins included "Talking Boglins" (Glint and Kwirk), Aquatic-themed "Soggy Boglins" (Snish the Fish, Slogg the Frog, and Slobster the Lobster), "Halloween Boglins" (Blobkin and Bog o' Bones), "Glow Boglins" (Klang, Doink, and Squit), "Action Boglins" (Rasp, Gunge, Likk, Iball, and Spit), "Bash'em Boglins" (Splat and Skwish), and re-releases of the original larger Boglins: Dwork, Flurp, and Plunk, now including hair and "wiggly tongues".

"Baby Boglins" were also produced, much smaller in size serving more as finger puppets as opposed to the full-sized hand puppets. These came inside of small plastic eggs and included Blap, Boink, Squit, Klang, Doink, Splat, Cratch, Flop, Lurp, Mork, Snot, and Suk; Boink, Klang, and Squit also came in "Baby Action Boglins" variants. Other variations included small hard-plastic "Caged" Boglins, as well as "Acrobat Boglins" made from a sticky elastomer similar to the octopus-shaped Wacky WallWalkers of the same era.

== Mini Boglins ==
Mini Boglins were first released in 1991 by Ideal. They were solid PVC with no movable parts (similar to Monster in My Pocket and M.U.S.C.L.E.), and were sold in randomized blister packs of 3, 5, 10, or 20 figures. With over 100 distinct figures of varying color-schemes, Mini Boglins were usable in a Boglins-themed game, that assigned various ranks to the figures, and divided them into 12 different tribes.

Many models featured "secret battle code symbols" with in-game utility that would appear after it was heated and left to cool. There were also "Slime Boglins" that were Mini Boglins sold in plastic toilets filled with toy slime, a Mini Boglins Swamp carry case that unfolded to resemble a small landscape, a mail-away Mini Boglins cage and an additional 13th Mini Boglins tribe, "The Cool Dudes", only released in packages of Kellogg's Frosties in the UK.

== Re-released Boglins ==
Mattel relaunched the Boglins line in 2000 through Lansay, Awesome Toys and Vivid Imagination with two new series of puppets: large, electronic ones that talked, and several smaller ones that stuck out their tongues or spat water when squeezed. In 2016 there was a Boglin art show in New York by Clutter Arts featuring a Boglin mold painted by multiple artists. Boglins made a return in 2017 under a licensing deal with Seven Towns and Clutter Magazine in limited run batches to the collector's market.

In 2020, co-creator Tim Clarke, licensor Seven Towns, and Surge Licensing reached a deal with TriAction Toys to relaunch the line, funded through a Kickstarter campaign that raised $274,000. The relaunch reissued the three original large Boglins as King Dwork, King Drool, and King Vlobb, which shipped to Kickstarter backers and specialty retailers in 2021. In 2022, TriAction introduced the Bat Boglins Drak, Vlad, and Orlock, the first characters in the line with wings.
