= What's Her Face (doll) =

Line of fashion dolls by Mattel

What's Her Face!
- WHF dolls, fltr: Glam, Hip, Sweet, and Cool
- Type: Fashion dolls
- Company: Mattel
- Country: United States
- Availability: 2001–2003

What's Her Face! was a line of customizable dolls that straddled the line between traditional fashion dolls and creative activity toys. Made by Mattel, the line ran from 2001–2003, and enjoyed only a modest success in a market dominated by Mattel's iconic Barbie and MGA Entertainment's Bratz dolls. Following the discontinuation of the What's Her Face! line, their body molds were used for the Wee 3 Friends line of Barbie-related dolls. Several fashion, wig, and activity packs were also released for the What's Her Face line.

== Features ==
The standard What's Her Face Dolls are approximately 9.5" tall. Their most recognizable feature is a large round head with no facial features. The Doll's completely blank face is intended to be drawn on and designed by the owner, using included washable colored markers and if desired, special rubber stamps of eyes and mouths. A flower-shaped mask was also included, with corresponding holes to help align the stamps on the Doll's face. The Doll's oversized head lacks rooted hair, and has velcro on top, designed to help their changeable brightly colored wigs stay in place. The Doll's body is similarly stylized, approaching a nearly cartoonish pre-teen build with large, flat feet, which allow the Doll to stand on her own. Many of the Dolls sport molded-on floral-print panties, but the earliest Dolls did not, this feature being added midway through the line's run.

== Product lines ==
=== Wave One: 2001 ===
This initial wave introduced the What's Her Face concept with the release of Four Dolls:

Glam, as her name implies, is the fashionista of the group. She has the palest skin of the Dolls in the line. The first edition "Glam" had changeable hot pink and blue wigs, and wore a reversible zebra-print mini skirt, (a possible reason for the addition of the molded panties later) and silver platform boots.

Sweet has the most artistic personality, and usually wears pink. Her debut edition had a bright red waist length wig, and a yellow wig with pigtails.

Hip likes music, and has a medium complexion. She had a medium-length, side-parted green wig and a pink wig with pigtails, and she wore bell-bottoms/capris and a reversible T-Shirt.

Cool is the sporty girl. She has the darkest skin of the Dolls in the line. She had a long straight orange wig with bangs and a purple wig tied in low pigtails. "Cool" wore an ensemble of a T-shirt and cargos that shortened to hot pants.

=== "Head 2 Toe" Dolls: 2002 ===
In 2002, Mattel expanded on the line with the "Head 2 Toe" What's Her Face Dolls. The same four characters were revisited with new looks and a few new gimmicks. The "Head 2 Toe" Dolls each came with only one wig, but it was streaked with contrasting colors that changed with the application of cold water. The Dolls' change-around clothing were all made with washable fabrics, so that the same markers used to decorate her face could be used to draw designs on her clothing as well.

The line consisted of:

- "City Glam" in yellow snakeskin pants
- "School Hip" in a red vinyl slacks and T-shirt outfit
- "Party Sweet" whose pink party gear included a floor-length ball gown skirt

and

- "Beach Cool", in a pink bikini with blue cover up skirt.

Later in the year, extra editions of two of the characters, "Evening Out Glam" in a reversible blue-to-pink mini dress and "Shopping Sweet" in trendy capris and bustier top, arrived as case refreshers.

=== "What's Her Look": 2003 ===
The "What's Her Look" line of 2003 seemed to have experienced a very limited release, and was the last line available in the United States. Glam, Hip, Sweet and Cool were now known as Wild, Retro, Fresh, and Chic respectively. These Dolls were about an inch taller, and much slimmer than their predecessors, though still with the large flat feet. In addition to their simple outfit and their single, glitter-streaked wig, these Dolls also came with a multi-patterned tube of stretchy fabric and a pair of scissors. The tube could be cut and customized into any number of unique clothing items for the Doll.

=== Fab Faces ===
A fourth wave of What's Her Face Dolls were marketed in Europe and South America after the cancellation of the line in the United States. These Dolls, called "Fab Faces" (a name which was later used for a line of "My Scene" Barbie-related dolls), were seen at the New York Toy Fair in 2003, and appeared in the Mattel 2003 Toy Catalog, but were thought for a time to be unreleased. Instead of the stamps and markers used for previous lines, these Dolls had a traditionally painted face, and came with three different snap-on face masks sporting different expressions. By pushing a button on the back of the Doll's head, You could change the color and position of her eyes, much like the famous Blythe doll. The "Fab Faces" Dolls had added articulation at the elbows and knees, and an improved hip joint that allowed them to cross their legs when seated. They each came with two streaked wigs, and their costumes could be decorated by using small button-like beads to add rows of lace, fur, or fringe. Only three "Fab Faces" Dolls were produced, called "Twinkle Eyes", "Dreamy Eyes", and "Stylin' Eyes". There was no dark-skinned Doll available.

=== Unreleased Items ===
In the 2003 Mattel Toy Catalog, alongside the "What's Her Look!" and "Fab Faces" waves of What's Her Face dolls, there was a refreshed line of "Original" What's Her Face dolls featured. These dolls were not commercially released. The Four Dolls aren't named in the text, but they correspond visually to Hip, Glam, Cool, and Sweet, while having all-new styles of wigs, outfits, and accessories. Also unreleased accessory packs for this discontinued wave included a wig 2-Pack, a pack of replacement markers and face stamps (similar to a released item from the "What's Her Look!" wave), and a single extra fashion with shoes. As mentioned below, a member of the "What's Her Baby!" line-up, "Stylin' Steps", was deleted from the assortment after similarly appearing in the 2003 Mattel Catalog.

=== Clothing ===
As the line is meant to spark creativity in young children, most of the clothes are customizable in some manner. The clothing worn by the First Edition 2001 Dolls were reversible, or changeable by adding or removing pieces (extra Pants Legs, for example). The 2002 "Head 2 Toe" Dolls' clothing got even more creative: not only did the clothing transform, they were made of materials that could be drawn on and decorated, much like the Doll's faces. A line of Four Extra Outfits were also available, including Pajamas, a Raincoat and Boots, a Swimsuit, and a Silver Party Dress, all of which could be customized and cleaned over and over. The 2003 "What's Her Look" Dolls (who wore painted-on bikinis) went even further with the customization possibilities: in addition to one simple outfit, they came with a long, multi-patterned tube of fabric and a pair of scissors. These tubes could be cut into any number of unique tank tops and dresses and skirts for the Dolls. A few other doll lines can share most clothing with What's Her Face, including:

- Wee 3 Friends
- Bratz Boyz (female Bratz cannot wear the same size clothes, however)
- Teen Skipper

Some Barbie clothes (particularly shirts) can loosely fit as well.

=== Gift Sets ===
There were also two special edition Gift Sets: "What A Day!", a Christmas Themed Set in 2001, that came with three wigs and three changes of clothing, and "What's Her Adventure" from 2002, a Safari-inspired Set, that came with a re-arrangeable "Whatever" Pet. Both of these Gift Sets were available with either a dark-skinned or light-skinned "What's Her Face" Doll. Also released was a "What's Her Face" CD-ROM where the user can play as Hip, Glam, Cool and Sweet, the user can choose clothing, locations, music, moves sound effects and props.

== Spin-off lines ==
- What's Her Baby?: A line of two toddler-type dolls with rooted hair instead of a wig. Kissy Face has rubber-stamping lips that extend from the face by way of a lever in the back. The lips could also be traded for a pacifier. Pixie Do has a long braid that extended and retracted from the top of the head. Both dolls were only available with light skin. A third "What's Her Baby?" character, "Stylin' Steps", was at least planned, for she appeared on the (now-defunct) whatsherface.com Website, and in the 2003 Mattel Toy Catalog, but was evidently never produced.
- "Whatever" Pet: Comes with multiple sets of snap-on ears and tails to create the appearance of different animals.
- There was also a playset, "What's Her Space?", full of two- and three-way transformable furniture (a chair became a TV, the couch became a bathtub became a bed, etc.), and a What's Her Face Tote Bag, which was a Toys "R" Us exclusive giveaway in 2002 with purchase of a Doll.

== In popular culture ==
Despite the limited success of the "What's Her Face" line, the dolls had at least one "clone" or "copycat" line based on their likeness. This was the South American "Eyes & Faces" Doll, which used a head which was identical to the eye-changing "Fab Faces" Dolls, down to exactly the same decos on the copy's three masks. The "Eyes & Faces" Doll used a low-quality Barbie-type body (noticeably taller than a "What's Her Face"), and wore bootleg versions of "My Scene" footwear, to give the illusion of "What's Her Face" sized feet. The doll's box is not dated, and wisely, no company name is given, but it must have been released in 2003, the time of the "Fab Faces" release, or shortly thereafter.

A sketch revolving around the What's Her Face dolls was made in the season 11 episode "May Cause Numb Butthole" of the Adult Swim series Robot Chicken.
