= Handler =

Handler or The Handler may refer to:

== People ==
=== Occupations ===
- Handler, offensive player in Ultimate (sport)
- Animal handler, person who conducts animal training or is a wrangler
- Handler, a sport coach, agent or promoter
- Agent handling, person who manages a spy or agent of organizations in conflict such as nations and even groups and gangs involved in crusades, jihad, mass organized conversion rackets, etc.
- Baggage handler, a person who loads and unloads baggage and other cargo for transport via aircraft
- Mail handler, a postal worker
- Aircraft handler, a branch of the Fleet Air Arm/Royal Navy
- Garter handler, an old term for a pimp
- Political handler, an advisor and supporter of a politician
- Händler, a merchant in German

=== People named Handler ===
- Carole Handler, American attorney
- Chelsea Handler, American comedian and talk show host
- Daniel Handler, American author and musician
- Elliot Handler, American inventor and business magnate
- Evan Handler, American actor
- Evelyn Handler, 17th president of the University of New Hampshire
- Kenneth Handler, American screenwriter, director, and film composer
- Phil Handler, American football player and coach
- Rebecca Handler, American/Japanese actress
- Rich Handler, American businessman
- Ruth Handler, American businesswoman

=== People named Händler ===
- Andrea Händler, Austrian actress and cabaret artist
- Jack Martin Händler, Slovak conductor and violinist
- Wolfgang Händler, German computer scientist

== Computing ==
- A20 handler, the IBM PC memory manager software controlling access to the High Memory Area
- Event handler, a function for processing a programming event
- Exception handling, a function for handling a software exception
- Interrupt handler, a function for processing an interrupt
- Signal handler, a function for handling a signal sent to a process

== Machines ==
- Air handler, a device used as part of an HVAC (Heating, Ventilating, and Air Conditioning) system
- Handler, a robotic device used to automatically place a device under test into an automatic test equipment system
- Seismic Handler, an interactive analysis program for preferably continuous waveform data
- Telescopic handler, a machine widely used in agriculture and industry

== Arts and entertainment ==
- "The Handler", a short story by Ray Bradbury
- Handler (play), by Robert Schenkkan
- The Handler (Har Mar Superstar album), the third CD from American singer Har Mar Superstar
- Handler, a character class in Dragonlance
- The Handler (TV series)
- "The Handler", a song by British rock-band Muse on their 2015 album Drones

== See also ==
- Callback (computer programming), for handling a condition
- Hendler
- Wrangler (disambiguation)
