= Hendler =

Hendler is a surname. Notable people with the surname include:

- Daniel Hendler (born 1976), Uruguayan actor
- Herb Hendler (1918–2007), American record producer and lyricist
- James Hendler (born 1957), American artificial intelligence researcher
- Lauri Hendler (born 1965 or 1966), American actor
- Maxwell Hendler (born 1938), American painter
- Raymond Hendler (1923–1998), American artist
- Richard Hendler, American lawyer and professor
- Sheldon Saul Hendler (1936–2012), American scientist, physician and musician
- Stewart Hendler (born 1978), American director
- Talma Hendler (born 1955), Israeli psychiatrist
- Tamaryn Hendler (born 1992), Belgian tennis player

== See also ==
- Handler (disambiguation)
- Cable Bridge (Ed Hendler Bridge)
- Hendler Creamery, historic industrial complex in Jonestown, Baltimore, Maryland
- Hendler v. United States, case of the U.S. Court of Appeals for the Federal Circuit
