= Liddle Kiddles =

Line of dolls by Mattel

Liddle Kiddles were dolls originally produced by toymaker Mattel Inc. in 1965. They were introduced at the New York Toy Fair in 1966 and put on the market soon after. Initially about 3 inches tall, they were small by doll standards. The sensation surrounding the dolls may have influenced other toy companies to produce their own tiny dolls.

Mattel founder Elliot Handler oversaw the project. The dolls were designed to have a close resemblance to those of the little children in neighborhoods across America. Martha Armstrong-Hand at Mattel made the first Kiddles in 1965. The first set of ten dolls in a premier series called "Liddle Kiddles" used only four different head moulds (three of which were sculpted by Martha and one sculpted by another artist) but had different hairstyles and face paint. Martha Armstrong-Hand also sculpted other Mattel dolls, such as Drowsy (1965), Baby First Step (1965) and Cheerful Tearful (1966).

In 1968, Mattel introduced the Liddle Kiddle Talking Town House as a Liddle Kiddle accessory. The Liddle Kiddle Talking Town House contained a Mattel talking voice unit. When the "chatty-ring" was pulled, one of eight different phrases could be heard, such as "This is where the Liddle Kiddles live!" The voice unit was the same as the unit introduced in 1960 inside Mattel's Chatty Cathy doll and used in all the other Mattel talking dolls and toys.

== The doll ==
Kiddles were made of soft vinyl with painted facial features and rooted, brushable hair. The first, second, and third series (called "bigger bodies" by collectors) ranged from 2 3/4 inches to 3 1/2 inches, while the Skediddle Kiddles were 4 inches tall and had a special mechanism inside the body which allowed them to walk, wave, and ride vehicles with the push of a child's hand. The Kola and Kologne Kiddles were 2 inches, and the mini Jewelry Kiddles were 7/8–1 1/16 inches. All the dolls were marked with "Mattel" or "MI", a date, and either "Japan", "Hong Kong" or "Taiwan" on the back of the shoulders or on the back of the head near the hairline. The smaller dolls were marked under their non-removable clothing. Most Kiddle accessories were also marked. Some were marked with the Mattel seal, and some were only marked with a number.

The bigger bodies (the first ten dolls) were designed to resemble typical neighborhood children at play. The name Liddle Kiddles was taken from the words "little kid". Each of the first 24 dolls had detailed clothing and accessories that perfectly matched their theme and size. Wire skeletons inside the vinyl bodies enabled the dolls to be posed and re-posed realistically.

The first series of nine Liddle Kiddle dolls, plus one special doll set, was available only through the Sears and Roebuck Christmas Catalog. It was conceived in 1965 and released to toy shelves in 1966. The following year, additional dolls were added to the Liddle Kiddle series, and the Storybook Kiddles series and Smaller Lucky Locket Kiddle series were introduced. The small 2-inch dolls had no wires inside for posing and, unlike the first 10 and the new Storybook Kiddles, their clothes were not removable. In 1968, the last six additions to the Liddle Kiddles series were added, as well as three more Storybook Kiddles, new Skediddle Kiddles that could walk, the Kologne Kiddle series, and the Jewelry Kiddles.

Mattel designers kept making the dolls smaller and maintained the use of real hair and clothes. Mattel also released a series of four different 2-inch Kiddles that were dressed up in animal costumes and called the Animiddles. Ride and Run Skediddle sets, consisting of a Skediddle walking doll and specially designed riding toys they could also use, were introduced to the Skediddle Kiddle series. Three new Kiddle Kolognes were added. More Lucky Locket Kiddles were released in pretty new pastel locket colors.

1969 saw a new series of 2-inch Storybook Sweetheart Kiddles, portraying star-crossed lovers, such as Romeo and Juliet, and Robin Hood and Maid Marion. Also that year, Mattel introduced the Kozmic Kiddle series of 4 glow-in-the-dark aliens in space ships, the Tea Party Kiddles portraying little girls dressing up as fancy ladies, each coming with a fancy child-sized tea cup and saucer. The Zoolery Kiddles were also released. These were 4 tiny animals about the size of the previous year's Jewelry Kiddles that came in tiny cages that could be worn as Jewelry. There were additional Ride and Run Skediddles added to that series too, and Lucky Locket Kiddles were re-released in bright gold lockets that collectors refer to as "Gold Rush" lockets.

In 1970, a global oil crisis occurred, making plastics, especially vinyl (which is derived from petroleum-based products), more expensive and difficult for toy companies to obtain. Mattel still released some Kiddles that year, but drastic cuts led to Riddlers being discontinued. Many design concepts for new Kiddles and several new series never made it to production.

Paris Langford researched Mattel records to create her Liddle Kiddles value guide, released in 1996. Langford included original concept art and a section showing pictures of prototype dolls that actually were underway at the time that Mattel stopped the line. There were new concepts for fresh Jewelry Kiddle series, some dressed as bumble bees or tiny mermaids. The Bigger Body dolls with wire skeletons had a series underway centered around Circus Performers. Many of these records have since been destroyed, according to Mattel. Paris Langford's value guide now stands as one of the final records of these lost designs that never made it into production.
