= Chatty Cathy =

Pull string "talking" doll

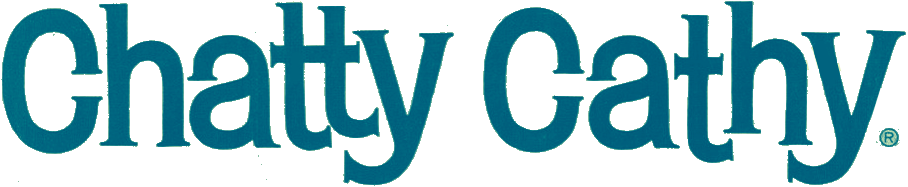
- Type: Doll
- Invented by: Ruth Handler; Elliot Handler
- Company: Mattel
- Country: United States
- Availability: 1959–1965

Chatty Cathy is a pull-string "talking" doll originally created by Ruth and Elliot Handler and manufactured by the Mattel toy company from 1959 to 1965. The doll was first released in stores and appeared in television commercials beginning in 1960, with a suggested retail price of $18.00, though usually priced under $10.00 in catalog advertisements. Chatty Cathy was on the market for six years.

After the success of Chatty Cathy, Mattel introduced "Chatty Baby" in 1962 and "Tiny Chatty Baby", "Tiny Chatty Brother", and "Charmin' Chatty" in 1963. The last doll to have the word "chatty" in its name in the 1960s was "Singin' Chatty" in 1965. Mattel trademarked the name "chatty" in the 1960s, and the boxes for Mattel talking dolls such as Drowsy, Baby Cheryl, and Tatters each had the tag-line "A Chatty Doll by Mattel".

== Physical look ==
The original Chatty Cathy was designed to look like a five-year-old girl with light skin, blue eyes and blonde hair in a short bob. Brunette and auburn-haired versions of the doll were introduced in 1962 and 1963, respectively. An African-American version of the doll with a brown skin tone was also produced in 1962-63.

In 1963, Chatty Cathy's hair was re-styled into what Mattel called "long twin ponytails". Mattel catalogs stated that Chatty Cathy and all the other Chatty dolls had the go-to-sleep, "lifelike decal eyes".

== Voice ==
Although its mouth did not move, the Chatty Cathy doll "spoke" one of eleven phrases at random when the "chatty ring" protruding from its upper back was pulled. The ring was attached to a string connected to a simple phonograph record inside the cavity behind the doll's abdomen. The record was driven by a metal coil wound by pulling the toy's string. The voice unit was designed by Jack Ryan, Mattel's head of research and development.

When it arrived on the market in 1960, the doll played eleven phrases, including "I love you", "I hurt myself!" and "Please take me with you". In 1963, seven more were added to the doll's repertoire, including "Let's play school" and "May I have a cookie?", for a total of 18 phrases. Cartoon voice actress June Foray, known for the voice of Rocket "Rocky" J. Squirrel in the Rocky & Bullwinkle cartoon series and other well-known cartoon characters from the 1940s to the mid-2000s, recorded the phrases for the 1960s version of Chatty Cathy.

== Clothing ==
In 1960, two outfits were available for the Chatty Cathy doll. One was a blue dress with a white eyelet overblouse, panties, crinoline, blue shoes and white socks; the other was a red velvet headband, red sunsuit with a red pinafore with an overskirt of white voile, red shoes and white socks. Other accessories included a story and comic book, a shoehorn, and a paper wrist tag that also served as a numbered warranty card. The doll and its accompanying accessories were advertised at less than $20.

In 1961, the red Chatty Cathy dress was discontinued, replaced by a pink and white striped dress with a white pinafore called "Pink Peppermint Stick", which was available until 1964. Also in 1961, six extra outfits were made separately available, including "Party Dress", "Nursery School Dress", "Sleepytime Pajamas", "Playtime Shorts set", and "Party Coat". The outfits "Sunday Visit Dress" and "Sunny Day Capri Short set" came out in 1963.

== Production history ==
In 1962, Mattel licensed its proprietary voice mechanism and licensed the Chatty Cathy doll to the Dee & Cee Toy Company of Canada. Dee & Cee, known as Mattel Canada by 1964, produced several Canadian versions of the dolls. Though made from the original American molds, there was a notable difference in the Canadian dolls' materials: the vinyl had a slightly glossier look, the doll's eyebrows had a higher/thinner arch on the forehead, and a different type of eye was used. These differences account for the higher prices of some Canadian Chattys among collectors. Some of the doll's phrases were different, reflecting cultural differences between Canada and the United States. These differences also made the doll suitable for export to other English-speaking countries. Dee & Cee's models had the same 11-18 phrases as the American Chatty Cathys.

Dee & Cee was rumored to have sold a French-speaking Chatty Cathy, though the doll recording gives her name as "Carola". According to Chatty Cathy reseller Kathy Scott, alterations made to original Canadian Chatty Cathys make it difficult to identify which original Canadian Chatty Cathys are original French-speaking "Carola" Chatty dolls, if any.

Chatty Cathy, as well as Chatty Baby and Tiny Chatty Baby, were redesigned and reissued by Mattel in 1970. The dolls were completely different in appearance from earlier Chatty dolls. Maureen McCormick, who had appeared in Chatty Cathy television commercials with future Brady Bunch co-star Eve Plumb in the 1960s, provided the voice of the new Chatty Cathy doll, which was sold for two years. All three new dolls had painted eyes, not the go-to-sleep version.

In 1984, Mattel introduced Chatty Patty, which also had a different look from the other Chatty dolls; it too had painted eyes. Mattel Classics released special reproduction editions of Chatty Cathy from 1998 to 2001. These special reproductions were made to resemble the 1960 version of Chatty Cathy with go-to-sleep "lifelike decal eyes", along with the most memorable outfits, a cartoon box with a Chatty Cathy story book, a wrist tag, and a shoehorn. The 1998 models spoke the original eleven 1960s phrases in the original June Foray voice; the special package included a numbered certificate of authenticity, a wrist tag with a picture of Chatty Cathy creators Ruth and Elliot Handler, and a special letter from Ruth Handler.

The special reproduction editions were sold exclusively in JCPenney stores (later in specialty doll and toy stores) and priced starting at $98.99. The models came in three well-known outfits. One of the three models had brown eyes. All the original 1998 models had blonde bob hairstyles.

Mattel also sold a "Holiday" Chatty Cathy in a holiday-themed cartoon box with a tree ornament on the wrist and a newly designed holiday dress. The holiday model, the only one from 1998/99 with long curled brown hair and brown "pinwheel" type eyes, plays some original phrases as well as holiday-themed ones. All 1998/99 Chatty Cathys sold out immediately, most purchased by avid collectors, resellers, and fans of the original dolls.

In 1965, Mattel licensed its proprietary voice box/mechanism to the Rosebud Doll Company in England, which produced a British "Chatty Cathy" that spoke different phrases in a British accent (the doll does not say its name is Cathy). Sold until about 1970, the dolls were made from different molds and do not resemble any of the North American Mattel Chatty Cathys. According to Kathy Scott, the British dolls came in three models: sandy blonde with tight short curls, platinum blonde with long straight hair, or long straight brown hair on a stubbier 18-inch model.

== In popular culture ==
The popularity of Chatty Cathy led to many pull-string talking dolls flooding the toy industry. The same basic pull-string talking mechanisms were used in all other Mattel talking dolls and toys of the 1960s and 1970s. These included favorites like talking Bugs Bunny, Porky Pig, Mrs. Beasley, Drowsy, Herman Munster, Dr. Seuss characters, Woody Woodpecker, Mister Ed, and all the See 'n Say toys. When Mattel's Baby First Step ("the world's first walking doll") sold well upon its introduction in 1965, a talking version was released the following year.

Other Mattel dolls that "learned to talk" were the Baby Tender Love line (1970), which eventually included Talking Baby Tender Love, and the Baby Beans line (1971), which spawned a Talking Baby Beans. Many dolls from the Barbie line were sold in pull-string talking versions in the late 1960s and early 1970s.

"Living Doll", a 1963 episode of The Twilight Zone, features a murderous talking doll named "Talky Tina" modeled after Chatty Cathy and voiced by June Foray, the original voice of Chatty Cathy. The doll used to portray Talky Tina was produced by the Vogue Doll Company between 1959 and 1961 and marketed under the name "Brikette".

The term "Chatty Cathy" can be used to refer to a particularly talkative person. In the 1987 movie Planes, Trains and Automobiles, Steve Martin scolds John Candy, saying, "It's like going on a date with a Chatty Cathy doll. I expect you have a little string on your chest, you know, that I pull out and have to snap back." In the Arrow episode "Lost Souls", Felicity Smoak refers to Green Arrow as a "Chatty Cathy" for talking to her mother too often. The How I Met Your Mother episode titled "Spoiler Alert" shows Ted dating a very talkative woman named Cathy.

The "Corey's Remix" episode of That '80s Show features a scene in which Katie Howard demands that her brother Corey apologize for cutting the string from her Chatty Cathy doll when they were kids, thus making it just plain "Cathy".

The character Gabby Gabby in the 2019 film Toy Story 4 was inspired by Chatty Cathy and "Talky Tina", according to director Josh Cooley.

The 2007 Robot Chicken episode "Moesha Poppins" depicts a fictional Michael Moore listing the fates of several "girl toys" that faded into obscurity, ending with Chatty Cathy, whose tongue is cut out by the mafia after she witnesses a mob crime.

A GEICO commercial from 2007 parodied the Chatty Cathy commercial with the dolls saying phrases about their car insurance rates. In 2007 and 2010, Hallmark released the Chatty Cathy keepsake ornament.

== Other media ==
=== Film ===
A live-action film adaptation produced by Mattel Films and Aggregate Films was announced in January 2022.

== See also ==
- Cindy Smart
- Edison's Phonograph Doll
- Musio
- Tekno the Robotic Puppy
