= Mattel163 =

Chinese-American video game developer

Mattel Game Studios
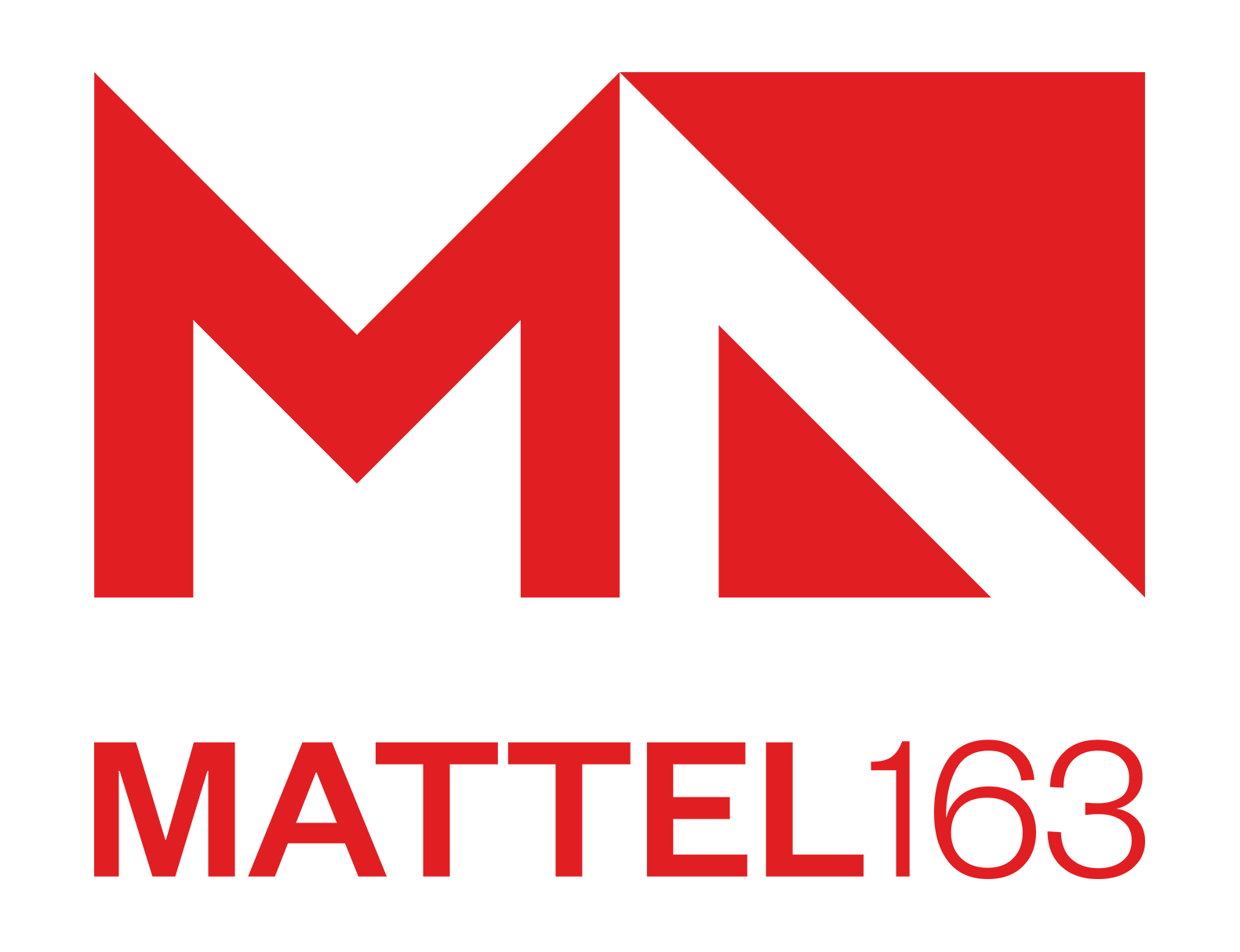
- Formerly: Mattel163 Limited (2017-2026)
- Type: Subsidiary
- Founded: 2017; 9 years ago
- Founder: Amy Huang
- Services: Video game development
- Owner: Mattel (2026–present)
- Website: https://mattel163.com

Mattel163 Limited is a Chinese-American video game developer. It was a joint venture between American toy manufacturing and entertainment company Mattel and Chinese company NetEase, aimed for developing and publishing online video games based on the former's intellectual properties. In 2026, Mattel acquired full ownership of Mattel163. Its headquarters are located in both Hong Kong, China and El Segundo, California, with development studios in Shanghai, Hangzhou and Los Angeles. The "163" in the name refers to the NetEase's domain, 163.com.

The company's first published product was UNO!, originally launched for Facebook Instant Games in 2017; it later released on iOS and Android.

== History ==
At near end of 2017, Mattel and NetEase partnered to create a new development studio. Mattel163 CEO Amy Huang-Lee says:

It was a very good match for both companies. One wanted to get into digital entertainment, while the other wanted to get into markets outside of China. It took about a year. We started discussing everything in late 2016 and we spent most of 2017 working out the details. We started then working on Uno, which was our first game.

On October 12, 2019, Mattel163 released Phase 10: World Tour, a mobile card game in the likeness of UNO!.

In 2021, Mattel163 released the mobile version of Skip-Bo.

In 2025, Mattel163 released UNO Wonder on the App Store and Google Play.

In 2026, Mattel acquired full ownership of Mattel163 from NetEase for $159 million.

That same year, Mattel163 was folded into Mattel Game Studios, a division of Mattel Digital Studios.

== Video games published ==
- UNO!, based on the Uno card game
- Phase 10, based on the Rummy card game
- Skip-Bo, based on the Spite and Malice card game
- UNO Wonder, based on the Uno card game, with new and unique rules.
