= Let's Enhance =

Ukrainian AI start-up

Let's Enhance is a Ukrainian start-up which develops an online service driven by artificial intelligence which allows improving images and zooming them without losing quality.

According to the developers, they used the super-resolution technology of machine learning. The neural network, trained on a large base of real photographs, learns to restore details and keep clear lines and contours, relying on its knowledge of typical objects and textures that exist in the real world.

In October 2021, Let's Enhance got $3 mln of investments. In addition to Chamaeleon investment company, the startup was invested by Margo Georgiadis, Hype Ventures, and Acrobator.

In June 2022, Let's Enhance introduced the second generation of its product called Claid, which improves images for marketplaces and increases conversions. It allows to automate the editing of any number of user-generated photos, control enhancement settings by changing multiple variables, and achieve a consistent and beautiful look that increases conversions.
