= Rabouge =

German card game

- Origin: Germany
- Alternative names: Rappuse, Rapuse, Grabuge, Grabouge, Rapouse, Rabuse
- Players: 2+
- Cards: 1 or more packs each
- Deck: French-suited cards
- Rank (high→low): A K Q J 10 9 8 7 6 5 4 3 2
- Play: Anticlockwise

Rabouge is a German card game for any number of players and played with French-suited cards. The aim is to discard one's cards as quickly as possible to a central pile. The game resembles Russian Bank patience for two, but is easier to play.

== Name ==
Rabouge goes under various other names including Rappuse, Rapuse, Grabuge, Grabouge, Rapouse and Rabuse. Despite its French-sounding names, it appears to be of Dutch or north German origin.

== History ==
It appears highly likely that Rabouge emerged in the second half of the 18th century. Its first rules were published in 1808 in Das neue Königliche l'Hombre. By around 1830, it had fallen out of fashion, but then experienced a revival, becoming "very popular" in late 19th century Germany and surviving into the early 20th. Bespoke Spades-only packs were made for it during this second wave of popularity.

== Players ==
The game may be played by any number of players from three (some rules: two) upwards.

== Cards ==
At least one standard 52-card French-suited pack is required for each player in the game, although "the more, the merrier". Cards rank in their natural order, Aces high, except in determining the lead when Aces are low. Suits are irrelevant in this game.

== Play ==
The following rules are based on Grimm (1840) supplemented by Endebrock (2007) and Thalberg.

Each player shuffles a pack and has it cut by the player to the left before removing the top 7 cards and placing them, unseen and face down, as a personal reserve, confusingly called the stock (German: Stock). The rest of the pack, which would normally be called the stock, forms the player's supply of 'riddance cards'. Everyone turns the top card of their stock. (Note: If there are more packs than players, each one's stock is correspondingly larger e.g. if 6 players have 12 packs between them, the stock doubles to 14; or if they have 9 packs, the stock is 10 cards.)

The player with the highest top card plays first, taking five cards unseen from the supply and laying the first one face up in the middle of the table as the 'starter' (Ausleger). Whatever its rank, whenever an equal-ranking card appears it is also laid on the table straight away. The remaining four are placed to form four discard piles in front of the player. If any card is next in sequence to the starter, it is placed on it as are any others in sequence. The next player to the right takes four cards (the starter already being out) and does the same and so on. The top card of the stock may also be played to a starter pile if it is next in sequence and must be played in preference to one from a discard pile because it counts double. If a stock card is used, the next is turned over.

In later rounds, cards that cannot be played to the starter pile may be placed on any discard pile. A top card on a discard pile may be played to the starter pile if it is next in sequence. When the last of 13 cards is played to the starter pile, that constitutes a rabouge.

Each player tries to place his cards with those of the others in sequence of 13 cards (Ace, Deuce, Trey, Four...). Any card may be used to start and suits are irrelevant.

A full sequence as well as the 13th and final card are known as a rabouge.

== Scoring ==
A player who exhausts the stock is paid 2 Marks from each opponent for every card still that opponent's stock.

A player who places the last card of a sequence, claims that as a rabouge.

== Variations ==
The game exists in several variations, but the winner is always the first player to play all his cards or, in the event that an impasse is reached, the one with the most Rabouges.

== Bibliography ==
- Endebrock, Peter (2007). "Rabouge" in The Playing-Card, Vol. 35, No. 4. April–June 2007. pp. 248 ff. ISSN 0305-2133.
