= Russian bank =

Russian bank can refer to:

- Category:Banks of Russia
- List of banks in Russia
- Central Bank of Russia
- Russian bank (card game), a game for two players
