= Jack Ryan (designer) =

American toy designer

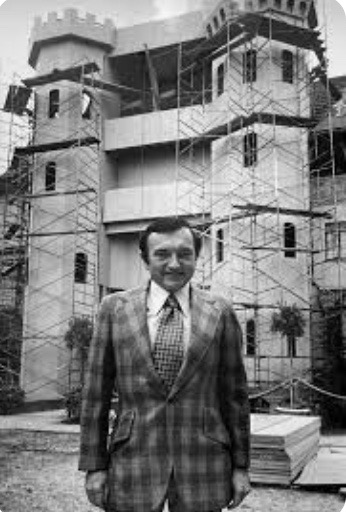
Jack Ryan and his Bel Air Castle

John William Ryan (November 12, 1926 – August 13, 1991) was an American toy designer, inventor, and engineer, best known for creating some of the most popular toys of the 20th century, including Barbie, Chatty Cathy, and Hot Wheels. A Yale-trained engineer who began his career in the aerospace industry, Ryan brought mechanical ingenuity and a flair for fantasy to Mattel, where he helped redefine modern play. Known for holding more than 1,000 patents worldwide, Ryan lived a colorful personal life that mirrored the creativity of his work, including a brief marriage to actress Zsa Zsa Gabor and extravagant parties at his Bel Air castle.

== Early life and education ==
Ryan was born in Yonkers, New York, in 1926. Growing up in a creative but demanding household, he showed an early talent for invention. During World War II, he enrolled in Yale University through the V-12 Navy College Training Program, a highly competitive initiative to train future Navy officers and technical specialists. After completing his degree in engineering, Ryan initially pursued a career in defense technology, applying his skills to missile systems and aerospace design.

In 1950, he married Barbara "Barbie" Harris, with whom he shared a passion for adventure and innovation. Together, they had two daughters, Ann Priscilla Ryan and Diana Carol Ryan. Their early family life was marked by cross-country moves and Ryan's growing ambitions, eventually leading them to Los Angeles.

== Career ==
=== Aerospace engineering ===
Ryan worked for Raytheon in the postwar years, specializing in missile systems such as the Hawk and Sparrow low-altitude defense missiles. Although successful in aerospace, Ryan sought a career that would allow for more creative expression.

=== Mattel ===
In 1955, Ryan joined Mattel, then a growing toy company founded by Ruth and Elliot Handler.

Inspired by the German-designed Bild Lilli doll, Jack Ryan engineered the key features that would define Barbie — including her articulation, balance, and poseability. Although Mattel co-founder Ruth Handler promoted the idea of a teenage fashion doll, later disputes arose over who deserved primary credit for the doll’s design.

Ryan later engineered the voice mechanism for Chatty Cathy, the first mass-produced talking doll, revolutionizing interactive play for children. He also helped create Hot Wheels, applying automotive and aerospace engineering to design miniature cars with unprecedented speed, style, and performance. Inspired by California hot rod culture, Hot Wheels redefined the toy car industry, surpassing older brands like Matchbox.

During his tenure at Mattel, Ryan secured over 1,000 patents worldwide, fueling the company's explosive growth during the 1950s and 1960s. His ideas on blending technical precision with imaginative play were later preserved by Stanford University, where his "Design Philosophy" is archived.

In 1970, Ryan left Mattel amid disputes over royalties for his designs and later filed a lawsuit against the company.

In later years, disputes over Barbie’s origins resurfaced. In 2023, a Fox News report quoted his daughter, Ann Ryan, discussing his major contributions and the ongoing controversy.

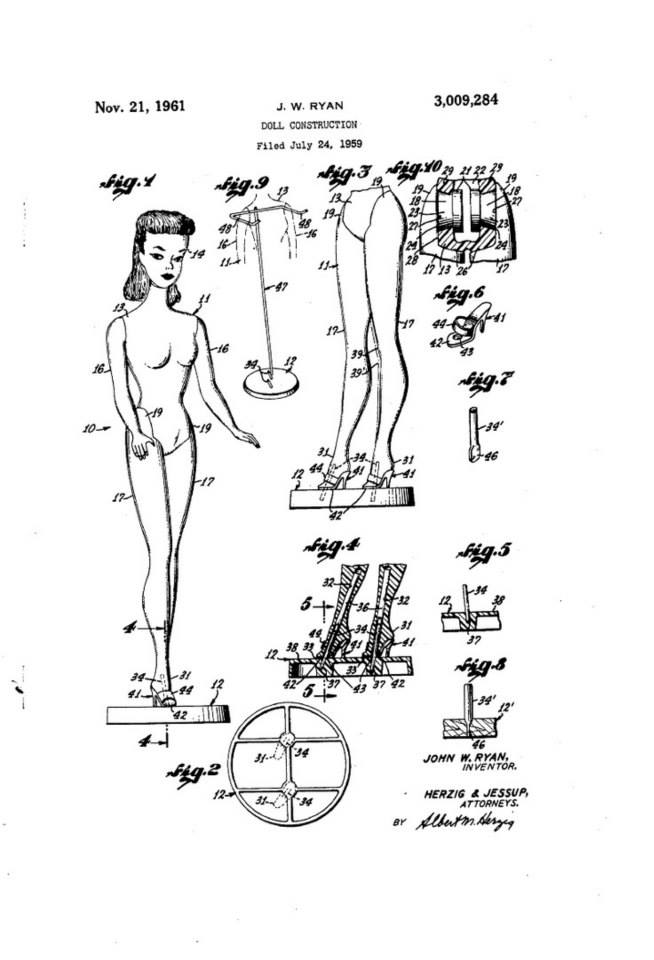
Patent drawing for Barbie doll (US Patent 3,009,284), 1961

== Personal life ==
Ryan’s personal life mirrored the fantastical worlds he created for children. He lived in a sprawling, castle-like mansion at 688 Nimes Road in Bel Air, Los Angeles (the second-oldest house in the neighborhood) originally built by Academy Award-winning actor Warner Baxter. The estate featured turreted architecture, secret passageways, and a luxury treehouse with a chandelier where he gave intimate dinner parties for Los Angeles' A-list.

Inside the mansion, Ryan created the "Tom Jones Room", a grand medieval dining hall decorated with throne chairs, banners, and minstrel performances during elaborate Renaissance-themed feasts. Guests often arrived in costume, feasted under candlelight, and, on occasion, witnessed horses ridden into the hall during celebrations.

Ryan was married five times:

- Barbara "Barbie" Harris (married 1950, divorced 1971)
- Zsa Zsa Gabor (married 1975, divorced 1976)
- Linda Henson (married 1979, until her death in 1981)
- Gari Hardy Lansing (married 1981, divorced 1985)
- Magda Orzechowski (married 1985)

His brief and glamorous marriage to Zsa Zsa Gabor attracted widespread media attention.

== Legacy ==
Ryan’s contributions to the toy industry left a lasting mark on American culture. Often referred to as the "father of Barbie" for his engineering and creative work, he developed the internal mechanisms that allowed the doll to pose, balance, and endure children’s play. Barbie became one of the most iconic and best-selling toys in history, influencing generations of children and redefining the global doll market. Hot Wheels, another of Ryan’s signature creations, grew into one of the best-selling toy brands of all time, with over six billion cars sold worldwide by the 21st century.

Ryan died in Los Angeles in 1991 at the age of 64. His achievements were recognized in obituaries published by the Los Angeles Times and the New York Times, which credited him with shaping some of the most iconic toys of the 20th century.

In 2024, the documentary Barbie Uncovered, produced by Two Rivers Media, revisited the history of Barbie’s invention and highlighted Jack Ryan’s contributions, featuring interviews with his daughter, Ann Ryan.

In 2026, Ryan's daughter Ann Ryan published Dad, Barbie & Me: An Insider Biography (KDP, 2026), a memoir drawing on family archives and interviews that documents Ryan's inventions, his personal life, and the disputes over credit for Barbie's creation.
