= Charmin' Chatty =

Talking toy doll

Charmin' Chatty was a doll produced by the toy company Mattel in 1963 and 1964. The doll, introduced at the American Toy Fair in New York City in March 1963, belonged to a line of highly successful talking dolls introduced in 1960 (Chatty Cathy was the first of these dolls). Other chatty dolls in the line (and the year they were introduced) were Chatty Baby (1962), Tiny Chatty Baby (1963), Tiny Chatty Brother (1963) and Singin' Chatty (1965). Mattel trademarked the word chatty in the 1960s, and some of the packaging for its talking toys carried the tag line, "A Chatty doll by Mattel" or "A Chatty toy by Mattel". Mattel dolls such as Drowsy, Baby Cheryl, and Tatters had the tag line on their boxes that said, "A Chatty Doll by Mattel."

Charmin' Chatty was distinguished from Mattel's other talking dolls by having changeable records; packaging for the doll, as well as packaging for the clothing and games sold separately, featured a symbol reading: "Changeable Record Doll." Charmin' Chatty spoke different phrases when a pullstring attached to a "chatty ring" protruding from its upper back was pulled. The ring was connected to a simple low-fidelity phonograph record in the doll's abdomen. The record was driven by a metal coil wound by pulling the toy's string.

Three-inch records were inserted and removed from a slot in the left side of the doll. The basic doll came with 5 double-sided "chatty records" with 12 phrases on each side of the record. Thus, with 10 sides total, the doll was able to speak 120 different phrases. By comparison, the original version of Chatty Cathy, introduced in 1960, spoke only 11 phrases (a repertoire which was later expanded to 18 phrases in 1963). Initially, the records were made of black vinyl, which was vulnerable to warping and blistering, so they were quickly replaced by white nylon records.The titles of the records that came with the doll were: Get Acquainted Side 1 and Side 2, Poems/Proverbs, Scary/Animal Noises, Mother/Ridiculous, & Good/Famous.

Charmin' Chatty's shoulder-length hair was available in blonde and auburn, and she had blue side glancing "life-like decal eyes." Standing 24 inches tall, the doll came with a sailor outfit (a white jacket with a red sailor collar, jumper dress with a navy blue skirt, red knee socks, and blue-and-white saddle shoes). The doll, which wore eyeglass frames, was called "the educated doll". Eight different outfits were available separately for the doll; each came with a record with phrases related to that particular outfit.

Among the different costume sets and themes for Charmin' Chatty were "Let's Play Together", "Let's Go Shopping", "Let's Play Nurse", "Let's Play Cinderella", "Let's Play Birthday Party", "Let's Play Pajama Party", and "Let's Play Tea Party". One outfit called "Let's Talk 'n Travel in Foreign Lands" came with 4 double-sided records and allowed the doll to speak in English and 6 other languages. Sometimes referred to as Charmin' Chatty's travel set, this is the most sought-after outfit by collectors. It included a navy blue coat, red straw hat, and blue shoes for the doll, plus a flight bag and stewardess hat for the child to wear (the idea being Charmin' Chatty was going on an around-the-world airplane trip and the child was the stewardess). Phrases included on the travel set records were, "The Queen lives in Buckingham Palace", "Garçon means boy in French", and "In German, Schule means school". Included in each set were props for the child to wear or use. One of the phrases on the record accompanying Charmin' Chatty's shopping outfit was, "Shall we buy a Barbie doll?"

There were four "Chatty Games" available, packaged in sets of two games each: "Chatty at the Fair/Chatty Skate 'N Slide" and "Chatty Animal Round-up/Chatty Animal Friends". The games came with a record that allowed the doll to call out game moves when its string was pulled. Due to the unpredictability of which phrase the Charmin' Chatty would say when activated, it was possible for the doll to win the game.

Charmin' Chatty was included in World Book Encyclopedia's doll section, representing the quintessential modern doll of the era. The doll was also featured on the cover of the December 7, 1963 Saturday Evening Post and a Little Golden Book was written about the doll.
