= Spite and malice =

Two-player card game

- Origin: United States
- Alternative names: Cat and Mouse
- Players: 2 or more (originally 2)
- Deck: Two 52-card
- Rank (high→low): K Q J 10 9 8 7 6 5 4 3 2 A

Spite and malice, also known as cat and mouse, is a relatively modern American card game for two or more players. It is a reworking of the late 19th-century Continental game crapette, also known as Russian bank, and is a form of competitive solitaire, with a number of variations that can be played with two or three regular decks of cards.

It had a "well-deserved following" during the 1970s when bridge expert Easley Blackwood saw it being played on a cruise ship and subsequently published its rules. According to David Parlett, the game is a reworking of an old 19th-century patience called crapette or Russian bank, but he also identifies three early English patiences by Mary Whitmore Jones – carbouche, obstruction, and dowager's patience – which bear a "remarkable similarity" to spite and malice.

A commercial variation sold by Hasbro is called Spite and Malice; a variation sold by Mattel is called Skip-Bo.

== History ==
This modern American card game is not recorded until the 1960s, an early reference being seen as a trend-setting game by The Santa Fe Magazine in 1963. The first rules are recorded by Richard L. Frey in 1965, who calls it "a recent husband-and-wife game that in some places rivals Russian Bank in popularity". However, John McLeod points out that the version that appears in card books is "rather different" from those usually played.

== Rules ==
The deck consists of three regular playing card decks with the jokers removed (or jokers may be retained and used as wild), although the United States Playing Card Company's version of the game uses two 52-card decks. The rank of the cards is ace low and proceeding normally up to queen, which is the highest card in the deck. Kings are wild and may substitute for any other card rank except ace. Suits have no bearing on the game.

The game is usually played with 2 to 4 players. The object is to be the first person to move all the cards in your goal pile into the playing piles. Players cut for the deal, with the highest card winning. Dealer deals 26 cards to each player (or 13 cards if a shorter game is desired). The players do not look at these cards but simply collect them into a pile called the goal pile. Once each goal pile is dealt, the top card is turned over by each player and placed face up on the pile. All undealt cards are left face down in a stack placed central to all players called the draw pile.

There are three kinds of piles in Spite and Malice:

- Goal piles
  - Each player tries to play through his goal pile. The one doing so first wins.
  - If a player cannot play the card in his goal pile, he may attempt to block someone else from playing.
- Playing piles
  - Play piles are community piles used by all players.
  - There are a maximum of four playing piles open at any one time.
  - Each playing pile is opened with an ace.
  - Playing proceeds upward in normal rank all the way to the Queen.
  - Once a queen is played on a playing pile, that pile is dead and it is removed from the immediate playing area until enough cards are collected to shuffle them and return them to the draw pile.
- Discard piles
  - Discard piles belong only to the player who made them; players may not interfere with or play from one another's discard piles.
  - Each player has a maximum of four discard piles.
  - Playing a card into a discard pile ends the player's turn and passes it on to the next player.
  - The cards played into the discard piles must be played out in reverse order of their being laid down; one must remove cards from the top of discard piles when putting them into the playing piles.
  - Players often organize their discard piles by being all of the same number or by descending card ranks so that they may be played sequentially.
  - Players cannot discard an ace.

== Play ==
Play starts with the dealer and goes around the table in a clockwise fashion. Each turn starts with a player drawing from the common draw pile to give themselves a five-card hand. They then make whatever plays they can until they have no more plays that they want to do, and then they discard a card from their hand into their personal discard area. If they put all 5 cards out before making a discard they pick up 5 more cards and continue. They may ONLY put one card out on their personal discard area and may NOT play a buried card in their personal discard area when they are playing. When they put a card out on their personal discard area, their turn is over

The best move would be to play the goal card directly on a playing pile (it would have to be an ace at this point, since all four playing piles are empty at this point). If this is not possible, the player may use the cards in their hand to put cards into the playing piles and "play up" to the value of the goal card. If the player cannot do either of these things, the turn might simply consist of making a discard to one of their four discard piles.

However, if all five cards in the hand can be played in the playing piles (for example, if a player drew A, 2, 3, A, 2, they could play ace, two, three on one playing pile and ace and then 2 on a second pile), resulting in running out of cards before making a discard, that player may draw five more playing cards to replenish their hand. It is possible, if not probable, for this to happen more than once, or even a few times in a row, before someone is forced to make a discard because they cannot make any further plays.

Once a discard is made, the turn moves to the next player. That person starts their turn by drawing cards from the draw pile to make their five-card hand. On someone's first turn they will always draw five cards, but on subsequent turns they will draw however many cards are required. For example, suppose they are able to play three cards and then ends their first turn with their discard. On the next turn, they would have one card left in their hand and would then draw four more to reconstitute a five-card hand. If a player's only possible move on their first play is to discard because they have no playable card on the playing piles, they would discard one card, leaving them with four, in which case on their next turn they would simply draw one card to end up with the standard five-card hand. No matter how many cards are able to be played, a turn ends with a player placing a card from their hand into one of their discard piles (unless they play the winning move of putting their last goal card into play, in which case they win and no discard is required).

If everyone has a high goal card at the start of play, there may be many turns where the players draw just one card and then decide which card to add to the discard piles until someone gets a sufficient number of cards saved up in the discard piles of cards to reach their high number. Or one person may end up with a low goal card and, in reaching that one and then ending their turn, they will have unavoidably helped someone else to reach their higher number goal card.

As play continues, many cards can accumulate in the discard piles. In order to make your goal card or prevent your opponent from reaching theirs, you can use cards from both your hand and your discard piles during your turn.

== Scoring ==
After each hand has ended, scoring takes place. Only the player who cleared their goal pile can score: They score five points for clearing the goal pile and one point per card left in their opponents' goal piles. If, in the rare instance that the draw pile is exhausted and there is no possible way to furnish a new one, a drawn hand is declared, and the person closest to a cleared goal pile scores the difference between their opponents' leftover cards and their own. Games are usually played to 25, 50, or 100 points.

== Variants ==
Some rules use unlimited center stacks; they are only removed when the draw stack is depleted. Also, sometimes a rule is employed requiring aces and deuces to be played any time a player is able to do so.

Spite and Malice is similar to a game called Misery. It is played with 2 players. Two decks are used instead of three (unless three people play—then three decks are used) and two (goal) piles of 12 per player and a hand of 6.

Another variation calls for all piles to be built up to the king, with jokers used as wild cards. (Wild represents all cards besides A, 2, 7, and J.)

Yet another variant requires a wild card to be immediately covered by the next card, but also does not allow wild cards to be used in place of 7's (or Queens, because a Queen ends the stack and cannot be covered).

One variation calls for one deck for every player (e.g., 3 players play with 3 decks) with a maximum of four center stacks to be built from ace to queen, with kings as wilds. (Jokers are not used here.)

Another variation requires a natural A and 2 (no wild cards for A or 2) but does permit discarding of pairs of cards (e.g., two queens, two 7's, etc.), but no more than two cards at a time.

== Commercial versions ==
A commercial variation sold by Hasbro is called Spite and Malice; Mattel's version is called Skip-Bo.

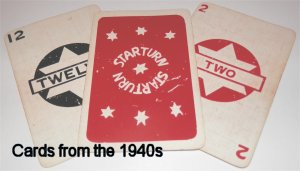
Original cards for Starturn, from the 1940s

William Henry Storey designed a card game Starturn which was published by Chad Valley in 1935, and which had almost the same rules as Spite and Malice.

Two packs, 44 very dark gray and 52 stop sign red, are used in a game primarily for two players although there were versions for three or four players. Black cards are divided equally between the players, placed face down with only the top card visible, as the Stack. Five red cards are dealt to each player, made up to five on each pass, and the rest placed as the draw Pack. The aim is to make up to four Build piles starting at 1 through to 15, using cards from the player's Stack where possible. Each player must discard one card at the end of each pass (except when all cards in the hand have been used on Build piles) on to one of four discard piles in front of each player, from which cards may be used (strictly, top card first) in forming Build piles. Completed Build piles are shuffled into the Pack as soon as completed. The first player to use up all of their Stack cards is the winner.

== Literature ==
- _ (1963). The Santa Fe Magazine, Vol. 53.
- Frey, Richard L. (1965). According to Hoyle. Hawthorn Books. 320 pp.
