= Kenneth Handler =

American filmmaker and namesake of Mattel's Ken doll (1944–1994)

- Born: Kenneth Robert Handler; March 22, 1944; Los Angeles, California, U.S.
- Died: June 11, 1994 (aged 50); New York City, New York, U.S.
- Occupations: Screenwriter, director, composer
- Known for: Namesake of the Ken doll
- Spouse: Suzie Handler (m. 1963)
- Children: 3
- Parents: Elliot Handler (father); Ruth Handler (mother)

Kenneth Robert Handler (March 22, 1944 – June 11, 1994) was an American screenwriter, director, and film composer.

He was the son of Mattel founders Elliot Handler and Ruth Handler, creators of the Barbie and Ken doll, the latter of which is named after him. He directed Delivery Boys and A Place Without Parents.

== Early life ==
Kenneth Handler was born on March 22, 1944, in southern California. He showed an early love and talent for both movies and music; he played piano, listened to opera, and watched foreign movies with subtitles. He was something of a non-conformist to the world and shared his father's creative talents, and got along reasonably well with his mother Ruth. This was in contrast to his sister Barbara, who had more fraught relations with her mother while growing up; the two siblings did not particularly get along. In later interviews, Kenneth said his sister was "a conform freak" in contrast to his self-designation as a "nerd", while Barbara called Kenneth an "eccentric." Handler attended Hamilton High School.

== Education and career ==
Handler received a bachelor's degree in music from UCLA. In 1965, he worked in the mailroom at Universal Studios with Mike Medavoy.

In 1966, Handler and Norm Ratner founded Penthouse, a music label distributed by Mira. Handler subsequently formed Canterbury Records, a Penthouse subsidiary, with Pat Boone. In 1968, Mattel backed a music group of teens, the Bath-House Brass, and produced an EP featuring two songs, "It's a Gas" and "Davy," with Capitol Records as distributor; Handler wrote and produced "It's a Gas." The release of the EP was tied to a line of musical instrument toys. The record was promoted to Top 40 stations, featured in a "promotional film," and the music was used in Mattel commercials. The promotional budget for the two-month campaign was $300,000 ($2.6 million in 2022).

During the 1970s, Handler also owned a photography gallery in Los Angeles, Chiaroscuro Galleries, where, according to After Dark, a culture magazine with a heavily LGBTQ+ influence, he showed his own work in a show called All-American Boys, which featured two portfolios, "Children of the Streets (read Selma Avenue) and Children of Affluence." Selma Avenue is probably a reference to the Los Angeles street that runs parallel to Hollywood Boulevard, where gay hustlers worked in those years. (Anthony Friedkin famously photographed hustlers on Selma Avenue.)

Handler may have run a casting couch throughout his years in entertainment. Bobby Jameson, signed briefly to Penthouse, alleged that Handler dropped him in 1966 after Jameson refused a sexual advance. In 2016, Taimak wrote in his memoir that Handler offered him a role in Delivery Boys contingent on sexual favors. Taimak declined the role.

== Music industry involvement ==
It was reported in the 21 January 1967 issue of Record World that Handler and his Canterbury record label had moved into the r&b field. Veteran A&R man Bobby Sanders was to head the r&b division of Canterbury. With Sanders, came Soultown Productions which was to operate under the Canterbury brand. The first release for the label was "Countdown" by The Tempos which had been cut the previous week. The single had been a Four-Star Pick in the 7 January issue of Record World and according to the reviewer, it was chart bound. The song would later find popularity on the Northern soul scene. Another artist that was signed to Canterbury was folk singer Lenny Roybal.

== Relation with Ken dolls ==
Despite being named after him, Kenneth was not involved in the Ken dolls design, and felt ambivalent at best and resentful at worst toward them. He seems to have disliked the materialism promoted by the dolls (compared to more traditional play activities) and worried about negative impacts toward children's self-image. He wrote a letter to his parents in 1970 complaining that the dolls were "[kow]towing to those who can't accept the issue of their own sexuality."

== Personal life ==
Handler married Suzie Handler in 1963. They had three children. Handler died on June 11, 1994. His mother publicly stated that his cause of death was a brain tumor, but multiple writers, including Jerry Oppenheimer and Robin Gerber, attribute his death to AIDS-related complications. Handler had come out as gay to his parents and acknowledged his AIDS diagnosis in 1990. His parents and wife were all supportive of him and helped however they could. In 2019, Gerber told journalist Rich Juzwiak that she confirmed Ken Handler's cause of death by consulting correspondence between Ruth Handler and Ken's physician, and by interviewing the physician herself, as well as a box of restricted materials in the Mattel archive.
