= Delivery Boys =

- Delivery Boys promotional poster
- Directed by: Ken Handler
- Written by: Ken Handler
- Produced by: Craig Horrall; Per Sjostedt
- Cinematography: Larry Revene
- Music by: Ken Handler
- Production companies: Platinum Pictures; Pegasus Productions
- Distributed by: New World Pictures
- Release date: 1985
- Country: United States
- Language: English

Delivery Boys is a 1985 film directed by Ken Handler about a multiethnic group of pizza delivery boys who start a breakdancing team.

Delivery Boys was a self-funded vanity project in which Handler paid Chuck Vincent's Platinum Pictures to produce the film.

Mario Van Peebles, Scott Thompson Baker, Kelly Nichols, Samantha Fox, Veronica Hart and Annabelle Gurwitch have cameo roles. Naima Kradjian, a former Republican candidate for mayor of Binghamton, New York, also appears in the film.

== Cast ==
- Josh Marcano as Max
- Tom Sierchio as Joey
- Jim Soriero as Conrad
- Nelson Vasquez as Izzie
- Yayo González as Scandal (as Yayo Gonzalez)
- Sammy Luquis as Sike
- Richie Pineiro as Sir Fresh
- George Ovalle as Sailor
- Rodney Harvey as Fast Action
- Deckard Fontanes as Paulie
- Jody Oliver as Angelina
- Mario Van Peebles as Spider (as Mario Van Peebles)
- Naylon Mitchell as Jazz Mace
- Ralph Cole Jr. as Wild Man
- Frank Lynn as Funkie Frankie
- Alex Wood as Mighty Whitey
- Jose Roman as Thunder
- Eddie Roman as Fast Frost
