= A Place Without Parents =

- Directed by: Kenneth Handler
- Starring: Nicholas Wahler, Craig Horrall
- Production company: Runnymede
- Distributed by: Dimension Pictures
- Release date: 1974
- Country: United States
- Language: English

A Place without Parents is a 1974 American film. Originally known as Pigeon, it was also released as Truckin’.

== See also ==
- List of American films of 1974
