= See 'n Say =

Educational toy

See 'n Say is an educational toy created by Mattel in 1964 after the success of Chatty Cathy. It was the first Mattel talking toy allowing children to choose the exact phrase as heard. Although the first release focuses on farm animal sounds, it had spawned through many themes from the alphabet, counting, nursery rhymes, to licensed products.

As of October 2023, a version of the product was still available from Mattel.

== History ==
In the 1960s, after introducing a line of talking dolls that said different phrases when a string protruding from their upper back was pulled, Mattel trademarked the word chatty. Several Mattel pull-string talking dolls and toys were packaged in boxes that read "A Chatty Toy" or "A Chatty Doll by Mattel". However, these dolls and toys spoke phrases at random when their "chatty ring" was pulled. See 'N Say, introduced in 1964, was the first Mattel talking toy that allowed children to choose the exact phrase they wanted to hear by adjusting a pointer on the toy's face to a particular item and pulling the "chatty ring".

The Farmer Says See 'N Say made animal sounds when a pointer shaped like a miniature farmer was aimed at pictures of animals on its dial. For example, when pointed at an image of a sheep, the phrase "The sheep goes...baa, baa" was heard. Likewise, the Bee Says See 'N Say recited different letters of the alphabet ("G...Girl") when its bee-shaped pointer was aimed at them. Unlike other toys, the original See 'n Says required no batteries. Instead, sound was produced by a simple low-fidelity phonograph record driven by a metal coil wound by pulling the toy's string. This was the same mechanism used in Chatty Cathy dolls.

After the success of the Bee Says, the Farmer Says, Mattel introduced several other toys in the line. The Mister Sound Says made city sounds, the Mister Music Says reproduced sounds of musical instruments, the Zookeeper says which made Zoo Animal sounds, Mister Circus says which made Circus sounds and the Clock Says gave the time indicated by the position of the pointer on its face. A Doctor Dolittle Says edition was released after the 1967 film Doctor Dolittle, and See 'N Says featuring Disney characters were introduced in 1968. In 1968 Mattel created a Winnie the Pooh See 'N Say exclusively for Sears and Roebuck department stores. Also introduced in 1968 were See 'N Say Talking Storybooks. Children would open the book to a page, aim the pointer at the arrow printed on the page, and pull the chatty ring. A pull-lever version of See 'N Say Talking Storybooks was released in the 1990s with different titles.

A Mother Goose and a "Snoopy Says" See 'N Say were unveiled in 1969. One recited nursery rhymes the other featured Peanuts comic strip characters. Also that year, Mattel introduced Mister Circus Says and Sing-A-Song, both part of its Super See 'N Say line. These two, which were battery-operated, worked slightly differently from earlier See 'N Says. Instead of pulling a string, the pointer was pushed and released to make the toy talk. The battery-operated toys were able to recite longer phrases than earlier pull-string versions. The remaining titles for the Super See 'N Say line were, "I Wish I Were" and the "Dr. Seuss Zoo", both released in 1970.

In the 1970s, See 'N Say pointers were streamlined into a uniform design, a large arrow with a sticker affixed to it depicting a bee, farmer, and so forth. In the early 1980s The Zoo Keeper Says was added to the rapidly expanding See 'N Say line. By 1989, the chatty ring was replaced by a lever that could be pulled to make the toy talk, after a Rhode Island girl was blinded by a snapped string.

Playskool, a division of Hasbro manufactured the "Sounds Around" rival toy.

Chatty records were replaced with computer chips in 1989. The owl shaped See 'N Say, the "Whooo Says" used a push button to activate it, and was the first model to use a flip-page format as well as computer chips. The new version of the Farmer Says toy still emits the same farm animal sounds that were used in the original 1965 See 'N Say. In 2001, the "Kids Around the World" See 'N Say was introduced that developed a different format: identifying placements on the map, had a pointer that tells which game to play, touch button countries and continents, and gameplay.

In 2015, Little People released a new version of the 2003 "Farmer Says" version called "Farmer Eddie Says" and has a new voice given to the toy itself and has a different twist to two classic nursery rhymes such as "The Farmer in the Dell" and "Old MacDonald Had a Farm".

== Pop Culture ==
A replica of the 1989 model of The Farmer Says was featured in the 1995 Disney Pixar movie Toy Story, as a resident toy living in Andy’s Room, the 1970 pull string model of The Farmer Says appeared in Toy Story 3 (2010), being used as a roulette machine by Lotso’s henchmen. In the King Of Queens season 3 episode 7 “Strike Out”, Doug Heffernan (Kevin James), Arthur Spooner (Jerry Stiller), and Deacon Palmer (Victor Williams) play with the toy, which belongs to Deacon’s son Major, to use as a gambling machine. In Mister Rogers' Neighborhood season 21 episode 1627, “Mouths and Feelings: Listening to Laughing Sound Effects”, a similar toy appears in Rogers’ closet called a Speak N Spell. Instead of having an arrow, the toy has you pull the words to hear a specific animal sound.
