= Skip-Bo =

Card game

Cards in box

Skip-Bo is a commercial version of the card game Spite and Malice, a derivative of Russian Bank (also known as Crapette or Tunj), which in turn originates from Double Klondike (also called Double Solitaire). In 1967, Minnie Hazel "Skip" Bowman (1915–2001) of Brownfield, Texas, began producing a boxed edition of the game under the name SKIP-BO. In 1980 the game was purchased by International Games, which was subsequently bought by Mattel in 1992. A mobile version of the game for iOS was released by Magmic in September, 2013. There is a new version called "SKIP-BO” that comes in a green, white and yellow case.

== Card and deck styles ==
Individual card

The deck consists of 162 cards, twelve each of the numbers 1 through 12 and eighteen "SKIP-BO" wild cards which may be played as any number. Alternatively, the 162 cards could be three regular decks of playing cards, including the jokers, with ace to queen corresponding to 1 to 12 and the kings and jokers corresponding to the SKIP-BO cards. Before 1980, the commercial game consisted of four decks of regular playing cards with eight SKIP-BO cards replacing the standard two jokers in each deck. In addition, the aces, twos and threes in the fourth deck were marked SKIP-BO. The remainder of the fourth deck was discarded. The cards come in blue, green, and red.

== Play ==
Two to four people can play at a time as individuals, or, six or more players in teams (no more than three partnerships). The object of the game is to be the first player or team to empty their entire stock pile(s). The player with the middle age goes first. Each player is dealt 30 cards (recommended 10-15 for faster play) for their pile with only the top card visible, and a hand of five cards, and the remaining cards are placed face down to create a common draw pile. The shared play area allows up to four build piles, which must be started using either a "1" card or a Skip-Bo, and each player also has up to four personal discard piles. Each turn the active player draws until they have five cards in hand, though there are cases of not drawing more cards to equal five cards, instead doing a draw of a certain number of cards. They must play either the next card in sequential order or a wild Skip-Bo card, using either cards in hand, the top card of their stock, or the top card of any of their four discard piles. If the player can play all five cards from their hand, they draw five more and continue playing. When no more plays are available, the player discards one card to either an empty discard pile or on top of an existing one and play passes to the next player. When a build pile reaches 12, it is removed from the board and that space becomes empty for another pile to be started; play continues until one player has played their final stock card.

== Scoring ==
For single rounds, whoever goes out first is the winner.

If multiple games are going to be played, either track the number of wins for each player or a point system may be used.

For the points scoring, the winning player receives 25 points for winning plus 5 points for each card in his/her opponents' stock piles. The first player to reach 500 points wins.

== Partnerships ==
Another option for game play is to pair up players as partners. Play is the same except:

- Each partnership has two stock piles and two sets of four discard piles (eight discard piles total) regardless of the number of individuals per partnership.
- The active player can use their partner's stock and discard piles in addition to their own stock and discard piles.
- The active player's partner(s) must remain silent.

== Digital versions ==
Various electronic handheld versions of Skip-Bo have been released over the years. A licensed app exists on the Apple App Store and the Google Play Store published by Mattel163.

== Reviews ==
- Jeux & Stratégie #53
