= Elliot Handler =

American inventor and business magnate (1916–2011)

- Born: Isadore Elliot Handler; April 9, 1916; Chicago, Illinois, U.S.
- Died: July 21, 2011 (aged 95); Los Angeles, California, U.S.
- Education: Art Center College of Design
- Occupation: Business magnate
- Known for: Co-founder of Mattel and inventor of the doll Ken
- Spouse: Ruth Handler (m. 1938; died 2002)
- Children: Barbara Handler and Kenneth Handler

Isadore Elliot Handler (April 9, 1916 – July 21, 2011) was an American inventor, business magnate, and the co-founder of Mattel. With his wife, Ruth Handler, he developed some of the biggest-selling toys in American history, including Barbie, Chatty Cathy, Creepy Crawlers, and Hot Wheels.

== Early life ==
Isadore "Izzy" Elliot Handler was born to a Jewish family in Chicago, Illinois, on April 9, 1916. Handler's parents were Ukrainian Jews who largely spoke Yiddish within their household. The family moved out of Chicago, and Handler grew up on the west side of Denver, Colorado. He studied industrial design at the Art Center College of Design in Pasadena, California. In 1929, he met his future wife Ruth Mosko at a B'nai B'rith dance for teenagers. They dated on and off for years, and were married in June 1938. Shortly after their marriage, his new wife Ruth requested he change his name: partially due to her preferring his middle name "Elliot" over "Izzy", and partially from her fears of American antisemitism toward a name frequently associated with being Jewish like Isadore. He complied. The couple had two children: Barbara, who was the namesake of Barbie dolls; and Kenneth, the namesake of Ken dolls. While a struggling art student and designer of light fixtures, Handler partnered with Harold Matson to design a realistic-looking miniature piano that received roughly 300,000 orders; however, they mispriced the product and lost a dime on each one produced.

== Mattel ==
Mattel received its name from business partners Harold "Matt" Matson and Elliot Handler in 1945. Elliot's wife, Ruth, took Matson's role when the Handlers bought his share in the late 1940s.

Handler holds credit for developing the first talking doll Chatty Cathy, using a pull string talking mechanism, revolutionizing the toy industry. Mattel continued to develop a number of talking toys, including Chatty Baby, Tiny Chatty Baby, and Charmin' Chatty. Toys were made for cartoon favorites such as Bugs Bunny and Porky Pig, and for television characters such as Herman Munster and Mr. Ed.

When Handler's daughter Barbara married Allan Segal, they created Allan, Ken's friend. The 1965 talking doll Baby Cheryl was named after the Handlers' first grandchild, and the Todd doll in the Barbie line was named after their grandson.

Handler was primarily responsible for two additional Mattel product lines. In 1966, Mattel introduced smaller dolls called Liddle Kiddles. Handler claimed he wanted them to resemble little children in neighborhoods across America. They were sculpted by doll artist Martha Armstrong-Hand. Kiddles were a great success and continued to be produced in different versions until the early 1970s. Another product line was Hot Wheels, introduced in 1968, which gave rise to 10,000 different models.

First called Mattel Creations, the company has become the largest toy maker in the world in terms of revenue. In April 2006, Mattel honored Handler with a 90th birthday party at its headquarters in El Segundo, California. Guests included his daughter Barbara Segal, the namesake of the Barbie doll.

== Personal life ==
Handler died of heart failure at home in Century City, a district of Los Angeles, California, at age 95 on July 21, 2011. Ruth Handler, Elliot's wife, died in 2002; their son Ken died in 1994.
