= Talma Hendler =

Israeli psychiatrist and neuroscientist (born 1955)

- תלמה הנדלר
- Born: July 9, 1955 (age 69)
- Education: Hebrew University of Jerusalem (BSc) Tel Aviv University (MD) Stony Brook University (PhD)
- Occupation(s): Psychiatrist, Neuroscientist, Professor
- Known for: Research in functional brain imaging and emotional regulation
- Spouse: Judd Ne'eman (m. 1980; died 2021)
- Children: 2

Talma Hendler (Hebrew: תלמה הנדלר; born July 9, 1955) is an Israeli psychiatrist and neuroscientist. Her work focuses on functional brain imaging to study human emotional responses, particularly in relation to stress and trauma.

Hendler is a professor at Tel Aviv University, holding appointments in the School of Psychological Science, the departments of physiology and pharmacology, the department of psychiatry within the Faculty of Medicine, and the Sagol School of Neuroscience. She is also the founding director of the Sagol Brain Institute in Tel Aviv.

== Biography ==
Hendler received a Bachelor of Science degree in biology from the Hebrew University of Jerusalem. She later earned a medical degree (MD) from Tel Aviv University and a PhD in psychobiology from Stony Brook University in New York. After returning to Israel, she completed her residency in psychiatry at Sheba Medical Center.

She subsequently joined the Tel Aviv Sourasky Medical Center, where she established the Sagol Brain Institute, which has been described as Israel's first research facility dedicated to human neuroimaging.

Hendler was married to the Israeli film director Judd Ne'eman until his death in September 2021. They had two daughters.

== Research ==
Hendler's research utilizes neuroimaging techniques, such as fMRI and EEG, to investigate the neural mechanisms underlying emotional processing and regulation. A significant area of her work is the study of factors that contribute to either vulnerability or resilience to psychiatric disorders following stressful events.

Her research group studies emotional and perceptual processing in both healthy individuals and those with brain pathologies. Her team has investigated brain responses in individuals with post-traumatic stress disorder (PTSD), examining how their brains react to emotionally charged stimuli. Peer-reviewed studies from her lab have shown that in PTSD patients, the visual cortex can exhibit strong responses to trauma-related images even when the images are presented in a way that prevents conscious recognition.
