= Richard Hendler =

American lawyer

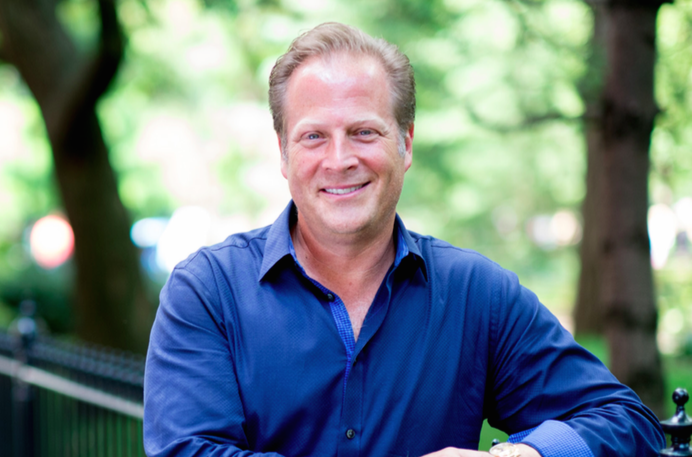
Richard Hendler

Richard Michael Hendler is an American attorney and Clinical Professor of Law in Business at New York University Stern School of Business where he teaches business law, entertainment law, and entrepreneurial law at the graduate and undergraduate levels and Law for the Management Executive for the EMBA program.

== Professional background ==
From 1988 to 1993, Hendler worked in bankruptcy and corporate restructuring at Hughes Hubbard & Reed and Kaye, Scholer, Fierman, Hays and Handler. In 1989, he joined New York University as an adjunct professor. In 1993, he became a full-time professor with the position of Clinical Associate Professor and thereafter was promoted to Clinical Full Professor of Law in Business.

In addition to his academic work, Professor Hendler maintains a private law practice in New York, handling a broad scope of business-related legal matters. At NYU School of Law, he acts as a supervising attorney for law students in the Media Law Collaborative, and he is affiliated with the Berkley Center for Entrepreneurship and Innovation as its Legal-Expert-in-Residence.

He has been a speaker at events supporting private industry trading centers. He also held speaking engagements and seminars on the standards and maintenance of truth in professional ethics for corporations such as L'Oréal, Goldman Sachs, and American Express. He was selected to speak as part of the Last Lecture series for the NYU Stern MBA class of 2017 and at NYU Stern's 2018 Graduate Convocation.

== Educational background ==
Hendler received his B.S. with honors from the New York University College of Business and Public Administration and his J.D. from New York University School of Law.

== Teaching awards ==
Hendler has received several teaching awards within New York University.

- 1994–1995 Undergraduate Teacher of the Year
- 1995 Eli Kushel Excellence in Teaching
- 1996 Citibank Award for Excellence in Teaching
- 1996–1997 Undergraduate Teacher of the Year
- 2000–2001 Undergraduate Teacher of the Year
- 2000 Outstanding Faculty Adviser of Beta Alpha Psi from the Arthur Andersen LLP Foundation
- 2001 Executive MBA Excellence in Teaching
- 2003 Executive MBA Excellence in Teaching
- 2005 Executive MBA Excellence in Teaching
- 2014 Stern Distinguished Award for Teaching Excellence
