= Sheldon Saul Hendler =

American scientist, physician and musician

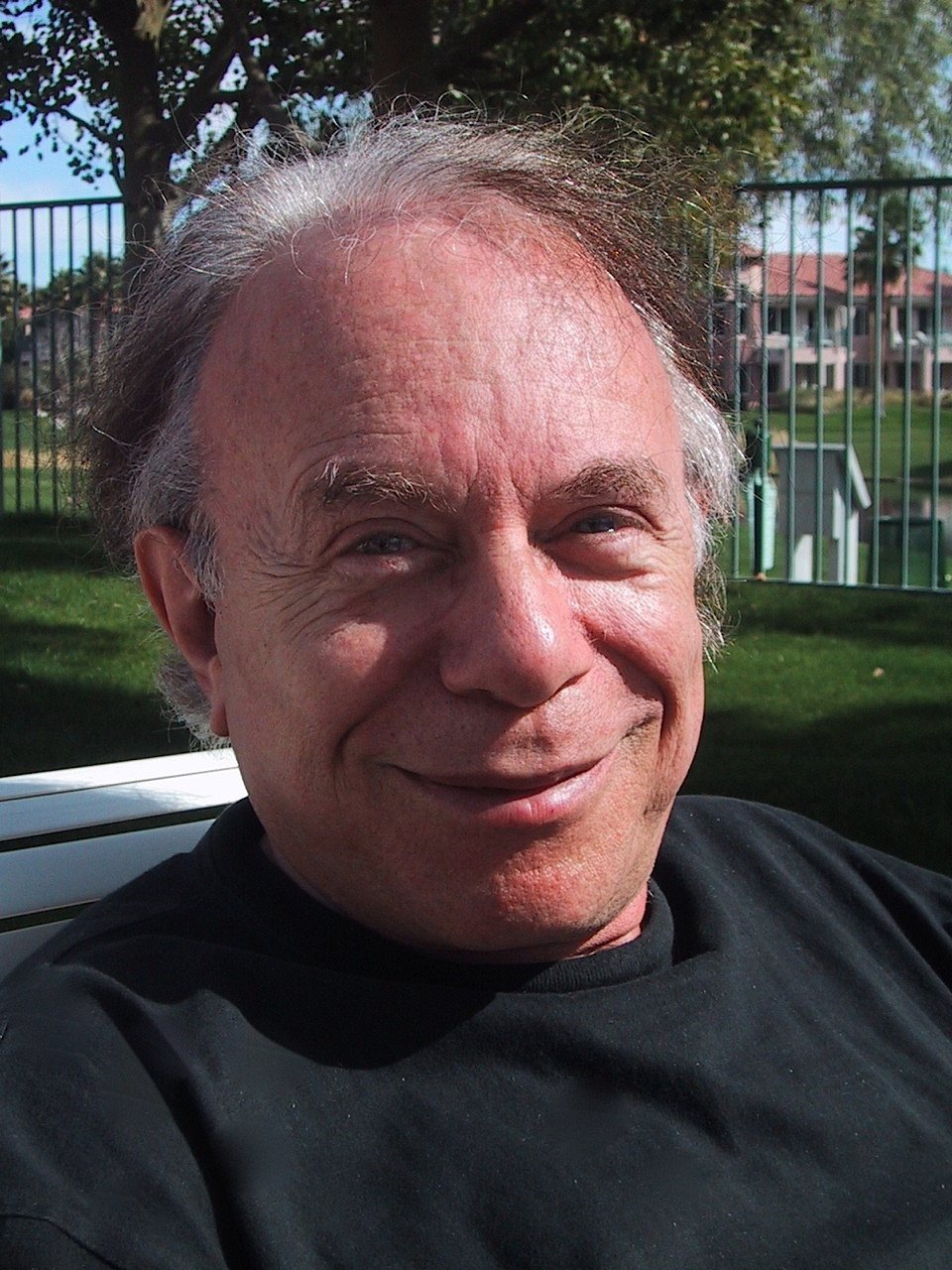

Sheldon Saul Hendler (12 May 1936 – 12 November 2012) was an American scientist, physician and musician.

== Early life and education ==
Hendler was born in Brooklyn, New York, and later lived and worked in New York City, New York and San Diego, California.

He attended the Boys High School in Brooklyn and later went on to Columbia University, where he studied for a bachelor's degree and later a Ph.D. in biochemistry. Thereafter he conducted his post-doctoral studies at University of California San Diego’s Salk Institute in La Jolla, California.

== Work and medical research ==
During his Ph.D. research work, Hendler conducted research on the structure of the nucleosome and contributed to the development of the first antiviral drugs.

During the early phases of the AIDS crisis, Hendler had one of the largest AIDS practices in California and was a member of the San Diego Community Research Group. Out of this work he developed special approaches to treating HIV infection.

Hendler sat on the Scientific Advisory Board of Archer Daniels Midland, the Pharmacy Nutrition Advisory Board of the AARP and the US Olympic Science and Nutrition Subcommittee.

Hendler was a co-author of a paper describing elastoderma, a condition involving elastin accumulation in the skin. he paper appeared in the New England Journal of Medicine in 1985.

Hendler helped found the Medical School at Universidad Autónoma de Baja California, Tijuana, and chaired their first Department of Biochemistry.

Thereafter Hendler returned to complete his M.D. at UCSD and his medical residency at Scripps Mercy Hospital, San Diego. Later, he was affiliated with UCSD as a clinical professor of medicine.

== Writing and publications ==
Hendler authored over 50 peer-reviewed manuscripts dealing with biochemistry and medicine.

- The Complete Guide to Anti-Aging Nutrients (1986)
- The Oxygen Breakthrough: 30 Days to an Illness-Free Life (1989)
- The Doctor's Vitamin and Mineral Encyclopedia (1990)
- The Purification Prescription (1991)
- The Doctor's Vitamin and Mineral Encyclopedia (1991)
- The Purification Prescription (1994)
- PDR for Nutritional Supplements (2001)

He was also the founding editor-in-chief of the International Journal of Medicinal Food

== Music ==
Hendler was also a jazz trumpet player. He composed the original musical score for the 1973 television series The Ascent of Man by Jacob Bronowski.

== Death ==
Hendler died on 12 November 2012, and is survived by his wife Joyce Marilyn Hendler and their son, Ross Hendler. He was predeceased by their other son, Seth Hendler.

== See also ==
Sheldon Hendler on IMDB
