= Margo Georgiadis =

American business executive

Margaret H. Georgiadis
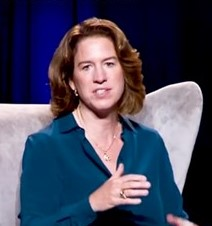
- Georgiadis (2017)
- Education: Harvard College; Harvard Business School

Margaret "Margo" Georgiadis is an American business executive who is the former president and chief executive officer of Ancestry.com for the years 2018 to 2020.

== Education and career ==
Georgiadis earned a BA in economics magna cum laude from Harvard College, where she was also Phi Beta Kappa. Upon graduating in 1986, she worked at McKinsey & Company, where she was a business analyst for two years before returning to Harvard to earn an MBA from Harvard Business School in 1990, where she was a Baker Scholar, meaning she was in the top 5% of her class. In 1990 she rejoined McKinsey, where she was eventually promoted to partner.

From 2004 to 2008, she worked as EVP of Card Products and CMO for Discover Financial, where she played a key role in taking the company public, managing consumer and business credit cards, its online business, and corporate marketing. Her impact at the firm transformed it from three years of receivables declines, culminating in a sustained 4%+ of receivables growth and top industry margins with sales increasing more than 25% to $93 billion. In 2009, she served as a Principal at Synetro Capital, a Chicago-based private equity firm.

From 2009 to 2011 she was Google's VP of Global Sales Operations. From April to September 2011, she served as Groupon's COO for a five-month stint, during which Groupon filed a Form S-1 in anticipation of its IPO. In 2011, she returned to Google to serve as its President of the Americas, leading the company's commercial operations and advertising sales in the United States, Canada, and Latin America.

In February 2017, Georgiadis succeeded Christopher A. Sinclair as Mattel's CEO. She was selected to lead the company in the hope of bringing "a fresh perspective on enterprise alignment and a female voice at the helm does reinvigorate the potential for a dramatic modernization of the Mattel operating model". Her strategy was to focus on Mattel's marquee brands such as Barbie, American Girl, and Hot Wheels while overhauling management, suspending its dividend, and developing plans to cut $650 million in costs. At the time of her departure, Mattel stock had gone down 50% since she became CEO. Ynon Kreiz was appointed Mattel's new CEO following her departure.

On April 19, 2018, Margaret Georgiadis was appointed president and CEO of Ancestry.com, allowing interim CEO Howard Hochhauser to return to his CFO and COO roles.

In 2020 Georgiadis announced she would be stepping down as Ancestry's president at the end of 2020.

== Other experience ==
She serves on the board of directors at McDonald's in addition to Ancestry.com. Previously she has served on the boards of organizations as varied as Amyris Inc., the Music Institute of Chicago, The Chicago Network, Nine West Holdings, the Ad Council, the Economic Club of Chicago, NorthShore University HealthSystem, and The Jones Group Inc.

From 2001 to 2004, she served on Chicago mayor Richard M. Daley's Council of Technology Advisors to advise on initiatives to raise Chicago's technology profile.

She is passionate about STEM education and has championed organizations that help women and girls pursue STEM careers such as Made with Code and Girls Who Code. She co-led Women@Google while she worked there.
