= Hendler v. United States =

- Court: United States Court of Appeals for the Federal Circuit
- Full case name: Henry Hendler, Paul Garrett and Tillie Goldring as Trustees for Henry Hendler and Irving Gronsky v. United States
- Decided: May 11, 1999
- Citations: 175 F.3d 1374; 48 ERC 1545

Court membership
- Judges sitting: S. Jay Plager, Glenn L. Archer Jr., Raymond Charles Clevenger III

Case opinions
- Majority: Plager, joined by a unanimous court

Laws applied
- U.S. Const. amend. V

Hendler v. United States, 175 F.3d 1374 (Fed. Cir. 1999), was a case where the Court of Appeals for the Federal Circuit found that although there was a taking, no compensation was due because the net damages were zero.

This case is a good illustration of how there are different factors which determine the economic equivalent of the compensation due under the Fifth Amendment. This case uses both set off benefits and severance damages to help determine the amount of just compensation due to the landowner after a taking.

== Parties ==
=== Plaintiff/Appellant ===
The Hendlers, the landowners.

=== Defendant/Respondent ===
The State of California.

== Background ==
After several attempts to begin, the court finally approved the claim as a good cause of action. The court of Federal Claims was to determine what just compensation was due.

== Facts ==
Upstream from the plaintiff's property there were some acid pits, which overflowed as a result of some heavy rain. The State of California undertook to clean it up. The Government then entered upon the plaintiff's land, without consent and over their objection, for the purpose of sinking wells for monitoring ground water migration.

Fifty feet by 50 feet (15 by 15 m) of sink wells and a 16-foot-wide (4.9 m) easement were placed on the plaintiff's property. The testimony of the Government found three types of special benefits: (1) investigatory, (2) characterization and remediation of contaminated water.

== Prior history ==
In the damages trial, the court heard evidence of the value of the well site and access corridor easements, and whether or not the remaining property was harmed or benefited from the Government's activity on their land. The court found that there were no compensable severance damages. The Court also found that the remaining property received "special benefits" which outweighed the value of the easement taken. The court concluded that the plaintiffs were entitled to no payment for just compensation.

Plaintiffs now appeal the determination of the amount of just compensation.

== Legal analysis ==
=== Issue ===
Whether the plaintiff's are entitled to payment for their land taken under just compensation.

=== Argue ===
Plaintiff argues that the trial court erred by basing value on the Government's actual use instead of the Plaintiff scope of use permitted analysis.

They additionally argued the court determination that the special benefits as a result of the land taken was erroneous. Arguing, special benefits cannot offset the value of the easement taken.

Further, plaintiff argues that the investigation benefit was a general benefit, because the intended beneficiaries were the properties downstream.

Finally, the plaintiff contends that the government activities made their remaining property unmarketable or at least depreciated.

=== Rule ===
Federal Law permits offsetting the value of the part taken by any special benefit. Special benefits are those which inure specifically to the landowner who suffered the taking and are associated with the ownership of the remaining land.

The fact that others benefit from the government activities does not make the benefits general.

In cases of partial taking, just compensation includes the value of the part taken and the damage to the remainder resulting from the taking. Where the plaintiff bears the burden of proving severance damages to the remaining property.

=== Hold ===
The investigation benefit was a special benefit to the property because it was unique. The value of the special benefit was over $100,000. This amount outweighs the value of the land taken, therefore, once the special benefit is deducted from the value of the land taken, the landowners are not entitled to just compensation.

There were no proven severance damages to the remainder of the property.

Therefore, no payment is required under just compensation for the taking.

=== Reasoning ===
The Government must only put the owner in the place they were before the taking. Therefore, when the problem was not created by the Government but government intrusion was necessary to correct the problem for the benefit of the general public, it is not inequitable to balance against the harm caused the landowner by the Government's remedial action any special benefit which accrue to the land.

The Court found that the property value was decreased from a reason separate and apart from the government activities. Further, the access order did not materially interfere with the subject property's daily use and did not result in damages.
