= Edison's Phonograph Doll =

Children's toy doll

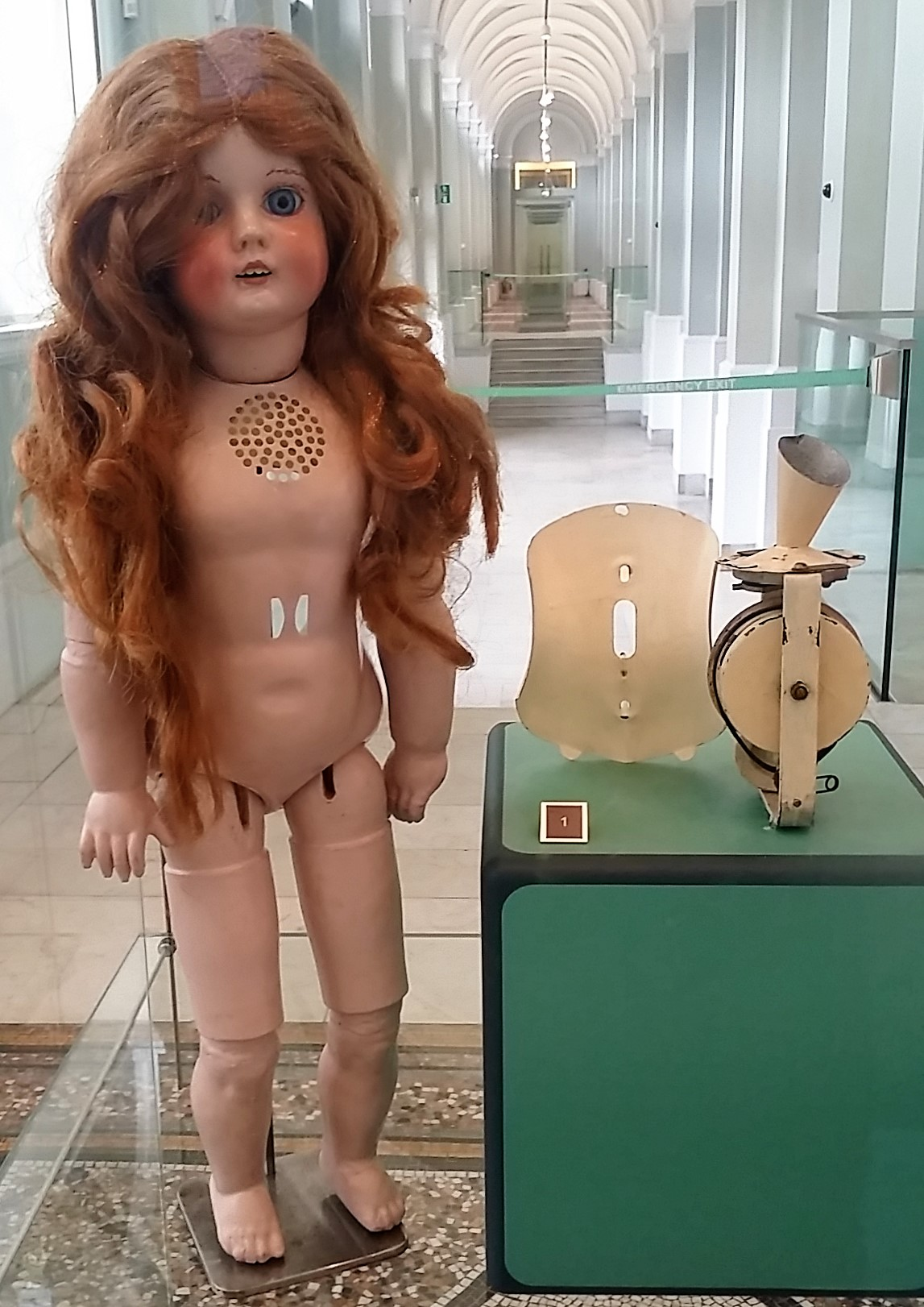
Example of an Edison Phonograph doll, 1890. The phonograph mechanism housed in the body has been removed and is displayed alongside.

Edison's Phonograph Doll is a children's toy doll developed by the Edison Phonograph Toy Manufacturing Company (founded by William W. Jacques and Lowell Briggs in 1887) and introduced in 1890. The original doll was invented by Thomas Edison in 1877. The 22-inch doll featured a miniature removable phonograph that played a single nursery rhyme. Even though it had spent several years in experimentation and development, the Edison Talking Doll was a sales failure and was only marketed for a few short weeks in early 1890. A handle had to be cranked each time for it to play. Also, the ring-shaped wax records wore out quickly and were prone to cracking and warping. Additionally, many children (and some adults) reportedly found the dolls and recordings frightening. Edison referred to the dolls as his "little monsters".

In 2015, the Lawrence Berkeley National Laboratory, in collaboration with the Library of Congress, developed a three-dimensional optical scanning system called IRENE-3D, which allowed surviving discs to be scanned and the audio to be reproduced. As of April 2015, eight recordings had been digitized and may be heard at the National Park Service website.

== Gallery ==
Twinkle, twinkle little star (1888)

Hickory Dickory (1889)

Twinkle, twinkle little star (1890)

There was a little girl (1890)

Twinkle, twinkle little star (1891)

Little Jack Horner (1890)

Now I lay me down to sleep (1890)

Jack and Jill (1890)
