= Seismic Handler =

Seismic Handler (SH) is an interactive analysis program for preferably continuous waveform data. It was developed at the Seismological Observatory Gräfenberg and is in use there for daily routine analysis of local and global seismic events. In original form Seismic Handler was command line based, but now an interactive version is available.

== Main features ==
- Reading traces from continuous data streams in Steim-compressed MiniSEED files. Additionally supported formats are event data from GSE, AH and Q (private format of SH) files.
- Zoom in and out traces in time and amplitude.
- Application of a set of standard filters (simulation filters and Butterworth filters) on broadband input traces.
- Reading phases on original or preprocessed traces.
- Determination of signal/noise ratio
- Computation of teleseismic beam traces using array-beamforming or FK-algorithm, determination of slowness and back-azimuth of an incoming wavefront.
- Location of teleseismic events using global travel timetables based on array methods or relative travel times, determination of focal depth using depth phases
- Location of regional and local events using LocSAT program, flexible interface provided for integration of own location programs.
- Integration of an own external programs (e.g.: map display, phase diagrams).
- Displaying theoretical travel times.
- Determination of amplitudes and magnitudes (ml or mb and Ms).
- Saving analysis results into an output text file for further processing.
- Supported operating systems: Solaris and Linux

== Additional features ==
- Rotation of 3-component seismograms
- Particle motion diagrams
- Vespagram-like trace summation
- Trace spectrum display
