= Ruth Handler =

American business magnate and inventor (1916–2002)

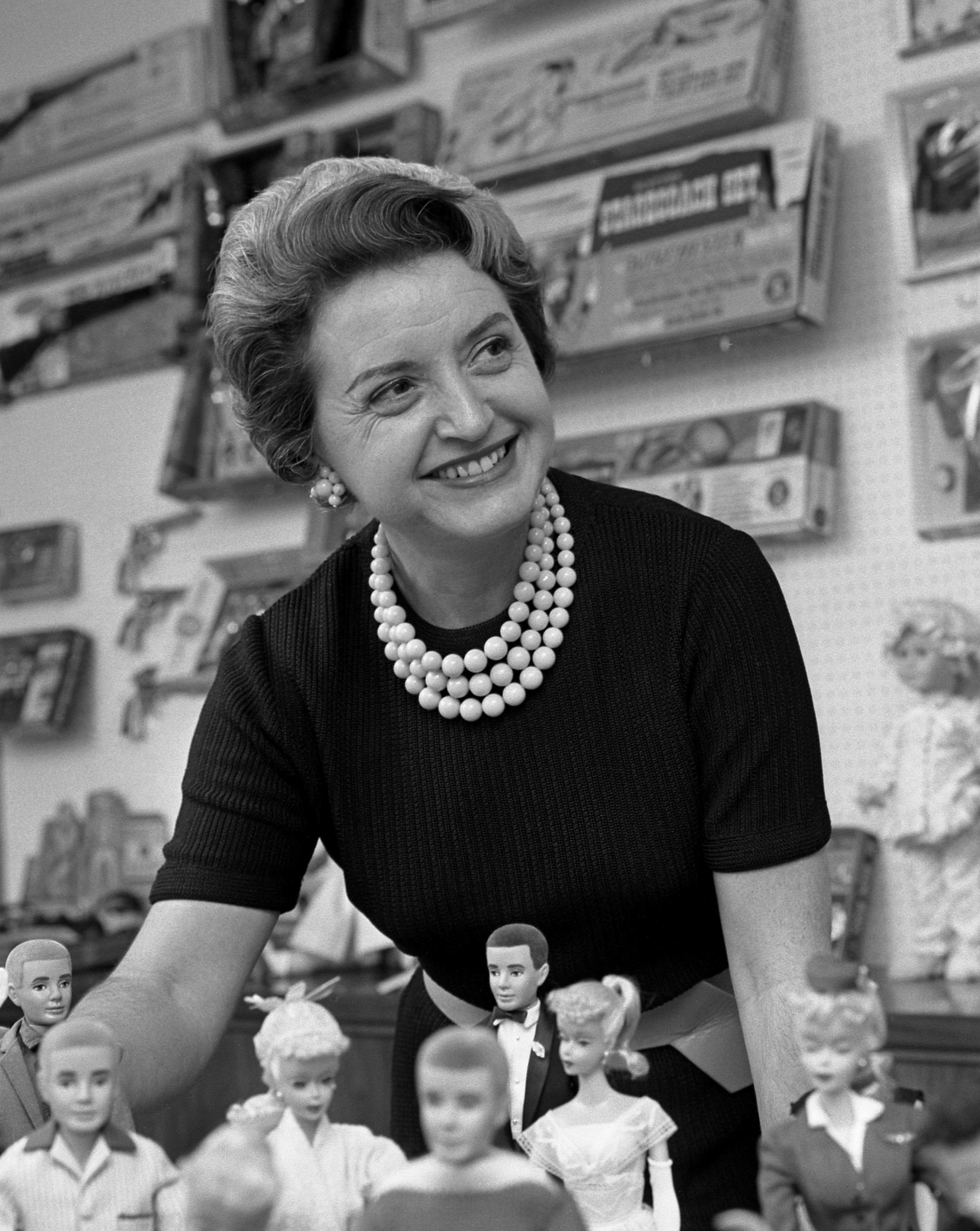
- Handler in 1961
- Born: Ruth Marianna Mosko; November 4, 1916; Denver, Colorado, U.S.
- Died: April 27, 2002 (aged 85); Los Angeles, California, U.S.
- Occupation: President of Mattel (1945–1975)
- Notable work: Barbie
- Spouse: Elliot Handler (m. 1938)
- Children: 2, including Kenneth

Ruth Marianna Handler (née Mosko; November 4, 1916 – April 27, 2002) was an American business magnate and inventor. She is best known for inventing the Barbie doll in 1959 and being co-founder of toy manufacturer Mattel with her husband Elliot, as well as serving as the company's first president from 1945 to 1975.

The Handlers were forced to resign from Mattel in 1975 after the Securities and Exchange Commission investigated the company for falsifying financial documents.

Handler was prominently characterized in the 2023 film Barbie.

== Early life ==
Ruth Marianna Mosko was born on November 4, 1916 in Denver, Colorado, to Polish-Jewish immigrants Jacob Moskowicz, a blacksmith and Ida Moskowicz (née Rubenstein). She was the youngest of ten children. When she was six months old, her parents sent her to live with her older sister Sarah. She stayed with Sarah until she was 19 and developed an enthusiasm for business by working at Sarah’s drugstore/soda fountain.

In 1932, Ruth fell in love with Izzy Handler, an art student. The summer of her sophomore year at University of Denver, she went to Los Angeles and landed a job at Paramount Studio. Ruth and Izzy married in 1938 in Denver. Returning to California, Ruth encouraged her husband to become known by his middle name, Elliot. Ruth returned to work at Paramount and Elliot was employed as a lighting fixture designer.

== Mattel ==
Elliot became interested in furniture-making and decided to make furniture from two plastics, Lucite and Plexiglas. At Ruth's suggestion, they started a furniture business where Ruth was in charge of sales, and she landed contracts with businesses such as Douglas Aircraft Company.

Business executive Harold "Matt" Matson joined the Handlers' company, which they renamed Mattel by combining "Matson" and "Elliot". (Elliot later said that they were unable to think of a way to include Ruth's name.) When sales fell during World War II, Mattel began making toy furniture. Its success spurred the company's transition to toy manufacturing.

=== Barbie ===
Observing her daughter Barbara and friends having fun with paper dolls and role-play adult scenarios, Ruth noticed a market void. Dolls available at that time were mainly babies and toddlers; no dolls were available that resembled adults.

During a trip to Europe in 1956 with Barbara and her son Kenneth, Ruth came across Bild Lilli, a German doll. In an interview with Mary G. Lord, author of Forever Barbie, Handler said that she saw the doll in Lucerne, Switzerland. However, the book points out that on other occasions Handler said that she saw it in Zürich or Vienna. The adult-figured doll was exactly what Ruth had in mind. She purchased three, gave one to her daughter, and took the others to Mattel. The Lilli doll was based on a popular character in a satirical comic strip drawn by Reinhard Beuthin for the newspaper Bild. The Lilli doll was first sold in 1955 in Germany, and although initially sold to adults, it became popular with children who enjoyed dressing it in outfits that were available separately.

On return to the United States, Handler redesigned the doll with help from local inventor-designer Jack Ryan. She named the doll "Barbie" after her daughter Barbara, and said that "Barbie" was from Willows, Wisconsin. Premiering on March 9, 1959 at the American International Toy Fair in New York City, the first Barbie doll cost $3 and was an instant hit. In its first year, 300,000 were sold.

The Handlers and Mattel later added a boyfriend for Barbie (named Ken, after the Handlers' son). Eventually a huge range of Barbie dolls was released, portrayed with more than 125 careers, and Barbie became known for versatility and fashion. The Handlers added cars, sports gear, clothes, and doll furniture to their Barbie products.

== Later years ==
Handler was diagnosed with breast cancer in 1970. She had a modified radical mastectomy, which was often done at the time to combat the disease. She spent less time at Mattel to focus on improving her health. Her loss of self-esteem affected her leadership and she lost control of her business. In a 1980 interview, she said: "When I conceived Barbie, I believed it was important to a little girl’s self-esteem to play with a doll that [had] breasts. Now I find it even more important to return that self-esteem to women who have lost theirs.”

Due to difficulties in finding a good breast prosthesis, Handler decided to make her own. With the help of new business partner Peyton Massey and under her new company, Ruthton Corp., she manufactured a more realistic version of a woman's breast called Nearly Me, aiming to boost women's confidence regardless of their health. The invention became quite popular; first lady Betty Ford was fitted for one after a mastectomy.

Handler received various awards for her philanthropy and business activities. She was chosen Woman of the Year in Business by the Los Angeles Times, inducted into the Toy Industry Hall of Fame by the Toy Manufacturers of America, received the Volunteer Achievement Award from the American Cancer Society and was the inaugural Woman of Distinction of the United Jewish Appeal.

Following several investigations into fraudulent financial reports, Handler resigned from Mattel in 1975. Investigations continued and she was charged with fraud and false reporting by the U.S. Securities and Exchange Commission. She pleaded no contest and was fined $57,000 (equivalent to $280,000 in 2025) and sentenced to 2,500 hours of community service. She blamed her illness for making her "unfocused" on her business.

Handler died on April 27, 2002 in California from complications during surgery for colon cancer. She was 85.

== Legacy ==
Handler is portrayed in the 2023 film Barbie by actress Rhea Perlman. In the film, the ghost of an elderly Handler resides in an office on the 17th floor of Mattel's El Segundo headquarters. There she meets the movie's stereotypical Barbie (Margot Robbie). Later, while advising Barbie, Handler tells her about her creation and how it related to her daughter, Barbara. Barbie then takes the name "Barbara Handler" as her own. The film stirred a wave of media coverage of Handler.
