= Russian bank (card game) =

Card game

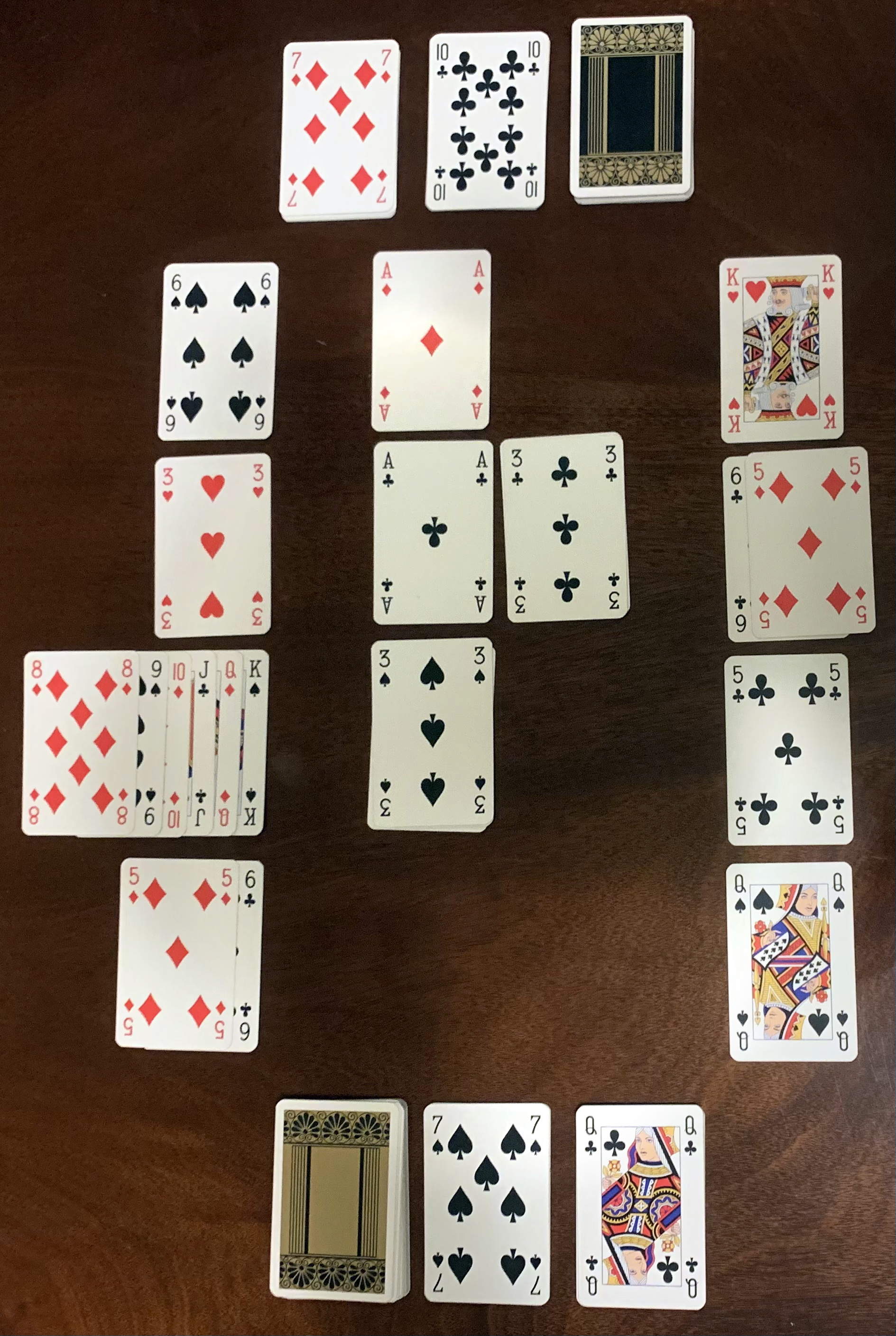
Russian bank, crapette, or tunj: a standard in-game setup

Russian bank, crapette, tunj or touch, historically also called the wrangle, is a card game for two players from the patience family. It is played with two decks of 52 standard playing cards. The U.S. Playing Card Company, who first published its rules in 1898, called it "probably the best game for two players ever invented".

The goal of Russian bank, like many card games, is for the player to get rid of forty-eight cards before their opponent can rid themselves of theirs. At the same time, it is required to build "piles" of suits, ace through king, in the center of the board. If a rule regarding the placement of piles is broken, the opponent may call "Stop!" (or "Tunj!", "Crapette!" or "Touch!") to end one's turn.

Commercially produced versions of Russian bank include Skip-Bo and Spite and Malice.

== Name ==
Russian Bank is also called double solitaire. It is also known as crapette or crapot in Brazil and Portugal, as crapette in France (crapat is Breton for ladder), as touch, and as tunj in the Middle East (Arabic: طنج, other transliterations are tonj, tonge, tunje).

== Rules ==
Player A
Talon; 35 cards (face down)	Waste pile		Reserve; 13 cards (top face up)
		♠♤
	♥	♥
	♦
	♣♧	♣♧
Reserve; 13 cards (top face up)	Waste pile		Talon; 35 cards (face down)
Player B

=== Start and setup ===
Each of the two players sitting opposite each other takes a pack of 52 cards, without jokers, shuffles it and lets the opponent cut it. The one who took off the highest card starts. The first player places their first thirteen cards in a "reserve pile", with the top card open, and the next four cards in a column (the "auxiliary columns") face up between both players. In the picture this is the right hand column. The same is then built up on the left side by the second player. There must be space between the two auxiliary columns for the eight aces, which will be placed there during the game (in the picture the two middle columns).

=== Gameplay ===
The first player then draws the remaining cards of their game one after the other, trying to either add each card to the "middle columns", or to add them onto the "auxiliary columns". The first card that the first player cannot fit in this way is placed in front of them as the beginning of their "waste pile" ("discard pile").

The second player follows, who does the same and still has the right to place cards that do not fit on the ace columns or the auxiliary columns on the opponent's reserve pack or on the opponent's waste pile if they match the suit, and are either one higher or one lower. The first player has the same right when the game continues. This allows a player to increase the opponent's card supply while reducing their own.

The top cards on each of the eight auxiliary places can be transferred to the column of aces as soon as they fit (i.e. they are the same suit, and one rank higher). It is generally advisable to use the open cards from the reserve pack first if possible, be it on the ace row or on the eight supply packs.

Once a player has run out of cards, on their next turn they can shuffle their talon and continue.

The one who is first with his cards at the end wins the game.

=== Middle columns ===
As the game progresses, as soon as they appear, the aces are placed in their designated places and form the foundation cards for families of increasing value. New cards are added on the aces in single increments in ascending order, ending with the kings.

=== Auxiliary columns ===
Cards must be placed on the auxiliary columns in red-black sequences, e.g. one could put either ♥J or ♦J on ♠Q. Auxiliary cards can be moved around, but, unlike solitare, they can only be moved one card at a time, and assuming spaces are available for each card in turn.

Note, the early versions of the game had auxiliary columns being built in the same suit in descending order on the auxiliary columns, although this is no longer common.

A variation exists whereby instead of a column of four face-up cards, a player first places one or two rows of four face-down cards and then one face-up card on each face-down card.

=== Compulsory moves, and Stop! or Tunj! ===
If a player fails to make a "compulsory move", the opponent can shout "Stop!", "Tunj!" or "Crapette!". The player's turn ends immediately and it is his opponent's turn. The "compulsory moves", in order of required preference, are as follows, assuming possible:

- Playing the top card of your reserve to a foundation (the open reserve card takes precedence over all others)
- Playing any other available card to a foundation (building the families on the aces takes precedence over any other possible move)
- Playing your open reserve card to the auxiliary columns

In some versions these rules apply if the player simply touches a card that cannot legally be moved, for example, moving any card that is not available or does not fit.

If a card has been placed illegally, it must be reversed before the opponent's turn begins.

== See also ==
- Nerts
- Skip-Bo
- Spite and malice
- List of patiences and solitaires
- Glossary of patience and solitaire terms
