= Mattel =

American multinational toy manufacturing and entertainment company

Mattel, Inc.
- Logo used since 2019

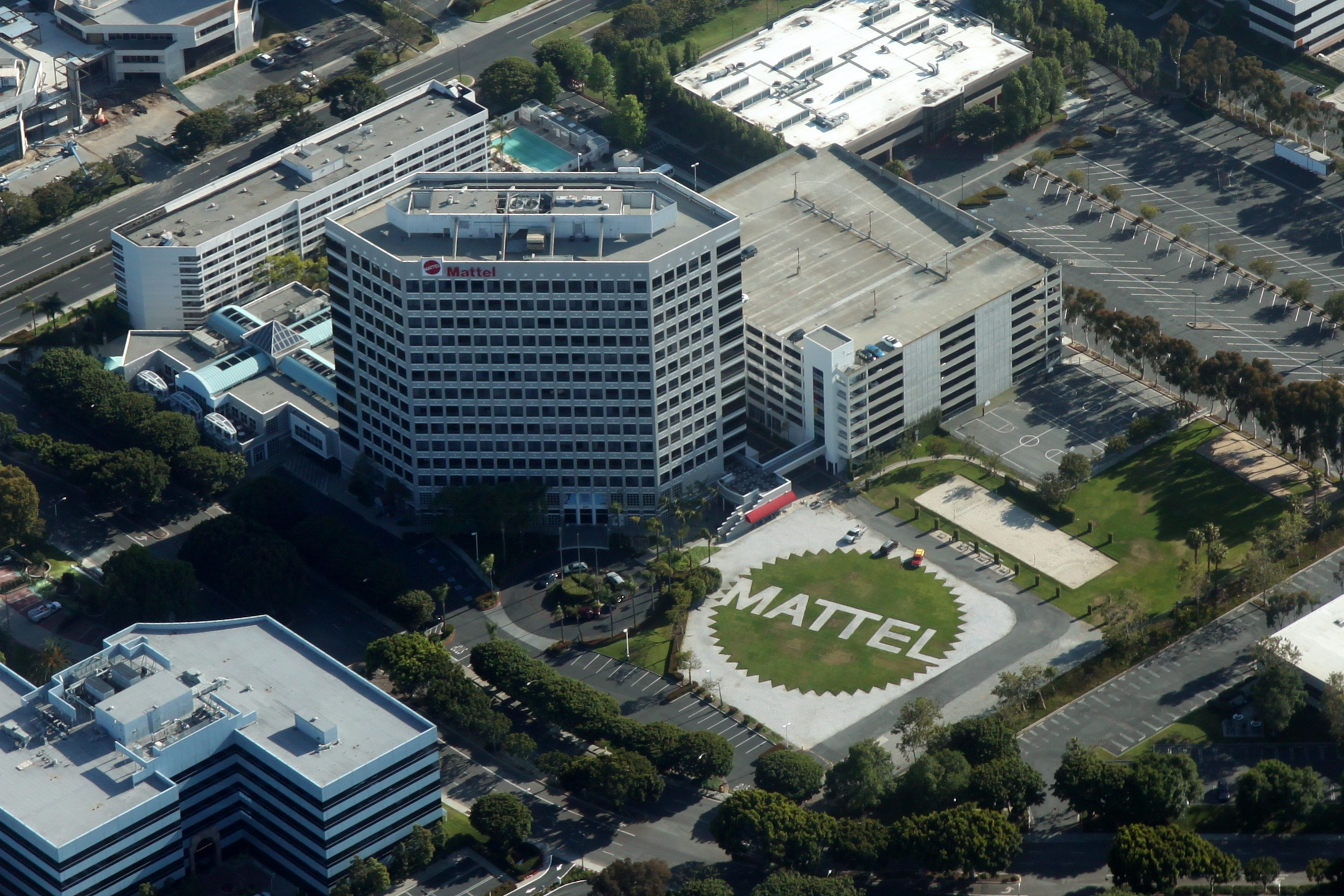
- Headquarters in El Segundo, California
- Formerly: Mattel Creations (1945–1948)
- Type: Public
- Traded as: Nasdaq: MAT; S&P 400 component; NYSE: MAT (1963–2009)
- Industry: Toys and Entertainment
- Founded: January 1945; 81 years ago, in Los Angeles, California, United States
- Founders: Harold Matson; Ruth Handler; Elliot Handler
- Headquarters: El Segundo, California, United States
- Area served: Worldwide
- Key people: Roger Lynch (chairman and CEO); Steve Totzke (president and COO)
- Products: List: Toys; Dolls; Action figures; Model cars; Card games
- Brands: Various: American Girl; Barbie; Barney; Bob the Builder; Enchantimals; Ever After High; Fireman Sam; Fisher-Price; Hot Wheels; Matchbox; Masters of the Universe; Max Steel; Mega; Monster High; My Scene; Pictionary; Pingu; Polly Pocket; Princess of Power; Thomas & Friends; U.B. Funkeys; Uno; Whac-A-Mole
- Revenue: ▼US$5.35 billion (2025)
- Operating income: ▼US$546 million (2025)
- Net income: ▼US$398 million (2025)
- Total assets: ▲US$6.64 billion (2025)
- Total equity: ▼US$2.23 billion (2025)
- Number of employees: 31,000 (2025)
- Divisions: Mattel Studios; Mattel Digital Studios
- Subsidiaries: Mattel163
- Website: shop.mattel.com; corporate.mattel.com

Mattel, Inc. is an American multinational toy manufacturing and entertainment company headquartered in El Segundo, California. Founded in Los Angeles by Harold Matson, Ruth Handler, and Elliot Handler in January 1945. Mattel has a presence in 35 countries and territories. Its products are sold in more than 150 countries.

Mattel is the world's second-largest toy manufacturer by revenue, after the Lego Group. Barbie was named the top global toy property and Hot Wheels was named the top-selling global toy by the NPD Group in 2020 and 2021.

== History ==
=== Origins and early years ===
Businessman Harold "Matt" Matson, together with the married couple Ruth Handler and Elliot Handler, founded Mattel as Mattel Creations in January 1945, in a garage in Los Angeles. The name "Mattel" is a portmanteau of "Matson" and "Elliot". (Note: Former chairman and CEO of Mattel Bob Eckert said in 2013 that the founders could not fit Ruth's name into the company name.) The company began selling picture frames and later dollhouse furniture made from frame pieces. Suffering from poor health, Matson sold his share of the company to the Handlers in 1946, with Ruth taking over his stake. In 1947, Mattel had its first successful toy, a ukulele called "Uke-A-Doodle".

Mattel was incorporated in Hawthorne, California, in 1948. The company started advertising on television when it became the first sponsor of the Mickey Mouse Club series. The Barbie doll debuted in 1959, and it became Mattel's all-time best-selling toy. In 1960, the company introduced Chatty Cathy, a talking doll voiced by June Foray. The doll strongly influenced the toy industry, leading to pull-string talking dolls and similar toys flooding the market throughout the 1960s and 1970s. In 1961, Mattel introduced the Ken doll. The company went public in 1960 and was listed on the New York Stock Exchange three years later.

The Barbie Dreamhouse, made from cardboard and paper, was released in 1962. In 1965, the company introduced Astronaut Barbie, the first of many space-themed versions of the doll. That same year, Mattel built on the success of the Chatty Cathy doll when it introduced the See 'n Say talking toy, which spawned an additional line of products. In 1967, Mattel released a set of space-themed toys that included a character named Major Matt Mason.

On May 18, 1968, Mattel introduced the Hot Wheels brand (of scale model cars), which was created by a team that included a car designer and a rocket scientist. (Note: Attributed to multiple references:) That same year, the company introduced Christie, Barbie's friend and the company's first African-American doll. Christie was followed by a continuous line of additional Barbie-related characters over subsequent decades. In 1969, the company changed its "Mattel Creations and Mattel, Inc.: Toymakers" branding to simply "Mattel" and launched its "red sun" logo. Mattel also acquired a series of other companies during the 1960s.

In 1970, Hot Wheels created a sponsorship agreement with drag racing drivers Don "The Snake" Prudhomme and Tom "The Mongoose" McEwen. The racers' cars, a yellow Barracuda and a red Duster, were reproduced as Hot Wheels toys. That same year, Mattel formed a joint-venture film production company, "Radnitz/Mattel Productions", with producer Robert B. Radnitz.

In 1971, Mattel purchased The Ringling Bros. and Barnum & Bailey Circus from the Feld family for $40 million, but it retained the Felds in a management capacity. After experiencing financial difficulties in 1972, Mattel sold the circus corporation, despite its profitability.

In 1974, an investigation found Mattel guilty of issuing false and misleading financial reports, which led to the ousting of Elliot and Ruth Handler from the company.

=== After the Handlers ===
Arthur S. Spear, then a vice president at Mattel, took control of the company in 1975 and returned it to profitability in two years. In 1978, the Mattel Children's Foundation was created. Ruth Handler sold her Mattel stock in 1980.

Mattel debuted an electronics line in 1977 with a handheld electronic game. Its success led to the line's expansion with game consoles, and then the line was eventually incorporated in 1982. Mattel Electronics caused Mattel to take a $394 million loss the following year and almost file for bankruptcy.

In 1979, Mattel purchased the Holiday on Ice and Ice Follies shows for $12 million through Feld Productions. That year, Mattel also acquired Western Publishing for $120 million in cash and stock, which it sold to Richard A. Bernstein four years later.

In 1980, Mattel introduced its first Hispanic Barbie doll and its first African-American Barbie doll. In 1982, Mattel released He-Man and Masters of the Universe action figures, which inspired a three-issue comic book mini-series, an animated series and a live-action film.

The Felds bought the circus (and related companies) in 1982 for $22.8 million.

In the early 1980s, Mattel produced video game systems under its brands and licenses from Nintendo in several countries.

In 1985, the company launched the Barbie "We Girls Can Do Anything" TV advertising campaign to encourage girls to believe in themselves. It also released the CEO / Day-to-Night Barbie to celebrate women becoming CEOs. In 1986, Barbie joined the list of famous people painted by Andy Warhol.

New York City-based venture capital firms E.M. Warburg, Pincus & Co., and Drexel Burnham Lambert invested a couple of hundred million dollars in Mattel in 1984 to help the company survive. However, sales of the Masters of the Universe action-figure line declined, leading to lower revenue in 1987.

In the late 1980s, John W. Amerman—who joined Mattel in 1980 as head of its international division—was named the company's new chairman; in 1987, he improved the company's financial performance by focusing on core brands. This strategy was successful, as sales of Barbie dolls and accessories increased from $430 million to almost $1 billion between 1987 and 1992.

Mattel secured licensing and sponsorship rights from The Walt Disney Company in 1988 to create a new line of infant and preschool plush toys, to sponsor attractions, and to develop and sell toys at three Disney theme parks. Mattel also negotiated exclusive rights to sell dolls, stuffed characters, and preschool toys based on Disney characters. On January 31, 1988, Mattel shut down its operations in the Philippines. The company shifted the distribution and sales of Mattel-branded toys and games to Richprime Global, Inc. (formerly Richwell Trading Corporation). Mattel returned to working with Disney the following year. In 1989, Mattel purchased Corgi Toys.

Mattel moved its headquarters from Hawthorne to its current location in El Segundo, in Los Angeles County, beginning in 1990.

==== Acquisitions: International Games, Fisher-Price, Pleasant Company, Bluebird Toys ====
In 1992, Mattel created its first President Barbie. The Barbie character has run for president seven times since 1992, and an all-ticket version was released in 2016.

On October 8, 1992, Mattel opened its first production factory in Indonesia at the Jababeka Industrial Park in Cikarang, West Java (as the west plant), and expanded by opening a new plant in 1997 (as the east plant). The west plant is now the main factory for the Hot Wheels 5-car pack edition, and the east plant is now the main factory for Barbie dolls.

Mattel entered the gaming business in 1992 by purchasing International Games, creators of Uno and Skip-Bo. The company purchased Fisher-Price, Inc. on August 20, 1993, and Tyco Toys, Inc. (owners of the Matchbox and Dinky Toys brands) in 1997. In 1998, Mattel acquired Pleasant Company (creators of the American Girl brand) and Swindon, England-based toymaker Bluebird Toys (along with its most valuable property, Polly Pocket). In the same year, the first American Girl retail store opened for business in Chicago.

In 1996, the Fisher-Price Little People toys underwent a redesign: increased the resemblance to real children with different skin colors; added the figures' sculpted arms and hands; and added greater detail on the face, hair, and clothes. Also in the next year, Mattel acquired View-Master, and Hot Wheels partnered with NASCAR drivers Kyle Petty and Jack Baldwin, leading to the production of the first NASCAR-themed vehicles.

In 1998, Mattel donated $25 million to help rebuild the University of California, Los Angeles (UCLA) children's hospital, which was later renamed the UCLA Mattel Children's Hospital. The Barbie doll was inducted into the National Toy Hall of Fame that year. The same year, Mattel purchased Bluebird Toys.

Mattel purchased The Learning Company (formerly SoftKey) in 1999 for $3.5 billion, but sold it the following year at a loss. The company incurred a $430.9 million net loss that year.

On July 21, 1999, Mattel entered into an alliance with Japanese toy and entertainment company Bandai, which would allow Mattel to sell Bandai's toy lines in Latin America while Bandai handled Mattel's products in Japan.

Mattel earned the first grant for the Disney Princess doll license in 2000. In December 2000, Mattel sued Danish-Norwegian Europop band Aqua, claiming that their song "Barbie Girl" violated the Barbie trademark and turned her into a sex object, referring to her as a "blonde bimbo". This lawsuit was rejected two years later.

In 2000, Mattel signed a deal with Warner Bros. to become the master licensee for Harry Potter branded toys. This deal was extended in 2002; Mattel became the master licensee for DC and Looney Tunes toys for all markets except Asia.

In 2001, the first life-sized Hot Wheels car, the Twin Mill, was created. More than twenty life-sized cars were created, and all of them were inducted into the Hot Wheels Garage of Legends.

American Girl launched its "Girl of the Year" campaign in 2001 to highlight dolls with contemporary stories; each doll is only available for a year. In 2006, Mattel purchased Radica Games.

In 2002, the company closed its last factory in the United States; that factory had originally been part of Fisher-Price's outsourcing of production to China. A chain of events led to the distribution of millions of hazardous toys, including some contaminated with lead. On August 14, 2007, Mattel recalled more than 18 million products, with Louise Story of The New York Times providing close coverage. Many of these products had surface coatings that contained more than the U.S. legal limit of 0.06% lead by weight. Other toys were recalled because their strong, detachable magnets could endanger children. Mattel rewrote its policy on magnets, finally issuing a recall in August 2007. Because of exposed magnets, this recall included 7.1 million Polly Pocket toys produced before November 2006, 600,000 Barbie and Tanner Playsets, 1 million Doggie Daycare, One Piece, and thousands of other toys. In 2009, Mattel paid a $2.3 million fine to the U.S. Consumer Product Safety Commission for marketing, importing, and selling noncompliant toys. Mattel was noted for its crisis response by several publications, including PRWeek, the Los Angeles Times, Fortune, and Business Management.

On January 5, 2009, HIT Entertainment named Mattel's Fisher-Price division as the global master toy licensee for its Thomas & Friends franchise (outside of Japan), replacing RC2 Corporation's Learning Curve brand in the North American market as well as the HIT Toy Company for the TrackMaster range.

On September 13, 2009, Mattel's ticker symbol moved from the New York Stock Exchange (NYSE) to the Nasdaq Global Select Market (NASDAQ-GS large cap).

=== More acquisitions and brand portfolio expansion ===
At the end of 2009, Mattel signed a global licensing agreement with WWE to produce action figures and play sets along with props such as championship belts and masks, taking over from Jakks Pacific. The first line was introduced in January 2010. Having developed a diverse portfolio of toys in more than 50 global markets and being consistently ranked as the top action-figure property in the United States, Mattel launched multiple collaborations— for example, WWE and Ghostbusters, as well as WWE and Masters of the Universe. The partnership deal was extended multiple times, most recently in 2025.

On June 11, 2010, Mattel launched Monster High, a fashion-doll line featuring the teenage children of famous and well-known monsters such as Dracula, Frankenstein, Medusa, Werewolf and The Mummy. This line led to popularity and cult-following success, which Mattel translated into two spin-offs, each with a different focus than Monster High: Ever After High in 2013 and Enchantimals in 2017. In 2011, a life-sized Hot Wheels car set a new world record for a jump made by a four-wheeled vehicle at the 100th anniversary of the Indianapolis 500 (Indy 500) race. The 332-foot jump broke the previous 301-foot record set in 2009.

Mattel agreed to purchase HIT Entertainment from Apax Partners on October 24, 2011, for $680 million; this agreement excluded its share of the Sprout channel (later known as Universal Kids), which would be completed on February 1, 2012, for $680 million, and be managed under Mattel's Fisher-Price unit. In 2012, Mattel introduced a new doll, Ella, for the Barbie line. The doll was bald, and it was distributed directly through hospitals to children experiencing hair loss because of cancer and other diseases. That same year, Mattel purchased HIT Entertainment. On October 16, 2013, after reports of high profitability, Mattel launched an in-house film studio, Mattel Playground Productions, through which it produced original films, television shows, web series, live events, and games.

Fortune Magazine named Mattel one of the top 100 companies to work for in 2013, noting that only 1,292 positions were filled out of 164,045 job applications during the previous year, and that more than 1,000 employees had been with the company longer than 15 years.

On February 28, 2014, Mattel acquired Mega Brands. In February 2015, an upgraded View-Master—to provide a virtual reality (VR) viewing experience—was announced through a partnership with Google Cardboard. On April 16, 2015, Mattel announced a partnership with invention platform Quirky to crowdsource several products.

The next year, Mattel acquired Fuhu—the maker of Nabi tablets and other technology-driven hardware—in a bankruptcy proceeding for $21 million.

Mattel added a princess-themed Barbie line in 2010. Barbie sales plummeted in 2012, prompting a shift away from the Disney Princess line. Mattel had sold only Cinderella, Ariel, Belle, and the two Frozen princesses (Anna and Elsa) around its last year of the Disney license in early 2016. With these competing lines and an expiration of the brand license at the end of 2015, Disney gave Hasbro a chance to gain the license given Hasbro's work on Star Wars, which led to a license for the Descendants franchise. Disney Consumer Products also attempted to evolve the brand from "damsels" to "heroines". In September 2014, Disney announced that Hasbro would be the licensed doll maker for the Disney Princess line, starting on January 1, 2016.

On March 30, 2016, Mattel formed a "senior head" division called Mattel Creations to centralize its multiplatform content output. In the process, the production teams and operations of Mattel Playground Productions, HIT Entertainment, and the American Girl content-creation team in Middleton, Wisconsin were absorbed by Mattel Creations the following day. On July 19, 2016, NBCUniversal announced Mattel's license acquisition to produce toys based on the Jurassic Park franchise after Hasbro's rights expired in 2017.

While formerly associated with content production, as of 2020, Mattel Creations began to operate as an e-commerce and content platform for Mattel, Inc. In April 2020, the company released a Thomas & Friends special titled "The Royal Engine" to celebrate the franchise's 75th anniversary, featuring animated versions of Queen Elizabeth and a young Prince Charles introduced by the Duke of Sussex. In the same month, the new Basquiat Barbie was introduced, featuring the work of the artist Jean-Michel Basquiat. Mattel also created an online resource, "Mattel Playroom", to provide free games, activities, coloring sheets, do-it-yourself (DIY) project resources for parents/caregivers, and other resources to help families during the COVID-19 pandemic.

=== Hasbro's attempted takeover and Mattel163 ===
Former Google executive Margo Georgiadis was announced as Mattel's CEO on January 17, 2017. On November 10, 2017, The Wall Street Journal reported that Hasbro had made a takeover offer for Mattel, with Hasbro worth about $11 billion at the time and Mattel worth about $5 billion. Mattel rejected the offer less than a week later, according to Reuters.

On January 29, 2018, Mattel and NetEase—a Chinese internet technology and video game company—formed a joint-venture mobile publishing and development studio, Mattel163, aimed at creating apps based on Mattel's key brands. That same year, American Girl released the "Create Your Own" service, allowing children to create a doll from scratch and customize all aspects, including facial features, hair, accessories and outfits, and the doll's favorite places and hobbies.

=== Company reorganization and production partnerships ===
In January 2015, board member Christopher Sinclair replaced CEO Bryan Stockton, which was followed by two-thirds of senior executives resigning or receiving layoffs.

On April 19, 2018, Mattel named former Maker Studios CEO Ynon Kreiz as chairman and replacement CEO for outgoing CEO Georgiadis, who proceeded to lead Ancestry.com (effective April 26, 2018). Two months later, the company laid off 2,200 employees partly because of the liquidation of Toys "R" Us in the U.S. Kreiz started a reorganization of Mattel, which included a new board of directors; in addition, a global franchise management group and executives having entertainment backgrounds were charged with finding new opportunities in existing markets.

On 30 August 2018, Mattel announced the formation of a global franchise management division, to be led by Janet Hsu as chief franchise management officer. The division's mandate was to seek new commercial opportunities, as well as bring together consumer products, content development and distribution, digital gaming, live events, and partnerships. Hsu had previously been the CEO of Saban Brands, where Frederic Soulie last worked before being appointed as senior vice president of content distribution and business development in Mattel's franchise division on September 28, 2018. Hot Wheels celebrated its 50th anniversary the same year by recreating and selling the original 16 Hot Wheels die-cast cars as a set. In September of the same year, the Thomas & Friends franchise announced an alliance with the United Nations to introduce some of the organization's Sustainable Development Goals into the show's content; these goals included quality education, gender equality, clean water and sanitation, sustainable cities and communities, responsible consumption and production, and life on land.

On December 24, 2018, Mattel announced the loss of the DC Comics toy license to Spin Master, starting in the spring of 2020. Mattel's share price hit an 18-year low, closing at $9.25 per share.

Mattel reorganized the Mattel Creations division and renamed it Mattel Television on February 5, 2019; it would be headed by former Disney Branded Television programming executive Adam Bonnett. On June 30, 2020, Fred Soulie was "role-tripled" to general manager and senior vice president of the new division.

On March 9, 2019, Mattel celebrated the Barbie doll's 60th anniversary. As part of the anniversary celebrations, Mattel released 20 new role-model dolls in its Shero line to recognize influential women around the world. Mattel donated $1 from each doll sale to its Dream Gap Project Fund, which aimed to collaborate with other organizations on ending the problem of girls seeing themselves as less capable than boys.

In June 2019, Mattel released a new Hot Wheels ID line of cars, which contained embedded near-field communication (NFC) chips, so that customers could scan the cars and then build tracks, race cars, and view race statistics in combined digital and physical play. On December 16, Mattel released an update that allowed children to scan their cars into an app and then access different coding exercises. On August 19, 2019, Mattel announced a reboot of the He-Man and the Masters of the Universe brand, including new toy lines and brand extensions, a new comic book series, and a Netflix series.

In October 2019, Mattel released the toy line Hot Wheels Monster Trucks, which included a full line of die-cast vehicles and a national live-event tour, Hot Wheels Monster Trucks Live. The company also released a line of gender-neutral dolls called the "Creatable World". Mattel Children's Foundation announced and organized its second annual "Global Day of Play"—a company-wide community service initiative that focused on working with nonprofits and organizations globally to provide children a day that was focused on the impact of play.

Warner Music Group's Arts Music division arranged to become the distributor of Mattel's music catalog on May 1, 2020. Arts Music planned to make available hundreds of previously unreleased songs and new songs for existing brands, starting with the May 8th digital launch of the Thomas & Friends birthday album; this was managed by ADA Worldwide under the pseudonym label "Mattel–Arts Music". Also in May 2020, Mattel announced an initiative known as "Play it Forward" that focused on using Mattel brands to give back to the community. The first Play it Forward program was #ThankYouHeroes, which included a collection of action figures and Little People characters who represented people who worked essential jobs during the COVID-19 pandemic—such as doctors, nurses, emergency medical technicians (EMTs), and delivery drivers. On October 15, 2020, Mattel celebrated Fisher-Price's 90th anniversary by creating the virtual Toy Museum, which featured more than 90 different exhibits created by artist, set designer, and photographer Leila Fakouri. Mattel Creations was also launched that month: it is an e-commerce and content platform. It features limited-edition, curated items made in collaboration with pop-culture artists. The site's inaugural collection included the Artist Collaboration Collection, featuring the brands Barbie, Masters of the Universe, Hot Wheels, and Magic 8 Ball, as well as artists Gianni Lee, Cristina Martinez, Travis Ragsdale, and Distortedd.

On October 12, 2020, Mattel greenlit more than 140 new episodes and two specials for the Thomas & Friends franchise, in partnership with Corus Entertainment's Nelvana. However, Mattel retooled the project into a traditionally animated reboot titled Thomas & Friends: All Engines Go, which began on September 13, 2021. That reboot ended the show after 24 series/seasons over 37 years.

On November 20, 2021, Mattel launched a non-fungible token (NFT) marketplace to allow fans to purchase digital collectibles for its flagship brands Barbie and Hot Wheels.

Mattel again became the licensed doll maker for Disney Princess in January 2022, replacing Hasbro. The newest collection of dolls was available for purchase in January 2023.

On April 5, 2022, the Mattel board of directors, led by its CEO, Ynon Kreiz, named the company's chief commercial officer, Steven Totzke, as company co-president with Richard L. Dickson, alongside Totzke's original post; he would continue to report to Kreiz as before.

On May 25, 2022, Mattel launched the first transgender Barbie doll, inspired by Laverne Cox. In the same year, MINISO Group Holding Limited began its partnership with Mattel to produce Barbie-themed products, as well as become their official merchandise partner and official accessories supplier for Barbie globally. More than 120 variants of MINISO-Mattel collaboration products were officially launched by July 21, 2023, in China and the U.S., coinciding with the theatrical release of the film Barbie. The products were launched in several locations, including the following: MINISO headquarters in Guangzhou; MINISO's flagship stores in Changsha and Hanoi, Vietnam; the Chinese Mattel branch offices in Shanghai and Foshan; MINISO's flagship stores in Irvine Spectrum and Times Square; and Mattel's headquarters in El Segundo, California.

In April 2023, Mattel introduced a Barbie doll with Down syndrome in collaboration with the National Down Syndrome Society (NDSS); the company continued to expand its Barbie line to include more dolls representing people with Down syndrome and vision impairments in 2024. This initiative was part of Mattel's efforts to promote diversity and inclusivity, representing a wider range of children in its toy lines. In the same year, MINISO Group Holding Ltd. acquired a percentage of Mattel's shares, after successfully releasing the Barbie-themed collaboration products starting in 2023, as part of the Mattel-MINISO intellectual property (IP) partnership. The acquisition was officially announced at the Barbie 65th-anniversary celebration in April 2024, after the opening of the company's largest Barbie-themed store in Malaysia on March 30, 2024 (located at Berjaya Times Square in Kuala Lumpur).

In July 2024, Mattel was approached by the private equity firm L Catterton with an offer for a total buyout acquisition. This offer was ultimately declined. Also in July 2024, Mattel released a Sue Bird doll as part of the Barbie 65th-anniversary celebration, coinciding with the launch of the new "Give Limitless Possibilities" campaign for Barbie.

In November 2024, it was discovered on the social network X (formerly Twitter) that a brand of Wicked-themed dolls produced by the company inadvertently linked to an adult website instead of the website for the Wicked movie. Mattel apologized for the error, and it asked parents who had bought products with the incorrect website to destroy the packaging. Earlier the same year, one of the film's songs—Ariana Grande's version of "Popular"—was leaked via Mattel-produced singing dolls, causing a minor backlash.

In December 2024, Mattel released the Barbie Deluxe Style line, which focused heavily on the Barbiecore trend and Glam aesthetics. This line was released on the Mattel Creations website.

In May 2025, Mattel released the first Mattel Brick Shop building set, in collaboration with the Hot Wheels brand.

On June 2, 2025, Mattel announced the combining of its audiovisual production divisions, Mattel Films and Mattel Television (internally known as Mattel Television Studios), into a successor division named Mattel Studios, which would perform both functions; these divisions were discontinued as separate units within the company. This combination could be seen as a revival of the brand (and banner) that Mattel used occasionally between 2011 and 2013, in place of the main corporate logo in the closing credits of media products for the Monster High, Ever After High, and Polly Pocket franchises. Consequently, productions in development at both Mattel Films and Mattel Television would be absorbed into (or transferred to) the new division. Along with the announcement, Mattel promoted and transferred the head of its filming division (Mattel Films), Robbie Brenner, to the new division as president and chief content officer. Mattel Studios also named former Legendary Entertainment executive vice president of television and digital media, Jennifer Breslow, as the head of its television section; Mattel also named Darian Lanzetta, a former motion picture literary agent at the Creative Artists Agency (CAA), and Tom McNulty, former principal/president at MC Squared Media, as co-heads of its filming section. All three were expected to report to Brenner on Mattel's future media decisions.

On July 8, 2025, Mattel launched the first Barbie doll with type-1 diabetes, along with two new dolls: Peloton fitness instructor Robin Arzon from the U.S., and model Lila Moss from the UK.

In February 2025, Mattel reacquired the global license to produce DC Comics-themed toys, including action figures and play sets, through a multi-year agreement with Warner Bros. Discovery that begins during the second half of 2026. On August 14, Mattel launched a One-of-a-Kind Barbie Doll to celebrate its 80th anniversary, coinciding with the 80th anniversary of the Independence of Indonesia.

In 2025, Mattel announced that it was adding a Ken doll modeled after LeBron James to its Barbie toy line. The doll was an inch taller than a standard Ken doll.

In February 2026, Paramount named Mattel as its master toy licensee for Paramount's Teenage Mutant Ninja Turtles franchise, thereby replacing the company Playmates Toys. That same month, Mattel announced the acquisition of NetEase's stake in the Mattel163 game development company for $159 million. This acquisition granted Mattel full ownership of the business following previous collaboration with NetEase on the development studio.

=== Departure of Ynon Kreiz and Roger Lynch era ===
On September 30, 2026, Mattel announced a leadership transition, in which Ynon Kreiz would step down as chairman and CEO after eight years with the company to become the Co-CEO of Skydance Corporation. Mattel Board member and Independent Lead Director Roger Lynch, formerly of Condé Nast, was appointed to succeed Kreiz as Chairman and CEO.

== Media and entertainment ventures ==
Mattel has a history of media engagement since its beginning, through advertising products from its brands including Barbie, Monster High, and Polly Pocket; however, the venture into full-time entertainment began in May 1970, when the company partnered with producer Robert B. Radnitz to form a joint-venture film production company, "Radnitz/Mattel Productions". The franchise Masters of the Universe and its lead character He-Man had a cartoon series which was released between 1983 and 1985, and this series was followed by a live-action film in 1987. In 1986, Mattel launched a television syndication unit, MTS Entertainment, headed by John M. Weens, to distribute the syndicated television show Captain Power and the Soldiers of the Future.

The fashion-doll series, My Scene, with Mattel's flagship Barbie brand, launched in 2002 and soon involved a film franchise of DVD-exclusive/direct-to-DVD animated films. Polly Pocket had been created by Chris Wiggs in 1983 as a personal toy for his daughter Kate; starting in 1989, it was housed at Bluebird Toys, which Mattel acquired in 1998, and also followed suit.

With Lionsgate Studios, in addition to Lionsgate's acquired and merged companies Artisan Entertainment and Family Home Entertainment, Mattel's flagship Barbie brand was adapted into a series of successful animated direct-to-video films, which were transferred to Universal Pictures in late 2006. As of September 2021, the series has been jointly handled by Mill Creek Entertainment and NCircle Entertainment, with the latter solely for American retailers. Monster High followed Barbie some months after its launch in 2010, and many films were made based on the American Girl doll.

Mattel agreed to purchase HIT Entertainment without a stake in the Sprout TV channel (formerly PBS Kids Sprout and later Universal Kids) from Apax Partners on 25 October 2011, for $680 million; this purchase closed on February 1, 2012, making it part of Mattel's Fisher-Price division. HIT Entertainment was absorbed into Mattel Creations (later Mattel Television) in 2016, with HIT Entertainment's brands shared equally between HIT Entertainment and Mattel Films when the latter was formed on September 6, 2018.

On October 16, 2013, after reports of high profitability, Mattel launched an in-house film studio, Mattel Playground Productions (shortened to Mattel PGP or just PGP); the studio's purpose was to handle multimedia production and foster creative storytelling for Mattel's brands for global multiplatform distribution.

Mattel formed a division named Mattel Creations on March 30, 2016, to absorb Mattel Playground Productions, HIT Entertainment, and the American Girl content-creation team in Middleton, Wisconsin, as well as centralize Mattel's multimedia content output. Mattel Playground Productions was revived as Mattel Films on September 6, 2018; it was based solely on the company's brands, unlike its predecessor. The 2023 film Barbie was the first film released by Mattel Films. Mattel reorganized Mattel Creations, renaming it Mattel Television on February 5, 2019; the company hired former Disney Branded Television programming executive Adam Bonnett as its head.

Mattel announced that it started constructing the Mattel Adventure Park in Glendale, Arizona. The 9-acre park would feature popular Mattel brands, including Barbie, Hot Wheels, Thomas & Friends, and Uno. The park would have multiple themed roller-coaster rides, among other attractions. The park is expected to open in 2027.

Mattel announced a new game called Pictionary Vs. AI in September 2023. It is a version of the visual guessing game Pictionary where an AI model performs all of the guessing. A smartphone is used as the medium for the game. Players pull cards that assign a given word, and then the players sketch that word's meaning before letting AI guess what they have sketched.

Mattel announced plans to develop indoor water parks, called Mattel Wonder, in November 2025.

== Mattel Digital Studios ==
Mattel has expanded its presence in digital gaming, including video games, mobile games, NFTs, and Web3.

In 2017, Mattel and tech startup Osmo launched MindRacer, a Hot Wheels racing game for the iPad tablet computer.

The first game that Mattel released, Uno!, was originally launched for the Facebook Instant Games platform; this game was later available for the iOS and Android platforms.

Mattel's other mobile and video games include the following:

- Phase 10: World Tour (2019)
- Hot Wheels Infinite Loop (2019)
- Hot Wheels Open World (2020)
- Skip-Bo (2021)
- Hot Wheels Unleashed (2021)
- He-Man and the Masters of the Universe: You have the Power (2022)

In 2026, Mattel acquired full ownership of Mattel163. In August, the company announced the formation of Mattel Game Studios, a digital game development and publishing division within Mattel Digital Studios. Based in Los Angeles and Hangzhou, a team of approximately 300 employees develops, publishes, and operates games based on Mattel brands for mobile devices and creator platforms.

=== Hot Wheels ===
In September 2021, Mattel and developer Milestone released Hot Wheels Unleashed on the PC, PS4, PS5, Xbox One, Xbox Series X|S, and Nintendo Switch platforms. In this arcade-style racing game, based on the Hot Wheels toy line, players race customizable Hot Wheels cars in everyday settings such as kitchens and bedrooms. Players had the opportunity to submit their car designs in the "Hot Wheels Unleashed Design Battle"; the winning design was used to create a Hot Wheels toy available for purchase in December 2022. The contest ran between January 2022 and February 2022. More than 10,000 livery designs (i.e., custom paint/decal designs) for the Hot Wheels Rodger Dodger die-cast model were submitted using the in-game Livery Editor. The winning design was transformed into a real toy made available for purchase globally in December 2022.

In June 2022, Hot Wheels partnered with the Forza Horizon 5 video game to introduce a Hot Wheels expansion pack in-game.

=== He-Man and the Masters of the Universe ===
In April 2022, Mattel launched a new game on the Roblox platform inspired by the He-Man and the Masters of the Universe toy line and the 2021 Netflix series. Developed by the company Gamefam, He-Man and the Masters of the Universe: You have the Power is a player-versus-player (PvP) battle-style game available through Roblox on Xbox One, PC, and mobile platforms. In December 2022, Mattel made three Masters of the Universe characters available for purchase on Rec Room, a virtual-reality multiplayer online game. For a limited time in November 2022, Masters of the Universe characters joined Fall Guys, a free battle-royale-style game on Nintendo Switch, PlayStation, Xbox, and PC platforms. Mattel and video game developer Mediatonic later released Masters of the Universe figurines in the style of Fall Guys.

=== Barbie and Polly Pocket ===
In September 2022, Mattel's Barbie and Polly Pocket characters became available in Roblox's Livetopia, an open-ended role-playing video game. Players also had the chance to explore Barbie's Dreamhouse, in honor of the toy's 60th anniversary. It was announced that a Barbie-themed game called Barbie DreamHouse Tycoon would be coming to Roblox. Players could customize their characters and houses, as well as play career-themed games.

=== Minecraft ===
In January 2023, Mattel, Mojang Studios, and Cyclone Designs released the Minecraft Creator Series Camp Enderwood downloadable content (DLC) map, in addition to the new Minecraft toy line released the previous year. In Camp Enderwood, a free download from the Minecraft Marketplace, players engage in a summer camp experience with activities such as fishing and hiking.

=== Fortnite ===
In 2025, Mattel began launching themed multiplayer games on the Fortnite platform, starting with Monster High.

=== Roblox ===
Since releasing He-Man and the Masters of the Universe in 2022, Mattel has released additional titles on the Roblox platform, including Monster High in 2025 and Uno: Bridge Clash in 2026.

== See also ==
- Bandai
- Hasbro
- LEGO
- List of Mattel toys
- List of game manufacturers
- MGA Entertainment
- Spin Master
- Tomy
