= Toon Goggles =

American on-demand entertainment service

Toon Goggles logo with its mascot Eddie the Yeti

Toon Goggles is an American on-demand entertainment service for children that provides animated cartoons, live-action shows, games and music worldwide via the web and mobile applications on smartphones, OTT devices, smart TVs and tablets, led by CEO and co-founder Stephen Hodge.

Based in Los Angeles, California, Toon Goggles has developed partnerships with Sony, Samsung and Roku. Their children's content is compliant with COPPA (Children's Online Privacy Protection Act).

Toon Goggles allows animators to publish their shows for free. Animation rights holders are then provided with analytical data regarding the popularity of each show that they can present to network producers or investors.

In December 2014, Toon Goggles introduced 4K streaming of 18 series within their service.

== Features ==
Many of Toon Goggles customers use the service on children's tablets, especially Techno Source's Kurio7 and Oregon Scientific's MEEP!

- Some features include:
  - 6 show categories including boys, girls, action, comedy, preschool, and educational
  - 6 game categories including arcade, puzzle, sports, action, strategy and adventures
  - News stories and educational content for kids and tweens
  - TG Radio, a kid-safe music service with pop hits and soundtracks
  - Parental control switch to monitor viewing
  - UHD 4K streaming
  - Access over 3G/4G/Wi-Fi and ability to save cartoons for offline viewing
  - Localized interface in 18 different languages for global use

== Background ==
The Toon Goggles application is developed by Toon Goggles Inc., a start-up based in Los Angeles. In 2011, a demo website (www.toongoggles.com) was created to take to MIPCOM to show animation companies the exposure they could receive by placing their cartoons on the Toon Goggles service. The mobile application was created soon after. In 2012, the platform secured one of its first partnerships with Panasonic to appear on the VIERA Connect television. Toon Goggles has been pre-installed and promoted on a variety of devices for sale.

Stephen L. Hodge, Managing Director, spearheaded the creation of Toon Goggles in 2011. James R. Cahall, Chief Technology Officer, heads the service's technology development and feature integration, including the company's move to offer 4K streaming. Jordan Warkol, Director of Business Development was an actor for 15 years starting at the age of 4 playing 'Froggy' in the 1994 version of "The Little Rascals.".

== Business model ==
Originally a free service, Toon Goggles now follows the Freemium model, offering users free content with pre-screened advertising and the ability to upgrade to the subscription service with an ad-free model.

== Partners ==
Toon Goggles has the following partnerships.

- Samsung
- Panasonic
- Sharp Aquos
- Sony
- Roku
- Western Digital
- Vizio
- Wide Open West
- Seiki
- KD Interactive
- Techno Source
- Oregon Scientific
- Netrange
- Southern Telecom
- Hisense
- Idolian Mobile
- Nook
- U.S. Cellular
- Other Partners:
  - PacketVideo

== Lawsuit ==
In mid to late 2019, Toon Goggles was involved in the lawsuit Securities and Exchange Commission v. Toon Goggles Inc., et al. According to the lawsuit, co-founder Ira Warkol held at least five unregistered broker deals to around 400 investors from August 2012 to late 2016, raising over US$19 million. The lawsuit also stated that the commissions were performed under several entities, such as another start-up called NetKids and two divisions from Toon Goggles themselves: Dinomite Apps and Yeti Productions (both of which dissolved in 2015 and 2016 respectively). Toon Goggles also failed to get complete records of their investors, including the number of shares and money gained. Warkol neither admitted nor denied the allegations and agreed to a settlement stating that he had to return $2 million and pay another US$190,000 fine, along with being permanently banned from any future security sales. The case was settled on October 29, 2019.

A separate but similar preceding had the SEC accuse director of operations' Brendan Pollitz for facilitating broker-dealer registration violations. Pollitz agreed to a cease-and-desist order, paying additional fines of up to $43,589.
