= Speed Racer (film) =

2008 film by the Wachowskis

- Theatrical release poster
- Directed by: The Wachowskis (Note: Credited as The Wachowski Brothers, but was changed to The Wachowskis for the 4K re-release.)
- Written by: The Wachowskis
- Based on: Speed Racer by Tatsuo Yoshida
- Produced by: Joel Silver; Grant Hill; The Wachowskis (Note: Credited as Andy and Larry Wachowski, before being credited as Lilly and Lana Wachowski for the 4K re-release.)
- Starring: Emile Hirsch; Christina Ricci; John Goodman; Susan Sarandon; Matthew Fox; Benno Fürmann; Hiroyuki Sanada; Rain; Richard Roundtree
- Cinematography: David Tattersall
- Edited by: Zach Staenberg; Roger Barton
- Music by: Michael Giacchino
- Production companies: Warner Bros. Pictures; Village Roadshow Pictures; Silver Pictures; Anarchos Productions
- Distributed by: Warner Bros. Pictures
- Release dates: April 26, 2008 (Nokia Theater); May 9, 2008 (United States)
- Running time: 135 minutes
- Country: United States
- Language: English
- Budget: $120 million
- Box office: $94 million

Speed Racer is a 2008 American sports action comedy film written and directed by the Wachowskis, based on the 1966 manga series by Tatsuo Yoshida. The film stars Emile Hirsch, Christina Ricci, John Goodman, Susan Sarandon, Matthew Fox, Roger Allam, Benno Fürmann, Hiroyuki Sanada, Rain, and Richard Roundtree. The plot revolves around Speed Racer, an 18-year-old automobile racer who follows his apparently deceased older brother's career, choosing to remain loyal to his family and their company, Racer Motors, which causes difficulties after he refuses a contract that E.P. Arnold Royalton, owner of Royalton Industries, offers him.

A live-action Speed Racer film had been in development hell since 1992. In 2006, producer Joel Silver and the Wachowskis began production on the film. Speed Racer was shot in and around Potsdam and Berlin from June to August 2007.

Speed Racer premiered on April 26, 2008, at the Nokia Theater in Los Angeles, and was released in the United States on May 9, by Warner Bros. Pictures. The film received mixed reviews from critics and was a box office failure, grossing $94 million against a $120 million budget. In later years, the film would garner a strong cult following among filmmakers and audiences. It was nominated in three categories at the Teen Choice Awards.

== Plot ==
Speed Racer is a young man passionate about automobile racing. His parents, Pops and Mom, run Racer Motors, which involves his brother Spritle, their pet chimpanzee Chim Chim, mechanic Sparky, and his girlfriend Trixie. He also idolizes his late older brother Rex, who was killed racing in the Casa Cristo 5000, a deadly cross-country rally. Now starting his own career, Speed is rapidly gaining fame with his brother's Mach 5 and his own T-180 car, the Mach 6, while focusing on racing and family. One day, E.P. Arnold Royalton, CEO of Royalton Industries, offers Speed a luxurious lifestyle in exchange for racing with him; Speed declines due to his father's distrust of corporations.

Angered, Royalton reveals that key races have been fixed by corporate interests, including himself. As a show of power, Royalton has one of his drivers crash Speed's Mach 6 during a race, and also has Racer Motors sued for intellectual property infringement. Speed can retaliate through Inspector Detector, head of a corporate crimes division, since fellow racer Taejo Togokahn has evidence to indict Royalton but will only share it if Speed and the masked Racer X race for his team in the forthcoming Casa Cristo 5000, which could raise his family's racing business stock and block a Royalton buyout. Speed accepts but keeps it secret from his family, and Detector's team makes defensive modifications to the Mach 5 for the race.

After driving together and working as a team, Speed begins to suspect that Racer X is Rex in disguise. His family discovers that he has entered the race and agrees to support him. With Trixie and his family aiding him, Speed defeats many brutal racers bribed by fixer Cruncher Block and overcomes obstacles to win the race, while Detector's team arrests Block. However, Taejo's plan is revealed to be a sham, as his true intention was to boost his family's company to secure a higher price for Royalton's buyout.

Enraged by this news, Speed confronts Racer X, suspecting he is Rex. Racer X removes his mask, revealing an unfamiliar face and stating that Rex is dead, but advises Speed to stay true to himself and find his own reason to race. Speed returns home, planning to leave, but Pops expresses pride in him and admits his own stubbornness drove Rex away. Taejo's sister Horuko unexpectedly arrives with Taejo's rejected invitation to the Grand Prix. The Racer family unites and builds a new Mach 6 in 32 hours.

Speed enters the Grand Prix with Inspector Detector against great odds; Royalton has placed a $1,000,000 bounty on him, and he faces future Hall of Famer, five-time WRL champion, and two-time Grand Prix champion Jack "Cannonball" Taylor. Speed overcomes a slow start to catch up with Taylor, who cheats using a spear hook to tie the Mach 6 to his car. Speed reveals it to the cameras, exposing Royalton's crimes, causing Taylor to crash and lose, and eventually winning the race. As Racer X watches from afar, a flashback montage reveals him to be Rex, having faked his death, secretly attended his funeral, and undergone facial plastic surgery to protect Speed. He chooses not to reveal his identity to his family, opting to live with the consequences. The Racer family celebrates Speed's victory, and Taejo testifies against Royalton and his henchmen, leading to Royalton's imprisonment for his crimes.

== Cast ==
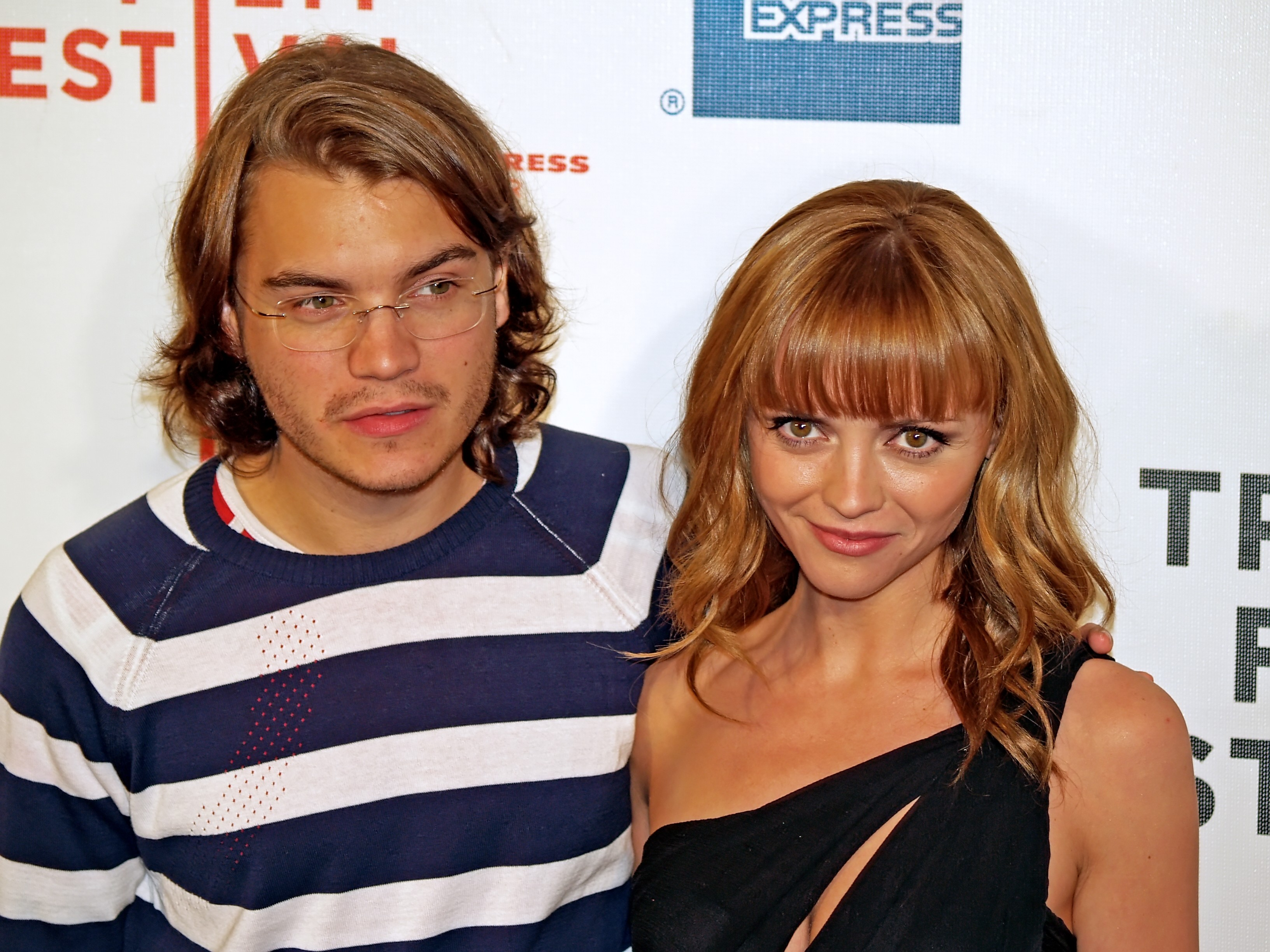
Emile Hirsch and Christina Ricci at the Tribeca Film Festival premiere

- Emile Hirsch as Speed Racer, a professional race car driver.
  - Nicholas Elia as Young Speed Racer
- Christina Ricci as Trixie, Speed's girlfriend.
  - Ariel Winter as Young Trixie
- John Goodman as Pops Racer, Speed's father.
- Susan Sarandon as Mom Racer, Speed's mother.
- Matthew Fox as Racer X / Rex Racer, Speed Racer's older brother and idol, who was presumed to have been killed in a race, and is tasked with exposing the corruption undermining the WRL.
  - Scott Porter as Young Rex Racer
- Roger Allam as E.P. Arnold Royalton, the corrupt owner and CEO of Royalton Industries.
- Paulie Litt as Spritle Racer, Speed's younger brother
- Benno Fürmann as Inspector Detector, head of the Corporate Crimes Division, Central Intelligence Bureau
- Hiroyuki Sanada as Mr. Musha, president and CEO of Musha Motors
- Rain as Taejo Togokahn, a rookie racer
- Richard Roundtree as Ben Burns, a race commentator and former racing champion
- Kick Gurry as Sparky, Speed's mechanic and best friend
- John Benfield as Cruncher Block, a professional race fixer and gang leader
- Christian Oliver as Snake Oiler, a shady racer who wears snakeskin racing clothes
- Ralph Herforth as Jack "Cannonball" Taylor, a superstar racer, 5-time WRL champion, 2-time Grand Prix champion, and future hall of famer sponsored by Royalton Industries
- Yu Nan as Horuko Togokahn, Taejo Togokhan's sister
- Nayo K. Wallace as Minx, a scientist and Racer X's girlfriend
- Melvil Poupaud as Johnny "Goodboy" Jones, a race commentator
- Ramon Tikaram as Casa Cristo Announcer
- Ben Miles as Cass Jones
- Peter Fernandez as Local Announcer
- Cosma Shiva Hagen as Jeannie
- Moritz Bleibtreu as Gray Ghost, a French racer for Eccran Establishment.
- Karl Yune as Taejo's Bodyguard
- Joon Park as Kakkoi Teppodama, a Japanese racer for Musha Motors tasked with taking out Speed at the Grand Prix for a million dollars. He is credited as "Yakuza Driver" in the end credits.
- Togo Igawa as Tetsua Togokahn, Taejo, and Horuko's father, and a corporate rival to both Royalton and Musha
- Chim Chim, Spritle's pet chimpanzee and best friend, is portrayed by two chimpanzees: "Kenzie" and "Willy".

The series' original English dubbing artists, Peter Fernandez and Corinne Orr, appear as race announcers. Andres Cantor also makes a cameo as a Spanish-language race announcer. Venezuelan professional racer Milka Duno also makes a cameo appearance as Kellie "Gearbox" Kalinkov, a Grand Prix racer who is tasked with eliminating Speed in exchange for collecting a bounty of a million dollars by Royalton.

== Production ==
=== Development ===
In September 1992, Joe Pytka announced that Warner Bros. held the option to create a live-action film adaptation of the 1960s Japanese anime and manga series Speed Racer, in development at Silver Pictures. In October 1994, singer Henry Rollins was offered the role of Racer X. In June 1995, Johnny Depp was cast into the lead role for Speed Racer, with production slated to begin the coming October, with filming to take place in California and Arizona. The following August, Depp requested time off from the studio for personal business, delaying production. However, due to an overly high budget, the same August, director Julien Temple left the project. Depp, without a director, also departed from the project. The studio considered director Gus Van Sant as a replacement for Temple, though it would not grant writing privileges to Van Sant. In December 1997, the studio briefly hired Alfonso Cuarón as director. In the various incarnations of the project, screenwriters Marc Levin, Jennifer Flackett, J. J. Abrams, and Patrick Read Johnson had been hired to write scripts.

In September 2000, Warner Bros. and producer Lauren Shuler Donner hired music video director Hype Williams to take the helm of the project. In October 2001, the studio hired screenwriters Christian Gudegast and Paul Scheuring for $1.2 million split between them to write a script for the film. Eventually, without production getting underway, the director and the writers left the project. In June 2004, Vince Vaughn spearheaded a revival of the project by presenting a take for the film that would develop the characters more strongly. Vaughn was cast as Racer X and was also attached to the project as an executive producer. With production never becoming active, Vaughn was eventually detached from the project.

=== Pre-production ===
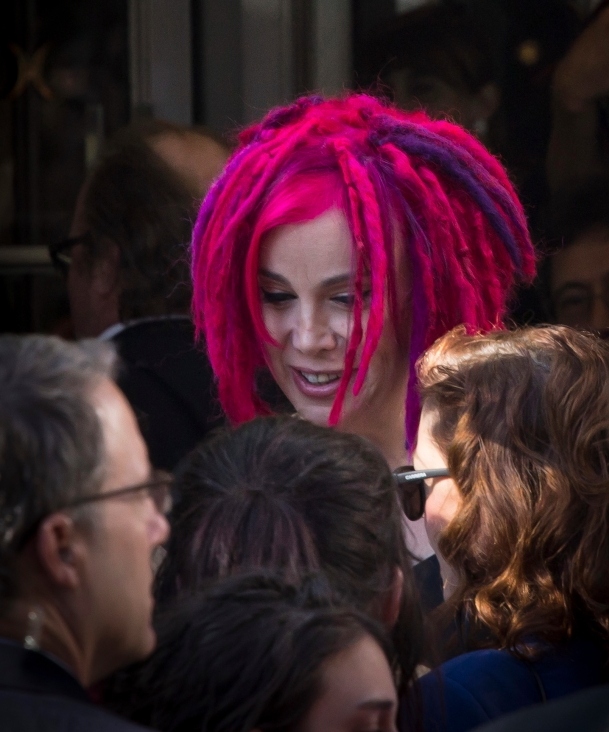
When directing Speed Racer, the Wachowskis took inspiration from avant-garde literature and pop art. Lana (pictured in 2012) described the film as an "assault [on] every single modern aesthetic".

In October 2006, the Wachowskis were brought on board by the studio to write and direct the film. Producer Joel Silver, who had collaborated with the Wachowskis for V for Vendetta and The Matrix Trilogy, explained that they were hoping to reach a broader audience with a film that would not be rated R by the Motion Picture Association of America. Visual effects designer John Gaeta, who won an Academy Award for Best Visual Effects for the Wachowskis' The Matrix, was brought in to help conceive a live-action adaptation of Speed Racer. Production was set to begin in summer 2007 in European locations for a summer 2008 release. In November 2006, the release date for it was set for May 23, 2008.

Producer Joel Silver described Speed Racer as a family film in line with the Wachowskis' goal to reach a wider audience. However, contrary to the apparent mainstream appeal of the project, the directors decided to take the source material in an avant-garde direction, declaring: "Okay, we are going to assault every single modern aesthetic with this film." According to Lana, representatives of Warner Bros. were initially "gleeful" that the directors chose to take on "a known entity that seemed like a family movie for kids", but when executives reviewed the work-in-progress, "they were like, 'Oh my god. Are you insane? What are you doing? This is the weirdest thing I've ever seen.' And we're like, 'Yes, that's the reason we're making it.'" For the Wachowskis, the project presented a unique opportunity to experiment with techniques of postmodernist cinema, as they believed the film's younger target audience would be more receptive to radical experimentalism than adults. In a 2012 interview, Lana said:

The whole impetus for Speed Racer came out of the fact that we are visually-thinking people. We go to art galleries and art museums all the time. We go into the Art Institute [of Chicago] and every room there, some paintings look completely and utterly different from the other rooms. But in the cinema, everything looks the same. And it's a really aggressive straight-jacket, aesthetically. We started talking about cubism, for instance, and we started talking about could you make a cubist film? And we realized that if you try to make a cubist film for adults, you will end up like Picasso, running from the angry mob when he first showed Guernica. They wanted to kill him. Literally. It's because adults... they reject change, and an aesthetic change is too aggressive a death for them. Every generation experiences aesthetic death, and when you really assault an aesthetic, people freak out. But we said that kids are okay with aesthetic change.

While planning out the film's pace and structure, the siblings embraced techniques of nonlinear narrative—such as stream-of-consciousness storytelling—from modernist novels like Ulysses (1922) by James Joyce and Purple America (1997) by Rick Moody, seeking to play with the conventions of cinematic language as those authors had done with prose. They deemphasized traditional cuts in favor of more fluid transitions, with the intention that scenes would "feel like this experiential flowing thing that was transcending normal simple linear narrative". The film's bright, colorful, smooth look is indebted to pop art, including paintings by Roy Lichtenstein and art photography by Andy Warhol, David LaChapelle, and Jill Greenberg. To achieve the desired visual aesthetic, Gaeta and effects supervisor Dan Glass developed a method of layering photographic and computer-generated imagery that they described as "poptimistic photo-anime", taking inspiration from animated films like The Castle of Cagliostro (1979), Tron (1982), Akira (1988), and Tarzan (1999).

=== Casting ===
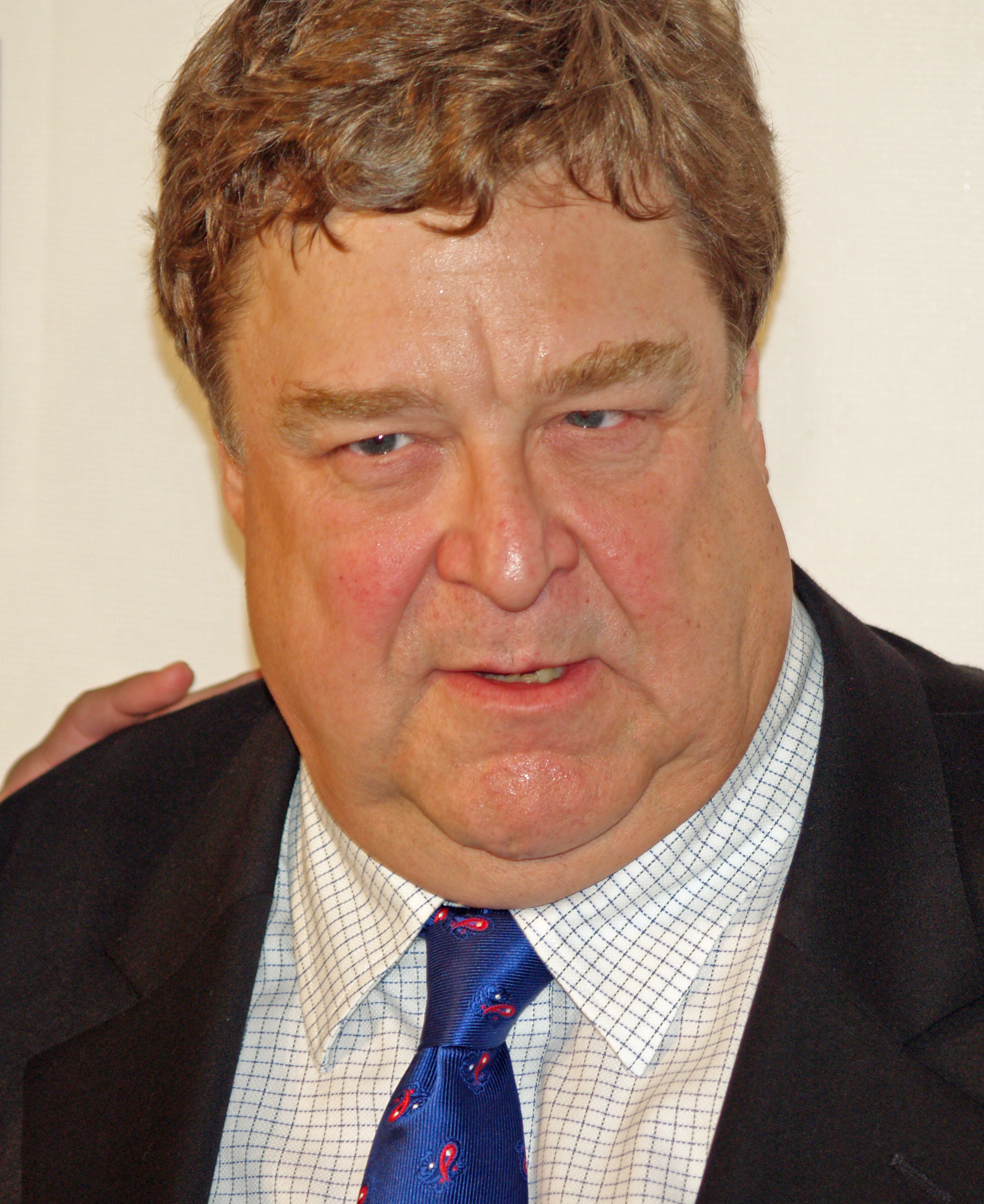
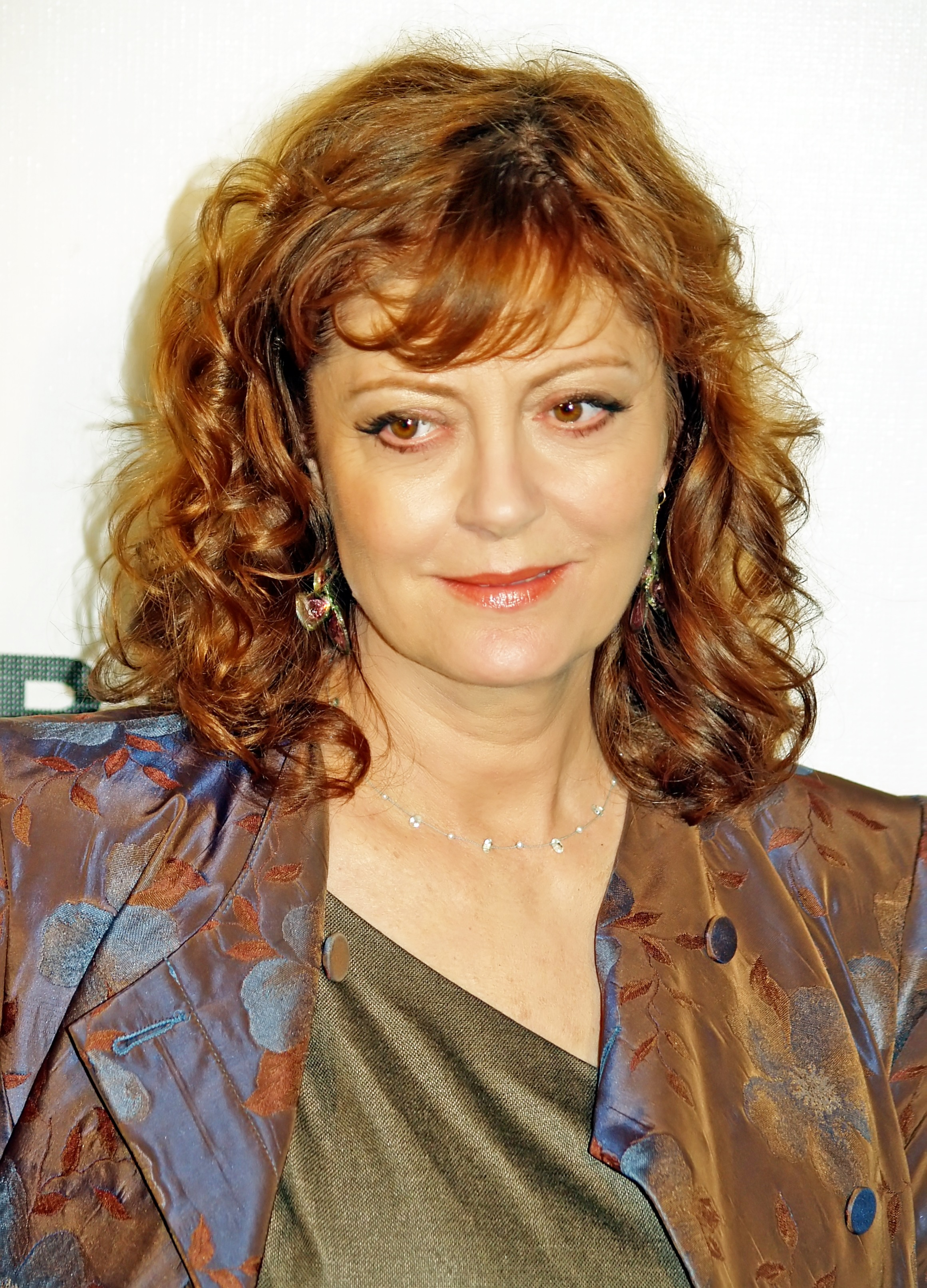
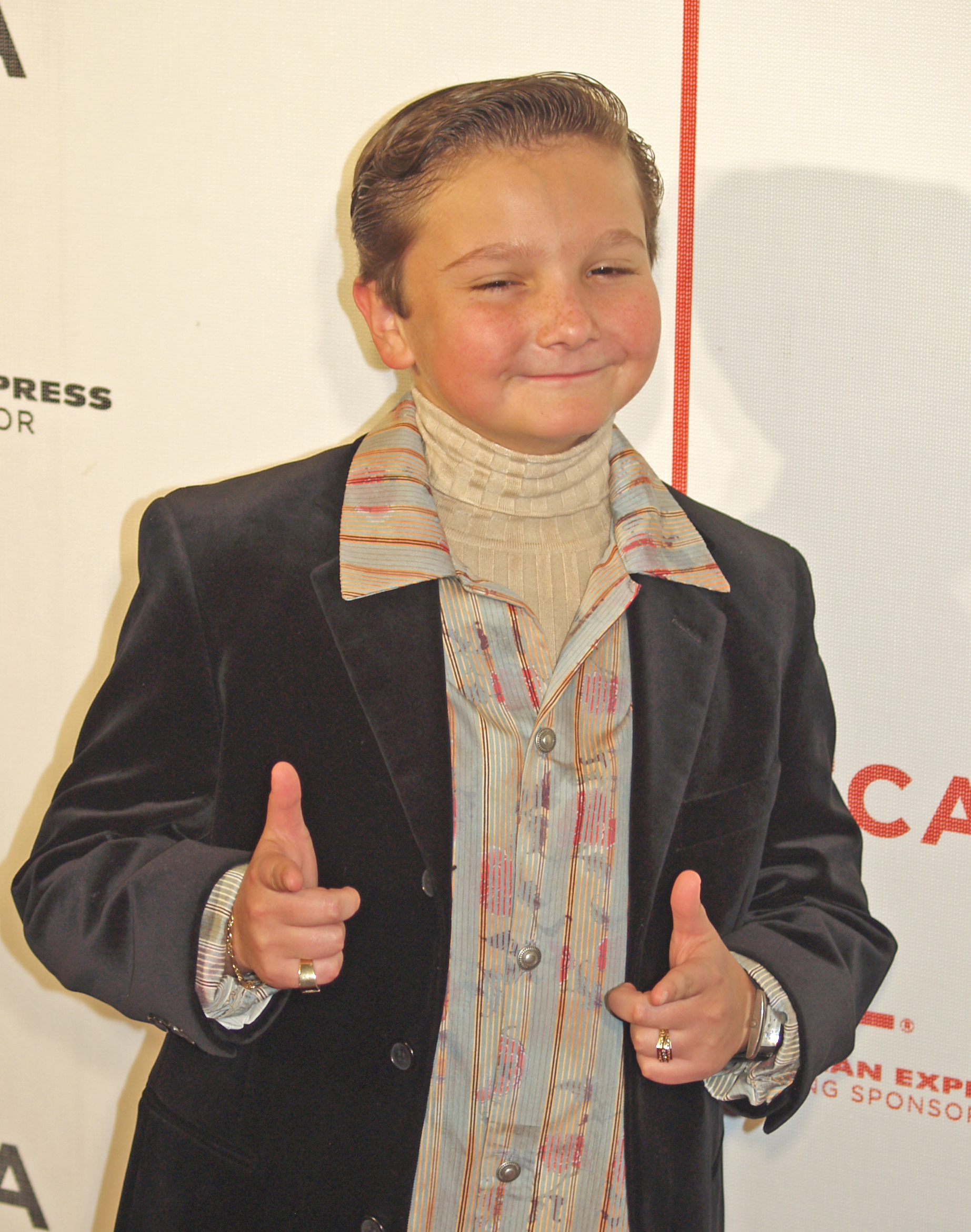
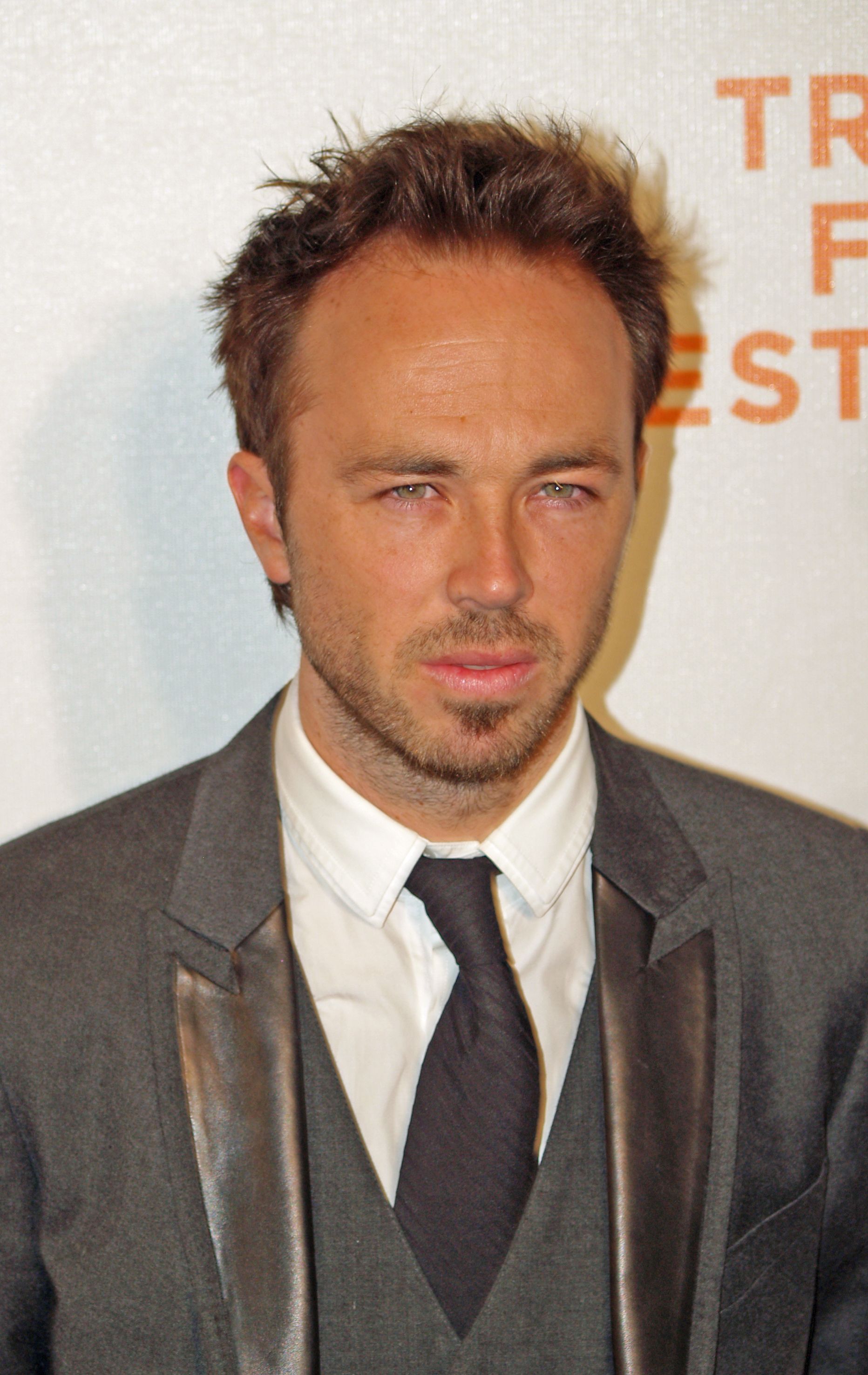
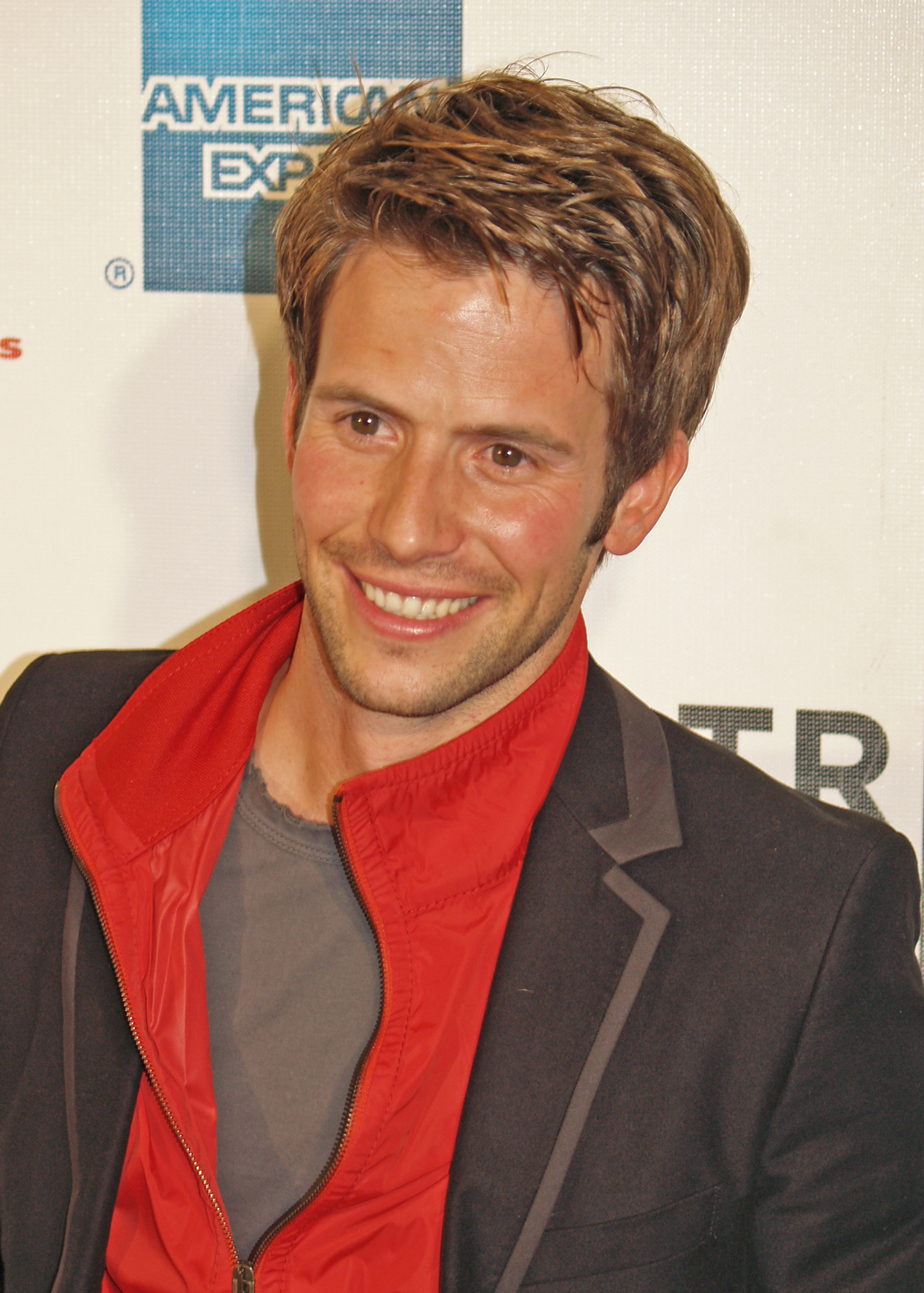
John Goodman, Susan Sarandon, Paulie Litt, Kick Gurry and Christian Oliver at the premiere of the film at the 2008 Tribeca Film Festival.

While Joseph Gordon-Levitt, Shia LaBeouf, and Zac Efron were originally considered for the role of Speed Racer, Emile Hirsch eventually won the role. When he prepared for the role, Hirsch watched every Speed Racer episode and visited Charlotte Motor Speedway (known as Lowe's Motor Speedway at the time), where he met with driver Jimmie Johnson. Before Christina Ricci was cast as Trixie, Elisha Cuthbert, Kate Mara and Rose McGowan were originally considered for the role. Before Matthew Fox was cast as Racer X, Keanu Reeves was offered the role, but he declined. On April 2, 2007, it was announced that both John Goodman and Susan Sarandon were in final negotiations on playing the roles of Pops and Mom Racer respectively, which was later confirmed. On July 2, 2007, it was announced that Richard Roundtree had joined the cast, playing Ben Burns, a race commentator.

=== Filming ===
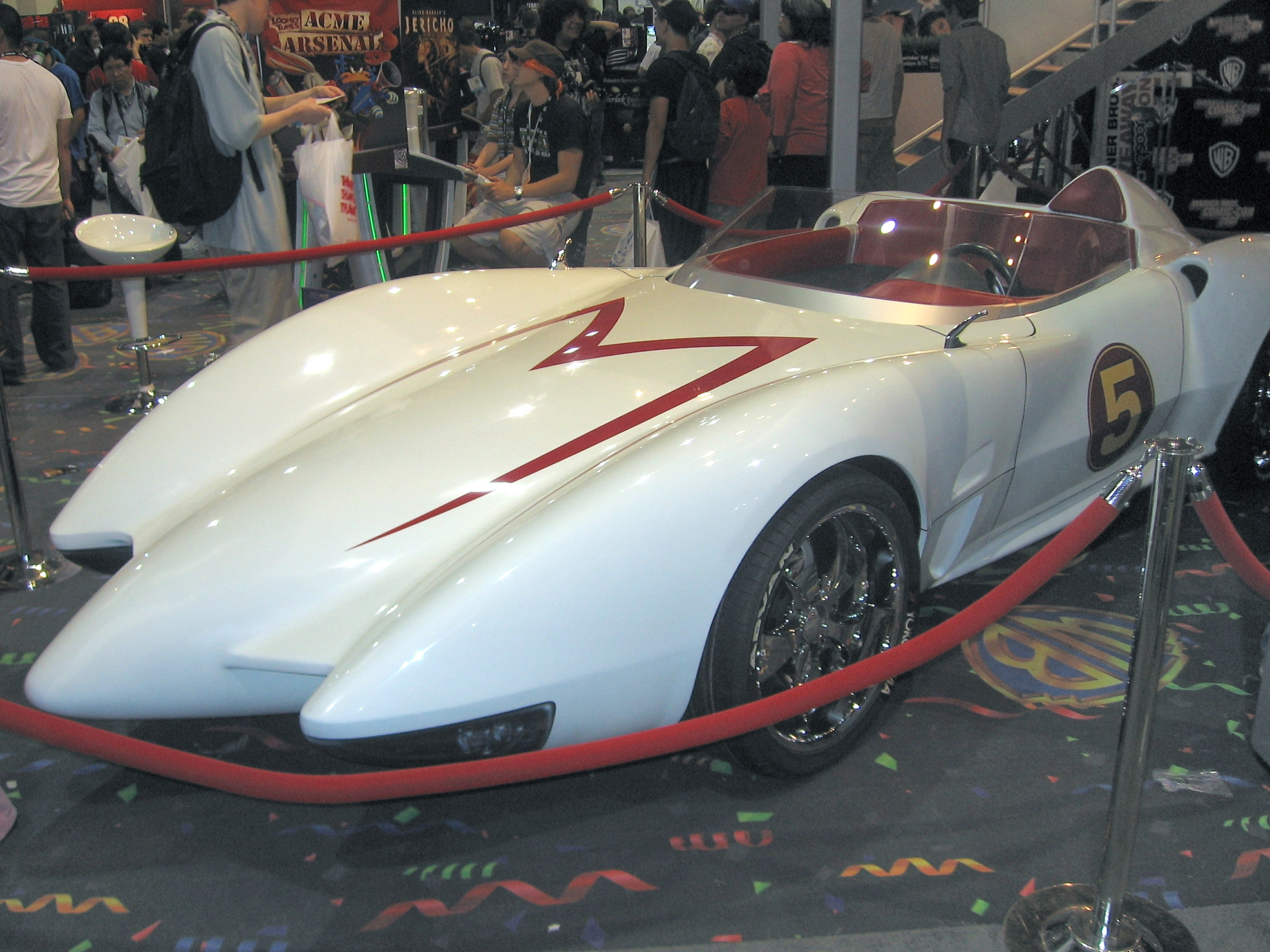
The Mach Five (shown on display at the 2007 Comic-Con International), although a fully-functioning automobile, was hung from a crane for the film's sequences and had its motoring effects computer-generated.

In February 2007, the Wachowskis selected Babelsberg Studios in Potsdam, Germany, to film. In the following March, Warner Bros. moved the release date two weeks earlier to May 9, 2008. The studio received a grant of $12.3 million from Germany's new Federal Film Fund, the largest yet from the organization, for its production in the Berlin-Brandenburg region. The amount was later increased to $13 million. Principal photography commenced on June 5, 2007, in Berlin, and was shot entirely against greenscreen, lasting 60 days. The Wachowskis filmed in high-definition video for the first time. With the camera, the Wachowskis used a layering approach that would put both the foreground and the background in focus to give it the appearance of real-life anime. A week was spent on stage shooting comparison tests with a 35mm camera and a variety of digital cameras to determine what the film would be shot on, settling with the prototype of the recently unveiled Sony CineAlta F23. It was chosen because the crew wanted the film to have "a smooth, grain-free 'Techno Color' palette, a kind of exaggerated digital version of Technicolor...", according to cinematographer David Tattersall, as well the camera's ability to capture more depth of field than a 35mm film. The film has a "retro future" look, according to Silver. Filming concluded on August 25, 2007.

Some of the mid-century homes were filmed in the Vista Las Palmas neighborhood in Palm Springs, California. The footage was enhanced to give it a snow-covered appearance.

=== Visual effects and animation ===
The visual effects and animation for the film were primarily provided by Digital Domain, whose team was led by visual effects supervisors Kim Libreri and Mohen Leo. The studio worked on animating the cars, race tracks, and environments for the film, with them also being involved in two major sequences: the Thunderhead race, and the Grand Prix sequence that defines Speed Racer's career. Digital Domain also worked on the creation of on-set systems which allowed the actors to drive in motion bases so that they would feel like they were in real cars. Computer-generated cars and environments were placed around them in post.

Sony Pictures Imageworks (led by senior visual effects supervisor Kevin Mack) and Industrial Light & Magic (ILM; led by visual effects supervisors John Gaeta and Dan Glass) also contributed to producing the visual effects and animation for the film. Sony Pictures Imageworks animated the Desert Flats, Mountain Rally, and Mountain Switchback race sequences, which required Marco Marenghi and his animation team to add a "sense of weight and realistic speed to all the elaborate cars and their exotic drivers", while Patrick Witting added complex fluid-dust simulations, and Theo Vandernoot did rigid-body simulations of debris and dirt, which "further enhanced the realistic motion of the sequence." ILM's eight-member team, initially led by Libreri and Leo before switching to Digital Domain, did initial four-minute visual effects tests, which was used to further help define the racing look of the film.

=== Music ===
In 2007, the Wachowskis purchased the rights to the sound effects and theme song of the television series for use in the film. The film's soundtrack was composed by Michael Giacchino, performed by Hollywood Studio Symphony and released by Varèse Sarabande. It was used along with orchestral score; Warner Bros. added an updated version of the "Go Speed Racer Go" theme song, which plays during the end credits, and was produced by Ali Dee Theodore and Jason Gleed, and performed by Ali Dee and the Deekompressors. Razor & Tie released this version as an extended play on January 1, 2008, to promote the film's release, and as a single released along with film's soundtrack on May 6, 2008.

=== Animal cruelty incident ===
During its production, animal rights group People for the Ethical Treatment of Animals (PETA) made allegations of animal cruelty against the film, reporting that one of the two chimpanzees used in the production was allegedly beaten after biting a child actor. The incident was confirmed by the American Humane Association (AHA) Animal Safety Representative on the set, who reported that the stand-in for the Spritle character portrayed by Litt had been bitten without provocation. The AHA representative also reported that "toward the end of filming, during a training session in the presence of the American Humane Representative, the trainer, in an uncontrolled impulse, hit the chimpanzee." The AHA Film Unit referred to this abuse as "completely inexcusable and unacceptable behavior in the use of any animal". The AHA placed Speed Racer on their "Unacceptable" list chiefly because of this incident and a separate case where five piranhas died of unexplained causes, with AHA noting "the aforementioned training incident tarnishes the excellent work of the rest of production" and that it "has no method of separating the actions of one individual in the employ of a production from the production as a whole".

== Release ==
=== Marketing ===
The Los Angeles Times estimated that nearly 5,000 Speed Racer film-related products were licensed by Warner Bros. The film was backed by multiple promotional partners with over $80 million in marketing support. The partners include General Mills, McDonald's, Target, Topps, Esurance, Mattel, Lego and Petrobras. The film also received support from companies outside of America in an attempt to attract international audiences. With early support before the film's release, the studio provided 3D computer models of the Speed Racer vehicle Mach 5 to the companies so they could accurately render the vehicle in their merchandise.

Mattel produced toys based on the film through several divisions. Hot Wheels produced die-cast vehicles, race sets, and track sets. Tyco produced remote-controlled Mach 5s and racing sets. Radica Games produced video games in which players can use a car wheel, along with a cross-promotion with the video game U.B. Funkeys. The products became available in March 2008. Also, the Lego Company produced four Lego sets based on the movie. As part of the General Mills promotional tie-in, during the 2008 Crown Royal Presents the Dan Lowry 400, part of the 2008 NASCAR Sprint Cup season, the famous #43 Dodge Charger of Petty Enterprises was transformed into a NASCAR Sprint Cup Series version of the Mach 5, driven by Bobby Labonte.

Warner Bros., through its Interactive Entertainment division, self-published a video game based on the film titled Speed Racer: The Videogame, which was released on May 6, 2008, on the Nintendo DS and Wii and on September 16, 2008, for the PlayStation 2. The original music for the Speed Racer video game was written by Winifred Phillips and produced by Winnie Waldron. The game was released on the Nintendo DS and Wii in May with the film's theatrical release and was released on the PS2 in the fall to accompany the film's DVD and Blu-ray release. Due to a short development schedule, the studio chose not to develop games for the PlayStation 3 and Xbox 360.

=== Home media ===
Warner Home Video released Speed Racer on DVD and Blu-ray on September 16, 2008. The three-disc set features the main feature and supplemental features on the first disc, the DVD game "Speed Racer Crucible Challenge" on the second disc, and a digital copy of the film on the third disc—the last two being exclusive to the Blu-ray release. The U.S. DVD sales reached $6,268,301 and 390,191 copies in the first week, with consumer spending of $14,277,546 and 900,361 copies sold by 2013, and $23 million grossed as of 2018. The Blu-ray version was re-released on May 18, 2010. A new 4K Ultra HD Blu-ray remaster of the film was released on May 19, 2026.

== Reception ==
=== Box office ===
Speed Racer's world premiere took place on April 26, 2008, during a Nokia Theater Special Screening event in Los Angeles, where 4,000 people attended. It was released in regular theaters on May 9, 2008, grossing $18.6 million in its opening weekend from around 6,700 screens at 3,606 theaters in the United States and Canada, ranking third at the box office behind Iron Man and What Happens in Vegas. In its second weekend, it grossed $8.1 million and ranking fourth.

The film ended its run on August 1, 2008, with $43.9 million domestically and $50 million in other territories for a worldwide total of $94 million. Based on its total gross, it was considered a box office failure. The results were well below studio expectations, given that production costs were estimated to be at least $120 million. Despite the low numbers, Warner Bros. remained optimistic about sales of associated products ranging from toys to tennis shoes. Brad Globe, president of Warner Bros. Consumer Products, expressed hope that "We're still going to do very well with Speed Racer", acknowledging that "a giant movie would have made it all a lot bigger".

=== Critical response ===
On the review aggregator website Rotten Tomatoes, 43% of 223 critics' reviews are positive, with an average rating of 5.5/10. The website's consensus reads: "Overloaded with headache-inducing special effects, Speed Racer finds the Wachowskis focused on visual thrills at the expense of a coherent storyline." Metacritic, which uses a weighted average, assigned the film a score of 37 out of 100, based on 37 critics, indicating "generally unfavorable" reviews. Audiences polled by CinemaScore gave the film an average grade of "A−" on an A+ to F scale.

Writing for The Hollywood Reporter, Kirk Honeycutt called Speed Racer's visual effects "stellar", but stated it "proudly denies entry into its ultra-bright world to all but gamers, fanboys and anime enthusiasts". He criticized that the story and character were "tossed aside" towards the "wearying" races. Todd McCarthy of Variety noted the target audience should be amused, but others might think the film "a cinematic pile-up", citing its implausibility and the lack of identifiable peril in the driving sequences. While noting viewers interested in CGI would appreciate it, McCarthy said the frame sometimes resembled "a kindergartner's art class collage". He had praise for the cinematography, the musical score, and the cast. Anime News Network's Zac Bertschy also praised the cast, while saying the story is "as anyone would expect", adding "the characters are all cardboard archetypes with Saturday Morning dialogue." Speed Racer "sets out to honor and refresh a youthful enthusiasm from the past and winds up smothering the fun in self-conscious grandiosity", declared The New York Times's A. O. Scott.

Glenn Kenny of Premiere criticized the film's time-shifting narrative and multiple storylines, saying it "yields heretofore undreamed of levels of narrative incoherence". Kenny praised the film's look, saying the "cheez-whizziness" that others had criticised was "precisely the point". He remarked the movie inspires even more thinking than The Matrix because of its "blatantly anti-capitalist storylines". Similarly, The New Yorker's Anthony Lane said the film could still end up "bleached of fun" due to the theme mooted in The Matrix that all of us are being controlled. In Speed Racer, Lane argues, this comes in the form of villain Royalton, who "vows to crush [Speed] with 'the unassailable might of money.'" He concluded some people may call it entertaining, but he "felt [it] like Pop fascism". Jim Emerson, editor at the Chicago Sun-Times, wrote that Speed Racer "is a manufactured widget, a packaged commodity that capitalizes on an anthropomorphized cartoon of Capitalist Evil in order to sell itself and its ancillary products". It was said to be "the most tiresome piece of CGI (Computer Generated Idiocy [sic])" of the "past couple of years" at the time of film's release by Philip French, a The Guardian critic.

IGN's Todd Gilchrist gave a positive review, stating that Speed Racer "is not merely the best film that it could be, it's pretty much exactly what it should be: full of exciting, brilliantly-conceived races, primary-color characterizations and an irresistible sense of fun". He called Speed Racer "a masterpiece of its kind", praising "the special effects extravaganza" and "the moment when the Wachowskis went from wunderkind directors to true auteurs". Michael Phillips of the Chicago Tribune described Speed Racer as "buoyant pop entertainment and noted the Wachowskis respected "the themes of honor, dishonor, family loyalty and Visigoth-inspired barbarism behind the wheel" of the original work. The cast is praised as being "earnest" and "gently playful". However, he stated that "it sags in its midsection" with unnecessary dialogue. Although it was said to be among the worst films of the year by Rebecca Murray of About.com, she included Speed Racer on her list of "Top 10 Action Movies of 2008", stating "the action sequences are definitely eye-catching". Time magazine included Speed Racer on its list of "The All-Time 25 Best Sports Movies" and "Top 10 Movies of 2008". It said "Not every avant-garde FX masterpiece receives instant audience validation", described the film as "a rich, cartoonish dream: non-stop Op art, and a triumph of virtual virtuosity."

Roger Allam's portrayal of Arnold Royalton was praised; Variety said he made "a delicious love-to-hate-him villain". Time magazine critic Richard Corliss claimed that Allam was "channeling Brit pundit Christopher Hitchens as his most pompestuous"; similar comparisons were made by several other reviewers.

=== Retrospective reappraisal ===
About the movie's reception, Christina Ricci said: "I think I was aware of the disconnect that was going on at the time, and I was sort of watching and... Not that I expected that, but I knew that there would be problems, because I knew that people were expecting something very different than what was actually going to be delivered."

The film has appeared periodically on lists of underrated films. Speed Racer was elected the third most underrated film of the 2000s by Den of Geek's N.P. Horton, which called it "a game-changing film which redefined and reconceptualised the film form as we know it". Nick Hyman, writing for Metacritic, included the film on its list of "movies that critics got wrong" calling it "a cult classic in the making". It was described as "nearly unmatched [...] insofar as action/adventure/family films go" by Alejandro Stepenberg from JoBlo.com, while Slate's Chris Wade named it "an underrated masterpiece", stating that the Wachowskis "made a brilliant visual cartoon that dares to ask that you take it seriously". Scott Tobias, who gave Speed Racer a mixed review in The A.V. Club upon its release, calling its visual effects "visionary" despite saying the film was "much of the time unwatchable", reassessed the film more positively in a 2021 article for The Reveal, stating:

"But that's the thing about cutting-edge work: Not everyone is ready for the future, even if they suspect they're seeing it. Over time, Speed Racer has no longer seemed like a "big, indigestible lump" because my metabolism for processing images has changed, and its hummingbird flutter of montages, superimpositions, and visual effects is more legible."

Annalee Newitz of io9 analyzed the ten reasons why they believe the film to be an "unsung masterpiece", including its visuals, humor, and political themes. Tor.com's Dexter Palmer considered the possibility that the film is a "misunderstood art film", highlighting its color scheme that is a "pleasure" and the fact it does not try to seem real. Palmer lauded it because he does not think films must imitate reality, and ultimately said it is "an extreme reminder of what films, and especially fantasy and science fiction films, can place on screen" and that it is "a refreshing change of pace" in the film industry. Collider's Kayti Burt ranked it at No. 30 of Best Hollywood Blockbusters of the 21st Century stating, "While other blockbusters of the year (and the decade) worked to ground their fantastical premises in a gritty, realistic setting, Speed Racer leaned hard in the other direction."

=== Accolades ===
Speed Racer was nominated at the Golden Trailer Awards for "Summer 2008 Blockbuster", at the MTV Movie Award for "Best Summer Movie So Far", at the Motion Picture Sound Editors Golden Reel Award for "Best Sound Editing: Sound Effects and Foley in a Feature Film", at the Visual Effects Society Awards for "Outstanding Matte Paintings in a Feature Motion Picture". At the 2008 Teen Choice Awards, Speed Racer was a nominee in the category of "Movie: Action Adventure", "Movie Actor: Action Adventure" and "Movie Actress: Action Adventure". The film was also nominated for the 29th Golden Raspberry Awards in the category of Worst Prequel, Remake, Rip-off or Sequel.

== Possible sequel ==
Before the film's release, Variety discussed a possible sequel, saying it could happen if Speed Racer had a good box office performance. In 2008, Rain said that when he asked the Wachowskis why his character is so happy for Speed winning, they replied it could be explained in the next film. Rain said he was hired on a three-year contract, but noted that did not guarantee another film. Ricci also considered it a possibility; she stated "When we [the cast] were all leaving, we were like 'write the sequel!' 'We want to come back'. And they [the Wachowskis] were like, 'I know. I know. We're going to. Don't worry'", adding she would like more action scenes for her character. Joel Silver said that the Wachowskis "have a great story idea for a sequel" but that it is "a great idea for a sequel if it makes sense to make it". In 2018, Hirsch stated in a tweet that a sequel script has been written.
