= 20Q =

Computerized guessing game

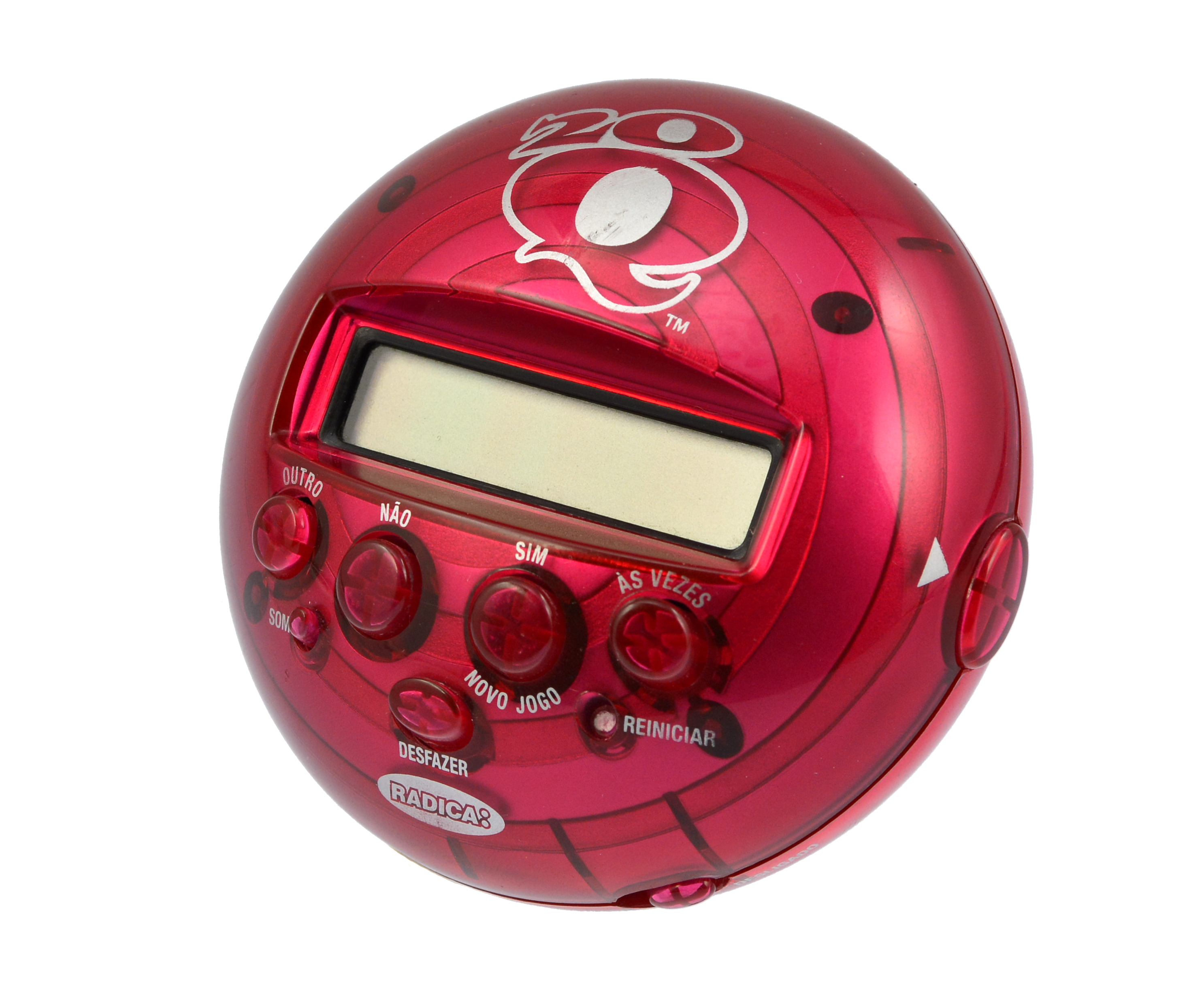
- A red 20Q by Radica
- Type: Electronic game Online game iOS iPad App customized knowledgebases
- Invented by: Robin Burgener
- Company: Radica (2003 - 2011); Techno Source (2011-2015); Uncle Milton Industries (2015–2017); Irwin Toys (2017-2019); Hansen Toys (2020-present)
- Country: United States
- Availability: 1988–present
- Materials: Artificial Intelligence
- Official website

20Q is a computerized game of twenty questions that began as a test in artificial intelligence (AI). It was invented by Robin Burgener in 1988. The game was made handheld by Radica in 2003, but was discontinued in 2011 because Techno Source took the license for 20Q handheld devices.

The game 20Q is based on the spoken parlor game known as twenty questions, and is both a website and a handheld device. 20Q asks the player to think of something and will then try to guess what they are thinking of with twenty yes-or-no questions. If it fails to guess in 20 questions, it will ask an additional 5 questions. If it fails to guess even with 25 (or 30) questions, the player is declared the winner. Sometimes the first guess of the object can be asked at question 14.

== Principle and history ==
The principle is that the player thinks of something and the 20Q artificial intelligence asks a series of questions before guessing what the player is thinking. This artificial intelligence learns on its own with the information relayed back to the players who interact with it, and is not programmed. The player can answer these questions with: Yes, No, Unknown, and Sometimes. The experiment is based on the classic word game of Twenty Questions, and on the computer game "Animals," popular in the early 1970s, which used a somewhat simpler method to guess an animal.

The 20Q AI uses an artificial neural network to pick the questions and to guess. After the player has answered the twenty questions posed (sometimes fewer), 20Q makes a guess. If it is incorrect, it asks more questions, then guesses again. It makes guesses based on what it has learned; it is not programmed with information or what the inventor thinks. Answers to any question are based on players’ interpretations of the questions asked. Newer editions were made for different categories, such as music 20Q which has the player think of a song, and Harry Potter 20Q, which has the player think of something from the world of the Harry Potter series.

The 20Q AI can draw its own conclusions on how to interpret the information. It can be described as more of a folk taxonomy than a taxonomy. Its knowledge develops with every game played. In this regard, the online version of the 20Q AI can be inaccurate because it gathers its answers from what people think rather than from what people know. Limitations of taxonomy are often overcome by the AI itself because it can learn and adapt. For example, if the player was thinking of a "Horse" and answered "No" to the question "Is it an animal?," the AI will, nevertheless, guess correctly, despite being told that a horse is not an animal.

Patent applications in the US and Europe were submitted in 2005.

A PlayStation mini version of the game developed by I-Play was released in Europe for the PlayStation Portable on 20 April 2011.

In August 2014, 20Q.net Inc., with Brashworks Studios, developed and released an iOS iPad version available at the Apple iTunes store.

== Game show ==
On June 13, 2009, GSN began a TV version of the game, hosted by Cat Deeley, with Hal Sparks as the voice of Mr. Q.

== See also ==
- Akinator
- Twenty questions
