= Fijit Friends =

Toy line by Mattel

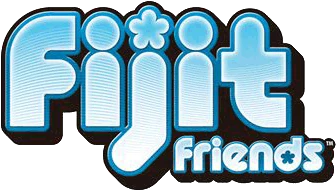
- Company: Mattel; Radica Games; Girl Tech
- Country: United States
- Availability: 2011–2013
- Official website

Fijit Friends are a robot toy line directed toward girls created by Mattel, Radica Games and Girl Tech. They made their debut in July 2011 at the New York Toy Fair and are similar to the famous toy Furby. Their names are Logan, Serafina, Willa and Sage. As of 2016, it seems as if the line has been discontinued, as no new products have been released since 2013. The former web address redirects to Mattel's Customer service website.

Additional releases in the line are Fijit Newbies, Fijit Yippits, and Shimmies.

== Awards ==
In 2012, the Fijit Friends Interactive Figures was awarded "Girl Toy of the Year" title at the 12th Annual Toy of the Year Awards, which is held at the American International Toy Fair in New York City.
