= U.B. Funkeys =

Toy line by Mattel

- Developer: Arkadium (game software)
- Type: Toys-to-life computer game and collectible figure line
- Launched: August 2007
- Discontinued: January 2011 (online services)
- Platform: PC
- Operating systems: Windows XP and Windows Vista
- Status: Online service defunct; offline game remains playable
- Pricing model: Starter-kit purchase; no subscription
- Website: ubfunkeys.com (archived July 22, 2009)

U.B. Funkeys is a toys-to-life computer game and collectible figure line released by Mattel in 2007. The physical toys were designed by Radica Games, while the accompanying game software was developed by Arkadium.

The game combines collectible vinyl figures with a Windows computer game. Players connect a large USB accessory called the Hub and place smaller Funkey figures on it. The attached figure determines the player's on-screen character and grants access to corresponding locations, shops and minigames.

The original product line was sold from 2007 until 2010. Mattel ended support for the game's online services in January 2011, although much of the offline game remained usable.

== Development and release ==
Mattel presented U.B. Funkeys at the 2007 American International Toy Fair as part of a range of computer-connected toys. The product was marketed toward children aged eight and older and was intended to combine vinyl figure collecting with computer gaming.

At launch, the starter kit included the Windows game software, a USB Hub and two Funkey figures. Mattel initially priced the starter kit at US$19.99 and individual figures at US$4.99.

Mattel described the launch collection as containing more than 40 characters. A contemporary Kidzworld review described the initial selection as 42 figures, consisting of 14 character types produced in three color variations.

== Hardware ==
The Hub is a larger white figure that connects to a computer through USB. Smaller Funkey figures attach to the Hub using magnets, while contact points on the bottom of each figure allow the software to identify it. Replacing the physical figure changes the player's on-screen avatar without requiring the game to be restarted.

The Hub does not function as a conventional game controller. Movement and menu interaction are performed using the computer's mouse and keyboard, while the figures act as physical access keys for characters and game content.

== Gameplay ==
U.B. Funkeys takes place in Terrapinia, a virtual world inhabited by the Funkeys. The player begins in Funkeystown, which acts as the central area connecting the game's different zones. Each type of Funkey is associated with particular locations and game rooms. Placing a compatible figure on the Hub allows the player to enter those areas.

The game's story concerns Master Lox and his Henchmen, who have restricted travel through Terrapinia and attempt to steal the player's coins. Progress involves opening zones, completing games and collecting items connected to each area.

=== Minigames and coins ===
Each Funkey provides access to at least one themed game room. The minigames use a variety of formats, including racing, tile matching, rhythm games, puzzles and action games. Completing them rewards the player with coins.

Coins can be spent in shops throughout Terrapinia. Purchasable items include furniture and decorations for the player's virtual home, referred to in the game as a "crib". Some games also award trophies and other collectible items after the player reaches particular goals.

=== Cribs ===
Each player has a crib that can be decorated with purchased furniture, wallpaper and other items. During operation of the original online service, players could upload and share their crib with other users.

The crib also served as a personal menu and collection area. Mattel continued to identify crib decoration as an offline feature after support for the online services ended.

=== Online features ===
Later versions of the game added online communication and multiplayer systems. Certain figures opened chat rooms, while others provided access to competitive multiplayer games. The game also supported online profile saving, software updates and crib sharing.

The game did not require a recurring subscription. Online features were instead accessed through the software and compatible figures.

== Figures and sets ==
Funkey figures were sold individually and in several multipack formats. Mattel released starter kits, twin packs, quad packs, specialty packs, adventure packs, chat packs and multiplayer sets.

Many character designs were produced in multiple color variations with different levels of availability. Mattel also sold retailer-exclusive collections, including a Target-exclusive specialty pack containing four figures marketed as "Very Rare".

=== Starter kits ===
Starter kits generally contained a Hub, installation software and a selection of figures. Later starter kits used Hub designs corresponding to newer areas of the game. Mattel released standard, limited-edition, pink, multiplayer, Dream State, Hidden Realm, Funkiki Island and Speed Racer starter kits.

=== Adventure and specialty packs ===
Adventure packs contained groups of characters associated with a particular part of Terrapinia. The Funkeystown Adventure Pack, released in 2008, contained Mayor Sayso, Master Lox, a Henchman and Bones. Each figure unlocked a game and additional crib items.

Specialty packs bundled several figures and were sometimes exclusive to particular retailers. Other packages grouped figures connected to chat rooms or multiplayer games.

== Expansions ==
Mattel expanded the game with additional figures, zones and software updates. Major themed releases included Funkiki Island, Dream State, Hidden Realm, Paradox Green and a licensed collection based on the 2008 film Speed Racer.

=== Dream State ===
The Dream State expansion introduced the Daydream Oasis and Nightmare Rift zones. Mattel advertised 30 new collectible figures for the expansion, along with quests, chat features and multiplayer games.

Dream State figures were distributed through starter kits, quad packs, chat packs and individual releases. Different figures opened games and items associated with either Daydream Oasis or Nightmare Rift.

=== Speed Racer ===
The Speed Racer collection replaced the standard Hub design with one based on the film and included figures representing its characters. Mattel released multiple Speed Racer starter kits and individual figures, including Speed Racer, Racer X, Trixie, Chim Chim and other characters from the film.

=== Later releases ===
The later Hidden Realm and Paradox Green releases added further figures and locations. Mattel's final downloadable software, version 4.8, included character support through Hidden Realm. According to Mattel, content from Paradox Green was no longer available for download after the online service was discontinued.

== System requirements ==
Mattel listed Windows XP and Windows Vista as the supported operating systems. The published minimum requirements included an 800 MHz processor, 512 MB of memory, 1 GB of storage, a USB port, a CD or DVD drive and Adobe Flash Player 9.

A broadband connection was recommended for online functionality. Mattel stated that the original software was not compatible with Windows 7, Windows 8 or macOS. A separate version 4.8 download was provided for 64-bit Windows systems, although that download was later removed.

== Reception ==
Kidzworld highlighted the number of characters, variety of locations and selection of minigames. The review criticized the requirement to purchase additional figures to unlock more areas, noting that collecting them could become expensive. It also criticized the initial version's limited interaction with other players.

MMORPG.com described the game as a collectible-toy game with lightweight online elements. The review noted the absence of subscription fees, the ease of switching figures and the way the toys connected with their on-screen counterparts. It gave the game a score of 7 out of 10.

U.B. Funkeys was nominated for Electronic Entertainment Toy of the Year at the 2008 Toy of the Year Awards. The category was won by Hasbro's Power Tour Electric Guitar.

== Discontinuation ==
Mattel lists products in the U.B. Funkeys line as discontinued in 2010.

In January 2011, Mattel ended official support for the game's online services. The discontinued functions included software updates, online profile saving, the Funkey Trunk, chat figures and rooms, multiplayer games, crib sharing and the official website.

Mattel stated that the offline portions of the software would continue to function. These included character rooms, minigames, shops and local crib customization. However, content that depended on downloads or server communication could no longer be obtained through the original service.
