= Techno Source =

- Type: Privately held company
- Industry: Toys and games
- Founded: 2000
- Headquarters: Hong Kong (HQ); New York City, New York (U.S.)
- Key people: Wayne Nathan, Co-Founder; Rich Migatz, Co-Founder; Eric Levin, Executive Vice President
- Products: Handheld electronic games and TV Games
- Website: www.technosourceusa.com

Techno Source is a handheld electronic game and TV game company selling electronic toys, games and learning aids. Based in Hong Kong with an office in New York City, it is a privately owned company founded in 2000 by Wayne Nathan and Rich Migatz. In April 2011, Techno Source was acquired by Li & Fung.

== Products ==
20Q was invented in 1988 as an experiment for artificial intelligence. In 2004, Radica made the game handheld. In 2011, an improved version by Techno Source was introduced, featuring more answers and better interaction.

The company worked in the retro gaming market, creating TV game systems that plugged directly into a television set. After entering into a licensing agreement with Intellivision in 2003, Techno Source introduced the Intellivision 25, which featured 25 original Intellivision games in one plug-and-play unit. Following the release of the Intellivision 25 and its follow-up, the Intellivision 10, Techno Source claimed that they had sold over 1,000,000 units and received the National Parenting Center's "Seal of Approval" in 2004.

This line later included the 2-player Intellivision X2 and the Intellivision 10 2nd Edition. According to the Blue Sky Rangers, the original programmers of the Intellivision games, Techno Source sold more Intellivision games than Mattel Electronics originally sold in the 1980s.

In 2003, Techno Source and Crayola released electronic handheld games and plug-and-play units for pre-school users. Two of their TV Game units, My First TV Play System and My First Electronic Coloring Book, received the National Parenting Center's "Seal of Approval" in 2004 & 2005, and the Dr. Toy Smart "Play Smart" Toy Award in 2005. They were also featured as part of MarketWatch's coverage of the Licensing Show in 2004.

In 2005, the company and Coleco reintroduce their "Head-to-Head" handheld electronic games, which lets two players play against each other in football, basketball, baseball, and soccer simultaneously. Dr. Toy named Techno Source to its list of the 10 Best High-Tech Children's Products as well as one of the 100 Best Products for this assortment in 2005.

They also agreed a licensing partnership with Sesame Street in 2005, producing a series of handheld electronic games and TV games designed to entertainment and promote learning. Several of these products won multiple awards, such as the Dr. Toy Smart Toy Award and the Parent to Parent Adding Wisdom Award in 2006.

The company's handheld Touch Screen Sudoku, which was nominated for Game of the Year by the Toy Industry Association in 2006. A version with embedded Swarovski crystals was given out at the 12th Annual Screen Actors Guild Awards.

On 9 February 2006 the company announced a worldwide licensing agreement with Activision, Inc. (Nasdaq:ATVI) to develop and distribute products based on Activision properties from the 1980s including Pitfall 2, River Raid, Chopper Command, Barnstorming and Kaboom. The deal included TV plug and play Systems and LCD-based handheld games, which were available at retail in September 2006.

On 19 June 2006 the company and Rubik's announced a line of electronic games based on the original Rubik's Cube.
