= Cube World (toy) =

Handheld electronic game series

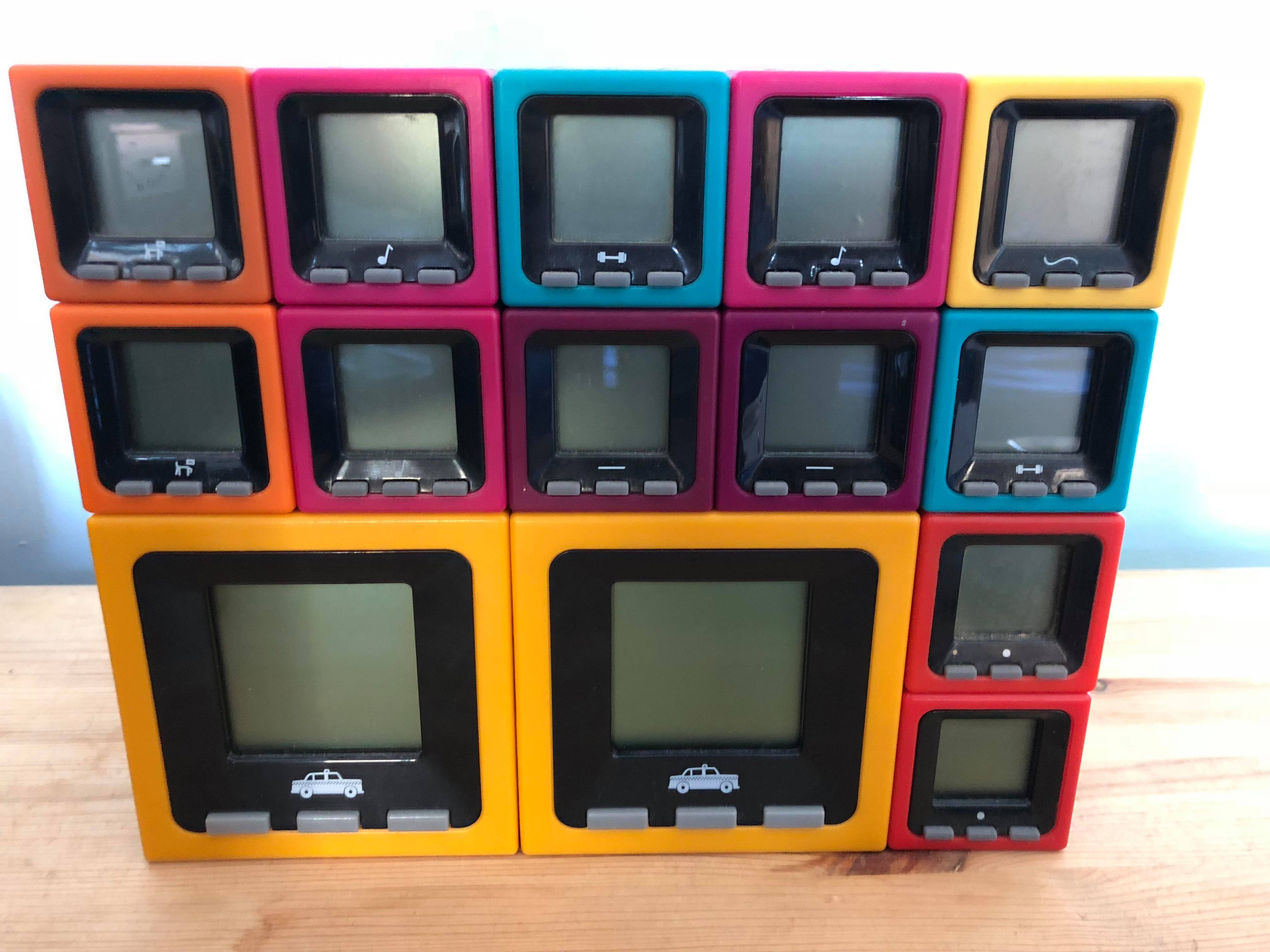
- A collection of Cube World units
- Type: Electronic game
- Invented by: Tony Ellis & Judie Ellis
- Company: Radica Games, Mattel
- Country: United States
- Availability: 2005–2009
- Slogan: Stick people sticking together
- Official website

Cube World is a series of handheld electronic toys developed by Radica Games and Mattel between 2005 and 2009. Each Cube World cube contains an animated stick figure who is able to interact with the figures in other cubes when connected together.

== Description ==
Cube World cubes can be assembled together by magnets on top of one another or side by side. Each cube contains a stick figure that has a unique animation it performs by itself and with others, such as playing a musical instrument or lifting weights. When the cubes are combined, the figures interact with one another, and can move from cube to cube, with up to four at a time in any display across a maximum network of sixteen cubes. The cubes also contain a built-in gyroscope, animating the figures when the cube is tilted upside down. Each cube also contain unique games played with the buttons, and feature over 100 animations.

== Sets ==
Cube World was released as 22 different models across six series. Some units in each series were released as a 'Special Edition', in which the cubes were encased in translucent plastic, an example of the clear craze. In Japan, Cube World was distributed by Bandai, which contained identical animations but featured variations to the Radica and Mattel color schemes.

Cube World series
Series	Release date	Name	Color	Description
1	2005	Scoop	Orange	Dog lover
1	2005	Slim	Purple	Uses a stick
1	2005	Whip	Yellow	Rope tricks
1	2005	Dodger	Red	Kicks a ball
2	2006	Mic	Pink	Musical
2	2006	Hans	Light blue	Works out
2	2006	Handy	Dark blue	Fixes things
2	2006	Dusty	Light green	Cleans up
3	2006	Chief	Blue	Police Officer
3	2006	Toner	Gray	Corporate desk jockey
3	2006	Dash	Green	Delivers things
3	2006	Sparky	Brown	Fireman
4 (Sports)	2007	Slugger	Light red	Baseball
4 (Sports)	2007	Kicks	Green	Soccer
4 (Sports)	2007	Slam	Orange	Basketball
4 (Sports)	2007	Grinder	Tan	Extreme sports
5 (Mods)	2008	Dart	Purple	Funhouse mirror modifier
5 (Mods)	2008	Hip Hop	Black	Speaker modifier
5 (Mods)	2008	Splash	Blue	Faucet modifier
5 (Mods)	2008	Sci-fi	White	Particle accelerator modifier
Places (Jumbo Cubes)	2007	Block Bash	Yellow-orange	City location
Places (Jumbo Cubes)	2007	Global Getaways	Blue	Vacation location

== History ==
Cube World was initially developed by Conceptioneering Ltd, a company consisting of Crowborough-based inventor and electrical design engineer Tony Ellis and his wife Judie. Ellis was inspired to create the toy based on the design of a block of flats, stating "I started wondering what the people who lived there were up to...we ended up with these cubes with stickmen where you can see what's going on inside these windows." Cube World was initially distributed in 2005 at a retail price of $30 USD for a pair. On October 3, 2006, Mattel acquired Radica Games and incorporated its properties, including Cube World, expanding the brand into a global market.

Cube World was a commercial success, selling several million units according to Ellis, and received positive reviews from consumer publications. Michael Fereday of Gadget Speak praised the game as possessing an "interesting fascination beyond their simple graphics," stating "it is amazing what these characters get up (to) either individually or in various combinations." In 2007, Cube World was nominated as the "Electronic Toy of the Year" by Toy Industry Association at the North American International Toy Fair.
