= Stephen L. Hodge =

Stephen L. Hodge is the CEO and co-founder of OTTera, Inc. a leading white-label video streaming technology and media company, founded in 2017 and headquartered in Los Angeles. CEO and co-founder of Toon Goggles, Inc.,, An on-demand entertainment service for children offering cartoons, live-action programs, games, and music safe for child audiences, available online and through apps for mobile devices and smart TVs. Chief Marketing Director of Digital Media Interactive, and Chairman of AfroLandTv , a free streaming platform for film and television content from the African and Afro-descendant diaspora.

== Biography ==
Stephen L. Hodge was born and raised in Los Angeles. He lives in LA with his three children.
