= Radica Games =

Hong Kong games company, 1983 to 2011

- Industry: Video gaming
- Founded: 1983; 43 years ago
- Defunct: 2011; 15 years ago
- Fate: Absorbed into Mattel in 2010s
- Successor: Mattel
- Headquarters: Hong Kong
- Number of employees: 2500 (1998)
- Parent: Mattel

Radica Games Limited was a Hong Kong company that produced electronic games, founded in 1983. It began by producing electronic souvenir games for casinos. In the late 1990s, it became known for its Bass Fishin line of games. On October 3, 2006, Mattel, Inc. announced the completion of their acquisition of Radica. While Radica produced electronic handheld games based on casino or card games, it has branched out into toys, board games, and video game accessories.

== Products ==
Product lines under Radica, past and present, include:

- Stealth Assault - electronic motion sensor game where player tilts the device to fly a stealth plane shooting down jets
- PlayTV - examples include PlayTV Football, Skateboarding, Baseball and Golf
- PlayTV Legends - formerly known as "Arcade Legends", the line includes plug-n-play systems featuring video games licensed from Sega and Taito, as well as Tetris
- Skannerz
- 20Q - electronic toy version
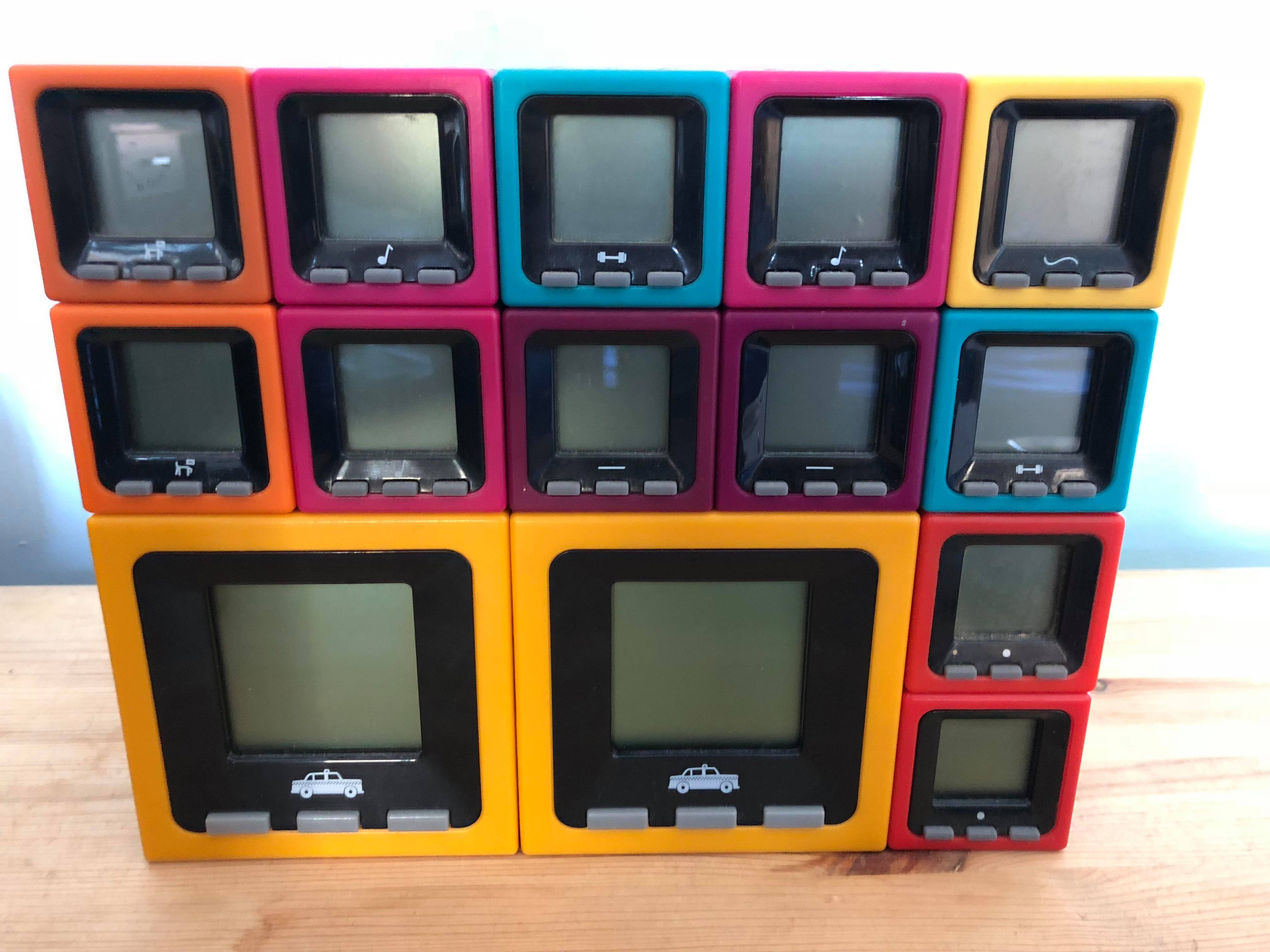
  Cube World
- Cube World - electronic toy featuring stick people as characters on black-and-white LCD screens, 2005 - 2008, each cube has contacts on top, bottom, and sides, 3 push buttons, and an internal motion sensor. Not to be confused with the game of the same name.
  - Series 1 Cube Types: 'Scoop' Orange, 'Slim' Purple, 'Whip' Yellow, 'Dodger' Red
  - Series 2 Cube Types: 'Mic' Pink, 'Hans' Light Blue, 'Handy' Dark Blue, 'Dusty' Light green (as pictured ->)
  - Series 3 Cube Types: 'Chief' Blue, 'Toner' Gray, 'Dash' Green, 'Sparky' Brown.
  - Series 4 Cube Types: 'Slugger' Light Red, 'Kicks' Green, 'Slam' Orange, 'Grinder' Tan
  - Series 5 Cube Types (with mods): 'Dart' Purple, 'Hip Hop' Black, 'Splash' Blue, 'Sci-Fi' White
  - Series Jumbo Cube Types: 'Block Bash' Yellow-Orange, 'Global Getaway' Blue
- U.B. Funkeys - August 26, 2007 - 2010
- Talking Buzz Lightyear
- Loopz
- Nascar Racer - 1998
- I-Combat - a 3D game that is worn over the head
- Big Screen Sudoku game
- Blackjack 21
- Poker-Blackjack Lite
- Solitare
- Color Screen Uno - backlit color Uno card game
- Fijit Friends
- Word Scramble
- Pocket Slot - 1999

== See also ==
- Majesco
- Jakks Pacific
