= Irvin Kipper =

American bomber pilot and businessman

- Born: Irvin Sylvan Kipper; November 13, 1916; Fort Worth, Texas
- Died: April 21, 2016 (aged 99)
- Occupation: Business Owner
- Known for: Kip's Toyland

Irvin Sylvan "Kip" Kipper, (November 13, 1916 – April 21, 2016) was a US Army Air Forces bomber pilot, prisoner of war, and the founder and namesake of Kip's Toyland, the oldest toy store in Los Angeles, located in the Farmer's Market since 1945.

== Early life ==
Irvin Kipper was born in Fort Worth, Texas, on November 13, 1916, and his family moved to Los Angeles in 1920. Kipper graduated from LA's Jefferson High School as Valedictorian. In 1944, he enlisted in the US Army Air Corps, ultimately becoming an officer and pilot of the Boeing B-17 Flying Fortress during World War II. While flying in Europe, Kipper named his B-17 "Purdy Gertie", after his wife, Gertrude.

=== Family ===
Kipper married his wife Gertrude on January 1, 1939. Born in Ohio in 1919, Gertrude and her family moved to Los Angeles in 1929, where she graduated from Los Angeles High School. After they married, Kipper left for war, and it was the only time in their lives that the two were apart. Gertrude was athletic and musically talented and gave tennis and piano lessons.

Kipper and Gertrude had two boys, Don and Robert, as well as four grandchildren, Andrew, Lily, Natalie and Elliot. Son Don and granddaughter Lily are now the current owners of Kip's Toyland. Their other son, Robert, is a divorce attorney in Beverly Hills. At the time of his death, he had been married for 77 years.

Gertrude died only six weeks after Kipper.

== Military service ==
Kipper served with the 463rd Bombardment Group in the US Army Air Forces as a first lieutenant. He served with other units as well, including 15th Air Force and 772nd Bomb Squadron.

On his 26th mission, Kipper was shot down over Bologna, Italy where he was captured and spent more than seven months as a Nazi prisoner of war in the POW camps Stalag Luft III (celebrated in books, TV and film for "The Great Escape") and Stalag VII. Kipper's camp was liberated by troops of George S. Patton in August 1945.

== Career ==
When Kipper returned to Los Angeles after the war, he purchased a small store to sell flags. Part of the reason he chose to open a toy store was because after the trauma he experienced during the war, he wanted to bring joy to those around him. He then added balloons, which were a big hit, because rubber was rationed during the war. Then he added Slinky, board games, Lincoln Logs, Tinkertoy sets, Carrom Game Boards, and new toys as they were invented.

FAO Schwarz opened up a short distance from Kip's Toyland, but they went out of business, while Kip's Toyland is still flourishing, recently celebrating its 75th anniversary in November 2020.
