= Kip's Toyland =

Oldest toy store in Los Angeles, United States

- Company type: Private company
- Industry: Retail
- Founded: 1945; 81 years ago
- Founder: Irvin Kipper
- Headquarters: Los Angeles, United States
- Area served: Los Angeles
- Products: Toy store
- Owner: Don Kipper
- Website: kipstoyland.com

Kip’s Toyland, founded in 1945, is the oldest toy store in Los Angeles. Located in the Farmers Market, the store was the brainchild of Irvin Kipper, a U.S. Air Force bomber pilot who, during World War II, was shot down in his B-17 over Bologna, Italy, on his 26th mission. Kipper spent more than seven months in Stalag Luft III and Stalag VII, later retold in book, television, and film as The Great Escape.

== History ==
Kip first started selling flags, then added balloons, which were a big hit, because rubber was rationed during World War II. Then he added Slinky, board games, Lincoln Logs, Tinkertoy sets, Carrom Game Boards, and new toys as they were invented.

Kip's Toyland is still family owned, with the current owners being Don Kipper, son of founder Irvin "Kip" Kipper, and his daughter, Lily. They recently celebrated their 75th anniversary in November 2020.

== Crisis ==
Like many brick-and-mortar stores, Kip's Toyland has had difficulty for years due to more people shopping online. Unfortunately, with the start of COVID-19 lockdowns in Los Angeles in March 2020, Kip's Toyland experienced even more difficulty. Due to this reality, Kip's Toyland started selling toys online for the first time. As of 2025, their website has not been updated.

== See also ==
- Learning Express Toys
