= John Lloyd Wright =

American architect (1892–1972)

- Born: December 12, 1892; Oak Park, Illinois, U.S.
- Died: December 20, 1972 (aged 80); Del Mar, California, U.S.
- Occupation: Architect
- Spouses: Jeanette Winters (m. 1913; div. 1920) Hazel Lundin (m. 1921; div. 1942) Frances Welch (m. 1946)
- Children: Elizabeth Wright Ingraham
- Parent(s): Frank Lloyd Wright; Catherine Tobin
- Projects: Long Beach, Indiana

John Lloyd Wright (December 12, 1892 – December 20, 1972) was an American architect and toy inventor. Born in Oak Park, Illinois, Wright was the second-oldest son of architect Frank Lloyd Wright. John Lloyd Wright became estranged from his father in 1909 and subsequently left his home to join his brother on the West Coast. After unsuccessfully working a series of jobs, he decided to take up the profession of his father in 1912. Shortly afterward, he was able to reconnect with his father, who took John under his wing. Differences in opinion regarding the Imperial Hotel, Tokyo caused the pair to again become disaffected.

John Lloyd Wright took a break from architecture after this falling-out and focused on designing toys. The most successful of these inventions was Lincoln Logs in 1916, which would later be one of the original inductees into the National Toy Hall of Fame. In 1923, Wright moved to Long Beach, Indiana and designed several buildings. His style was characterized by the Prairie School of architecture with International Style influences. After marrying a third time in 1946, Wright left Indiana for Del Mar, California, where he spent the rest of his life designing houses.

== Biography ==
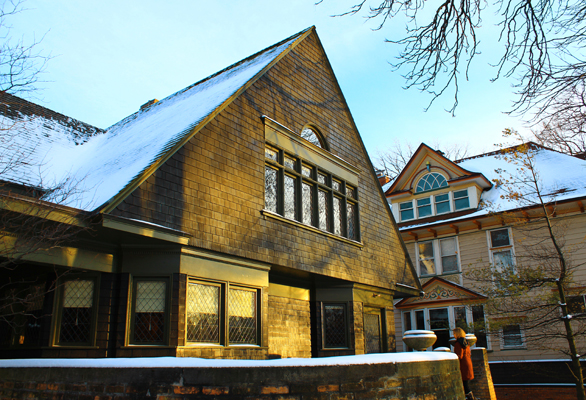
John Lloyd Wright was born and raised in the Frank Lloyd Wright Home and Studio in Oak Park, Illinois.

=== Early life ===
John Lloyd Wright was born on December 12, 1892, while his father, Frank Lloyd Wright, was practicing in Chicago with Adler & Sullivan. He was the second-oldest of the six children of Frank Lloyd and Catherine Wright. They lived in Oak Park, Illinois, in what is now known as the Frank Lloyd Wright Home and Studio. John became estranged from his father in 1909, when Frank abandoned his family to be with Mamah Borthwick Cheney. John was accepted to the University of Wisconsin-Madison shortly after, but soon dropped out. He moved to Portland, Oregon, to get away from his family. He traveled with his elder brother, Lloyd Wright, to San Diego, California, where they worked with the Olmsted Brothers as they prepared for the Panama–Pacific International Exposition. He also sold posters designed by his brother and briefly worked a job pressing pants. Destitute and without direction, he decided to take up the profession of his father and become an architect.

=== Early architecture ===
While walking in San Diego, he saw a sign calling for a draftsman for the Pacific Building Company. Wright was hired and drew architectural details for bungalows. He soon realized that he had a talent for the profession and sought out a professional architectural firm. He found a position in the firm of Harrison Albright, one of the preeminent architects in Los Angeles. Originally acting as a clerk, Wright received his first design commission for a house in Escondido in 1912. The design was heavily borrowed from his father's Sherman M. Booth House in Glencoe, Illinois. Pleased with the results, Albright gave Wright the opportunity to design the Workingman's Hotel, a three-story building. During the project, Wright worked closely with sculptor Alfonso Iannelli, whom he would befriend. After the hotel was completed, Wright determined that he should receive formal architectural training. He intended to apprentice with Vienna Secession architect Otto Wagner in exchange for room and board in Vienna, Austria.

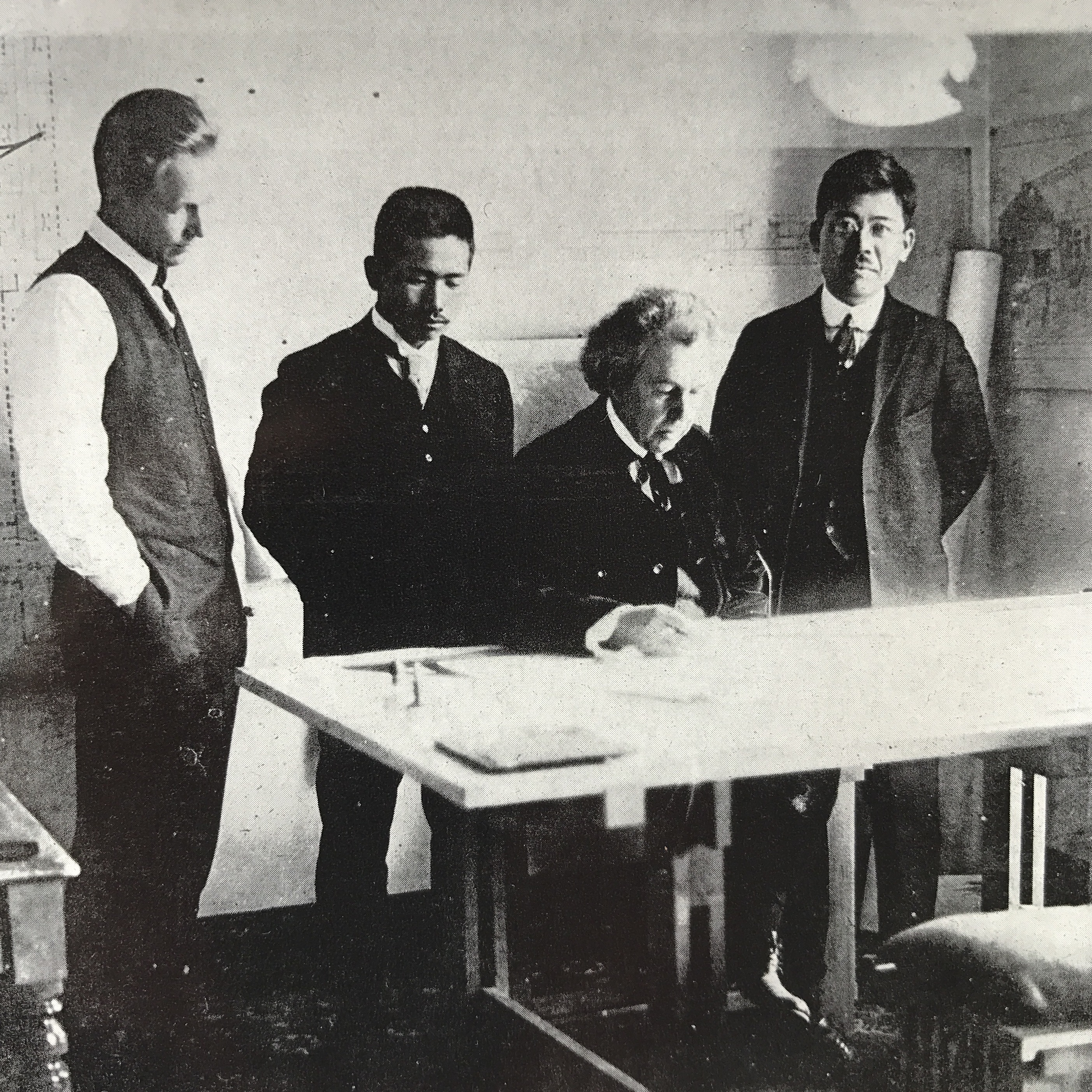
From left, John Lloyd Wright, Arata Endo, Frank Lloyd Wright and Aisaku Hayashi in Japan, designing the Imperial Hotel.

After John wrote a letter to his father, asking him for money for a ticket to Vienna, Frank wrote back that John was welcome to train with him. He accepted the opportunity, but struggled under the dominating personality of his father. In 1913, upon completion of Taliesin I, Frank left Chicago for Wisconsin and placed John in charge of his Chicago office. John oversaw the construction of Midway Gardens, utilizing sculpture from his friend Iannelli. John accompanied his father to Japan to oversee the design of the Imperial Hotel. However, an argument over John's salary resulted in his firing and the two again became estranged.

In 1913, John married Jeanette Winters, whom he had met in Los Angeles. He designed a home for them in Chicago they called the Bird Center. Now without an architectural practice, John focused on some of his hobbies, including toys. It was at this time that he perfected the design for his Lincoln Logs, an idea he had conceived while in Japan. Construction of the Imperial Hotel required beams to be designed in an interlocking method to make it safe for earthquakes, and John realized that this design could be adapted into a toy version. He used his own funds to bring the idea to market in 1918 as the Red Square Toy Company (so named after his father's famous symbol). The toys were notched miniature logs about 1.5 centimetres (0.59 in) in diameter that could be arranged to build miniature log cabins. Wright received a patent on August 31, 1920, and had the name registered on August 28, 1923. Wright later sold the patent which became one of the most popular toys ever designed.

=== Long Beach and Del Mar ===
In 1920, John and Jeanette divorced; Wright moved back to the Oak Park studio with his mother. He remarried in 1921 to Hazel Lundin, and they had a child, Elizabeth, in 1922.

John sought out his father's former employer, Louis Sullivan, and had a series of conversations which inspired him to practice architecture again. The next year, he and his family moved to Long Beach, Indiana, so that he could establish his own, independent practice. Wright also opened a second office in the Warren Building in nearby Michigan City. His second child, John Lloyd Wright, Jr., was born in 1925. During this time John's designs began to shift from his father's Prairie School style to the emerging International Style. This transition was particularly notable following a 1929 trip to Europe. Among the houses he designed were the Hoover-Timme House (1929), John and Isabel Burnham House (1934), Lowell E. and Paula G. Jackson House (1938), and George and Adele Jaworowski House (1945-1946), all listed on the National Register of Historic Places in 2013.

Aside from houses, Wright was also commissioned to build the local elementary school and town hall. Because Long Beach was populated with wealthy vacationers, Wright was able to receive a steady stream of commissions during the Great Depression. Wright received two Works Progress Administration commissions during the depression, including the Arcade Cabins Hotel in Indiana Dunes State Park. In 1939, a fire devastated Wright's house when his automobile caught fire in his garage. The fire destroyed most of his records and designs. Like his father, Wright fell in love with one of his clients, Frances Welsh, and left his family.

During World War II, residential commissions stopped. Wright did manage to receive a commission to design two buildings for the Kingsbury Ordnance Plant 20 miles south of Long Beach. In 1946, Wright published a biography of his father, My Father Who Is on Earth. Wright and Hazel Lundin were divorced in 1942, and Wright married Frances Welsh in 1946. Wright designed a home for him and his third wife in Del Mar, California, later that year. He also resumed his architectural toy designs, designing Wright Blocks and Timber Toys. He designed nearly four dozen houses in California until his death on December 20, 1972, eight days after his eightieth birthday.

== Bibliography ==
- Wright, John Lloyd. My Father Who Is On Earth. New York: G.P. Putnam's sons, 1946. ISBN 0-8093-1749-4
