= UK Championships =

UK Championships may refer to:

- UK Athletics Championships, an athletics competition only open to competitors from the United Kingdom
- UK Championship, a professional ranking snooker tournament
- UK Championship (golf), a professional golf tournament on the European Tour
- Formula Renault UK championship, one of the British Formula Renault Championship Formula Renault championships
- TCR UK Touring Car Championship
- WWE United Kingdom Championship, a professional wrestling championship owned by WWE
- National Scrabble Championship (UK), a British national tournament for the Scrabble board game
- UK Beatbox Championships
- Air Guitar UK Championships
- UK Rock Paper Scissors Championships
- UK Championship (International Federation of Strength Athletes)
- K*bot UK Championships, a qualifying competition for the K*bot World Championships
- Argentine Tango UK Official Championship

== See also ==
- British Championships (disambiguation)
