= Hoover-Timme House =

Historic house in Indiana, United States

- U.S. National Register of Historic Places
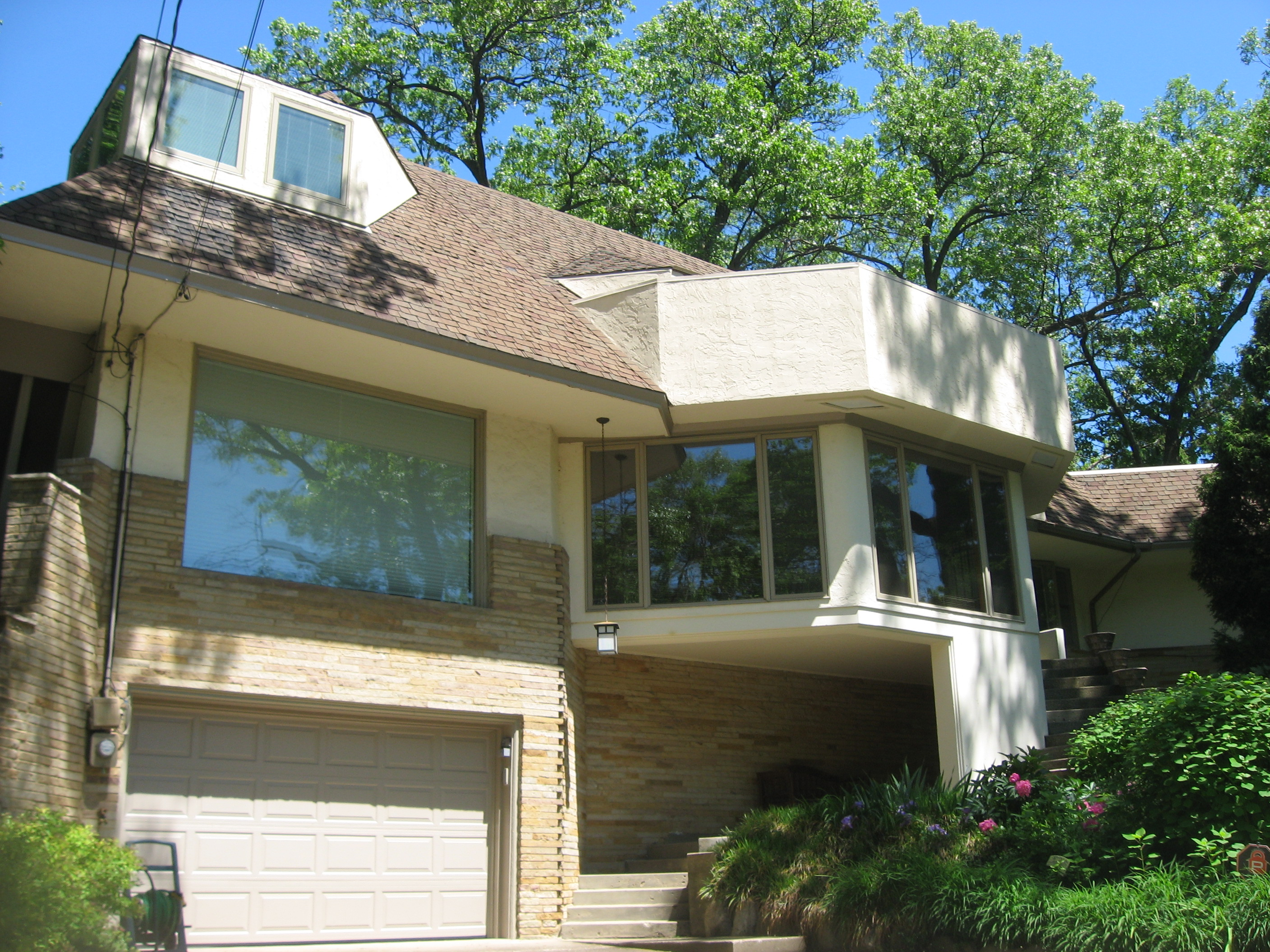
- Hoover-Timme House, June 2013

- Location within Indiana Location within the United States
- Location: 2304 Hazeltine Dr., Long Beach, Indiana
- Coordinates: 41°44′42″N 86°51′19″W
- Area: Less than 1 acre (0.40 ha)
- Built: 1929
- Architect: Wright, John Lloyd
- Architectural style: Prairie School
- MPS: John Lloyd Wright in Northwest Indiana
- NRHP reference No.: 13000086
- Added to NRHP: August 1, 2013

Hoover-Timme House is a historic home located at Long Beach, Indiana. It was designed by architect John Lloyd Wright and built in 1929. It is a three level house carved into a sand dune on the shore of Lake Michigan. The house is in a rambling Prairie School style with hipped and mansard roof forms. The house is sheathed in ashlar sandstone and stucco. Also contributing is the house site.

It was listed on the National Register of Historic Places in 2013.
