= Lowell E. and Paula G. Jackson House =

Historic house in Indiana, United States

- U.S. National Register of Historic Places
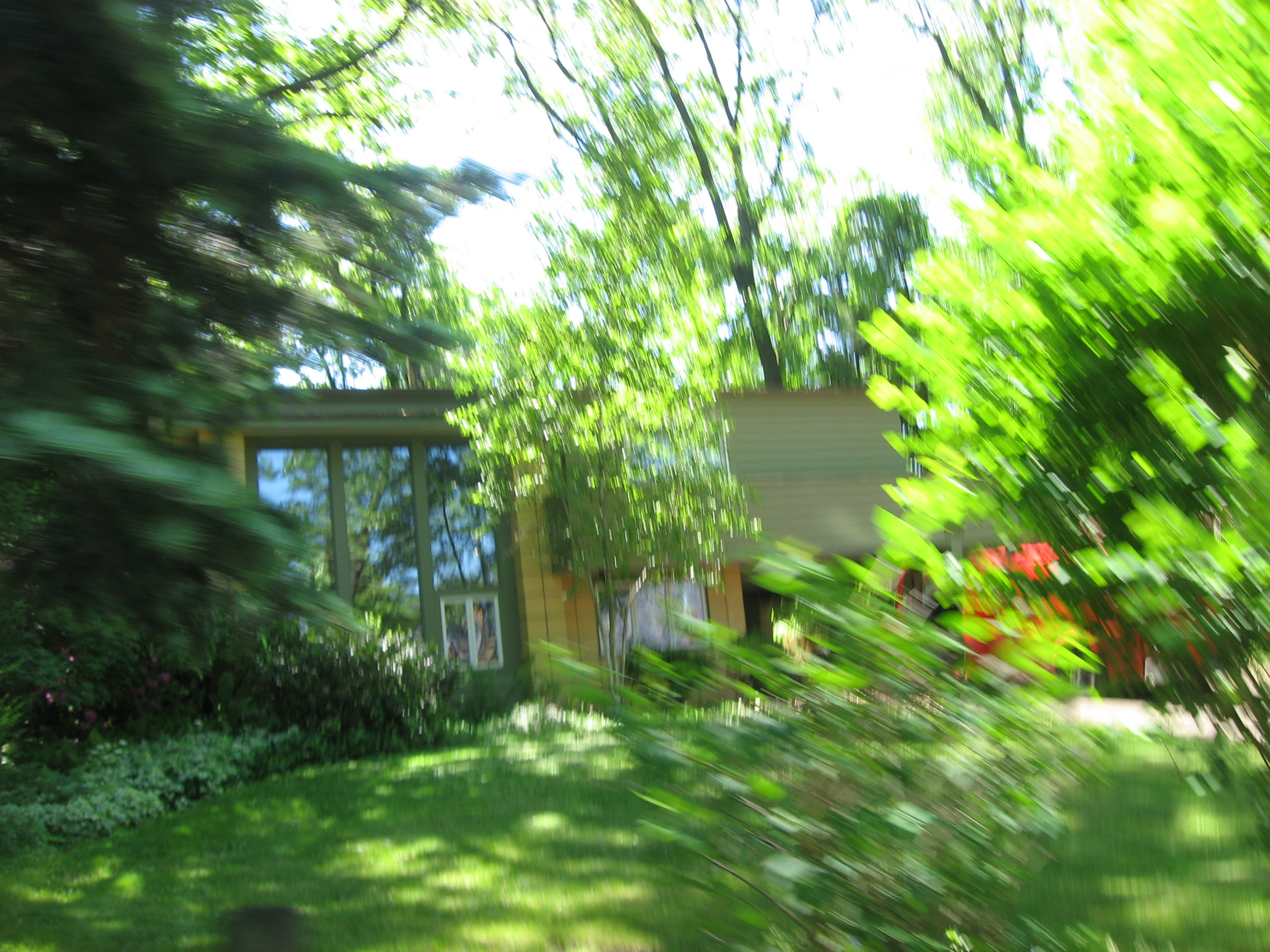
- Lowell E. and Paula G. Jackson House, June 2013

- Location within Indiana Location within the United States
- Location: 2935 Ridge Rd., Long Beach, Indiana
- Coordinates: 41°45′07″N 86°50′24″W
- Area: 0.25 acres (0.10 ha)
- Built: 1938
- Architect: Wright, John Lloyd
- Architectural style: International Style
- MPS: John Lloyd Wright in Northwest Indiana
- NRHP reference No.: 13000087
- Added to NRHP: August 1, 2013

Lowell E. and Paula G. Jackson House, also known as the House of Tile, is a historic home located at Long Beach, Indiana. It was designed by architect John Lloyd Wright and built in 1938. The house is constructed of 12 inch square clay tiles painted green and carved into a sand dune on the shore of Lake Michigan. The house has horizontal clapboard siding and is in the International Style of architecture. The house has three levels and a carport. Also contributing is the house site.

It was listed on the National Register of Historic Places in 2013.
