= Long Beach, Indiana =

- Town
- Seal

- Location of Long Beach in LaPorte County, Indiana.
- Coordinates: 41°44′44″N 86°51′05″W
- Country: United States
- State: Indiana
- County: LaPorte
- Township: Michigan
- Incorporated: 1921

Area
  - Total: 1.12 sq mi (2.89 km^{2})
  - Land: 1.04 sq mi (2.70 km^{2})
  - Water: 0.073 sq mi (0.19 km^{2})
- Elevation: 614 ft (187 m)

Population (2020)
  - Total: 1,189
  - Density: 1,140.6/sq mi (440.37/km^{2})
- Time zone: UTC-6 (Central (CST))
  - Summer (DST): UTC-5 (CDT)
- ZIP code: 46360
- Area code: 219
- FIPS code: 18-44784
- GNIS feature ID: 2396723
- Website: www.longbeachin.org

Long Beach is a town in Michigan Township, LaPorte County, Indiana, United States. As of the 2020 census, Long Beach had a population of 1,189. It is included in the Michigan City, Indiana-La Porte, Indiana Metropolitan statistical area.

== History ==
Long Beach was incorporated in 1921 as a resort town. It was named for the sand beaches of Lake Michigan.

The Hoover-Timme House (1929), John and Isabel Burnham House (1934), and Lowell E. and Paula G. Jackson House (1938) were listed on the National Register of Historic Places in 2013.

== Geography ==
According to the 2010 census, Long Beach has a total area of 3.15 square miles (8.16 km^{2}), of which 1.06 square miles (2.75 km^{2}) (or 33.65%) is land and 2.09 square miles (5.41 km^{2}) (or 66.35%) is water.

== Demographics ==
Historical population
Census	Pop.	Note	%±
1930	436		—
1940	455		4.4%
1950	1,103		142.4%
1960	2,007		82.0%
1970	2,740		36.5%
1980	2,262		−17.4%
1990	2,044		−9.6%
2000	1,559		−23.7%
2010	1,179		−24.4%
2020	1,189		0.8%
Source: US Census Bureau

=== 2020 census ===
As of the 2020 census, Long Beach had a population of 1,189. The median age was 63.2 years. 9.1% of residents were under the age of 18 and 45.8% of residents were 65 years of age or older. For every 100 females there were 94.0 males, and for every 100 females age 18 and over there were 94.4 males age 18 and over.

100.0% of residents lived in urban areas, while 0.0% lived in rural areas.

There were 596 households in Long Beach, of which 11.1% had children under the age of 18 living in them. Of all households, 54.4% were married-couple households, 18.1% were households with a male householder and no spouse or partner present, and 24.0% were households with a female householder and no spouse or partner present. About 33.6% of all households were made up of individuals and 21.4% had someone living alone who was 65 years of age or older.

There were 1,093 housing units, of which 45.5% were vacant. The homeowner vacancy rate was 2.8% and the rental vacancy rate was 21.2%.

Racial composition as of the 2020 census
Race	Number	Percent
White	1,118	94.0%
Black or African American	20	1.7%
American Indian and Alaska Native	0	0.0%
Asian	15	1.3%
Native Hawaiian and Other Pacific Islander	0	0.0%
Some other race	1	0.1%
Two or more races	35	2.9%
Hispanic or Latino (of any race)	18	1.5%

=== 2010 census ===
As of the census of 2010, there were 1,179 people, 555 households, and 366 families living in the town. The population density was 1,112.3 inhabitants per square mile (429.5/km^{2}). There were 1,093 housing units at an average density of 1,031.1 per square mile (398.1/km^{2}). The racial makeup of the town was 96.8% White, 1.4% African American, 0.3% Native American, 1.1% Asian, 0.2% from other races, and 0.2% from two or more races. Hispanic or Latino of any race were 0.6% of the population.

There were 555 households, of which 14.4% had children under the age of 18 living with them, 59.6% were married couples living together, 4.1% had a female householder with no husband present, 2.2% had a male householder with no wife present, and 34.1% were non-families. 30.6% of all households were made up of individuals, and 16.4% had someone living alone who was 65 years of age or older. The average household size was 2.12 and the average family size was 2.64.

The median age in the town was 58 years. 14.2% of residents were under the age of 18; 4.4% were between the ages of 18 and 24; 10% were from 25 to 44; 39.6% were from 45 to 64; and 32.1% were 65 years of age or older. The gender makeup of the town was 48.2% male and 51.8% female.

=== 2000 census ===
As of the census of 2000, there were 1,559 people, 661 households, and 473 families living in the town. The population density was 1,495.7 inhabitants per square mile (577.5/km^{2}). There were 1,071 housing units at an average density of 1,027.5 per square mile (396.7/km^{2}). The racial makeup of the town was 97.69% White, 0.38% African American, 0.13% Native American, 1.03% Asian, and 0.77% from two or more races. Hispanic or Latino of any race were 0.71% of the population.

There were 661 households, out of which 22.7% had children under the age of 18 living with them, 65.7% were married couples living together, 4.5% had a female householder with no husband present, and 28.3% were non-families. 25.6% of all households were made up of individuals, and 15.4% had someone living alone who was 65 years of age or older. The average household size was 2.36 and the average family size was 2.84.

In the town, the population was spread out, with 19.9% under the age of 18, 4.9% from 18 to 24, 14.2% from 25 to 44, 35.2% from 45 to 64, and 25.8% who were 65 years of age or older. The median age was 50 years. For every 100 females, there were 90.6 males. For every 100 females age 18 and over, there were 90.0 males.

The median income for a household in the town was $71,364, and the median income for a family was $84,532. Males had a median income of $71,563 versus $41,250 for females. The per capita income for the town was $43,159. None of the families and 0.9% of the population were living below the poverty line, including no residents under eighteens and none of those over 64.

== Education ==
Michigan City Area Schools is the school district covering the municipality. For this municipality, the zoned elementary school for almost all areas is Springfield Elementary School, with some portions to the west zoned to Lake Hills Elementary School. The zoned middle school is Krueger Middle School, and Michigan City High School is the district's sole comprehensive high school.

Long Beach residents are served by the Michigan City Public Library. Long Beach residents may also request a free library card from any La Porte County Public Library branch.

== Features ==
Located on the southeast shore of Lake Michigan, Long Beach is a residential community in a landscape of tree-covered dunes. It has a shoreline of approximately 3 miles and a maximum depth of 3/4 miles. Residents tend to be a mixture of permanent residents and individuals visiting Long Beach on weekends or for the summer, the latter group mostly individuals from nearby Chicago.

Long Beach purchases municipal water from adjoining Michigan City and has few sewers and sidewalks. The majority of homes have septic systems for waste water disposal. The government includes a five-member town council, a clerk treasurer, a police department, a volunteer fire department, a parks department. Long Beach has a very small business center and a private golf course/country club, Long Beach Country Club.

Long Beach also has the old Long Beach School and uses it as the Community Center, which houses the Long Beach Fitness Center, now operated by the LaPorte County YMCA. Anyone owning property in Long Beach, IN can access the Fitness Center.

Michigan City Transit's Route 3 Bus stops near the town's southern border at Karwick Plaza, immediately north of Karwick Road/Route 12 intersection. It links the town to the South Shore Line's Carroll Avenue station Monday-Saturday and allows its residents to reach downtown Michigan City. The closest Amtrak station is located in downtown Michigan City, at 100 Washington Street.

== Notable people ==
Long Beach was the childhood home of Chief Justice John Roberts and Siri founder Dag Kittlaus. Hunter Biden, son of President Joe Biden, owned a home in Long Beach near Lake Michigan. Frank Lloyd Wright's son John Lloyd Wright lived here and established an architectural practice, designing many houses in the area.

Hal Higdon, noted American distance runner and author, also lives in Long Beach, Indiana.
