= British Championship =

British Championships or British Championship may refer to:

- The Amateur Championship (sometimes referred to as the British Amateur or British Amateur Championship outside of the UK) (golf)
- BMW PGA Championship (originally called the British PGA Championship) (golf)
- British Athletics Championships
- British Championship (ice hockey)
- British Chess Championship
- British Drift Championship
- British Figure Skating Championships
- British Firework Championships
- British Flyweight Championship (professional wrestling)
- British Formula Three Championship
- British GT Championship
- British Heavyweight Championship (professional wrestling)
- British Heavyweight Championship (XWA) (professional wrestling)
- British Hill Climb Championship
- British Home Championship (football)
- British Lightweight Championship (professional wrestling)
- British Motocross Championship
- British Open Championship Golf (video game)
- British Professional Championship (darts)
- British Quizzing Championships
- British Rally Championship
- British Rallycross Championship
- British Riders' Championship (motorcycle speedway)
- British Roller Derby Championships
- British Rowing Championships
- British Speedway Championship
- British Superbike Championship Support Series
- British Supersport Championship
- British Touring Car Championship
- British Welterweight Championship (professional wrestling)
- EFL Championship (a league of the English Football League)
- Mobil 1 Rally Championship (officially called Mobil 1 British Rally Championship) (video game)
- The Open Championship (often referred to as the British Open) (golf)
- RBW British Middleweight Championship (professional wrestling)
- Senior Open Championship (originally known as the Senior British Open) (golf)
- Triple Crown Tournament (cricket)

== Bike ==
- British National Hill Climb Championships
- British National Road Race Championships
- British National Track Championships
  - British National Madison Championships
- British National Cyclo-cross Championships
- British National Derny Championships

== See also ==
- UK Championship (disambiguation)
