= John and Isabel Burnham House =

Historic house in Indiana, United States

- U.S. National Register of Historic Places
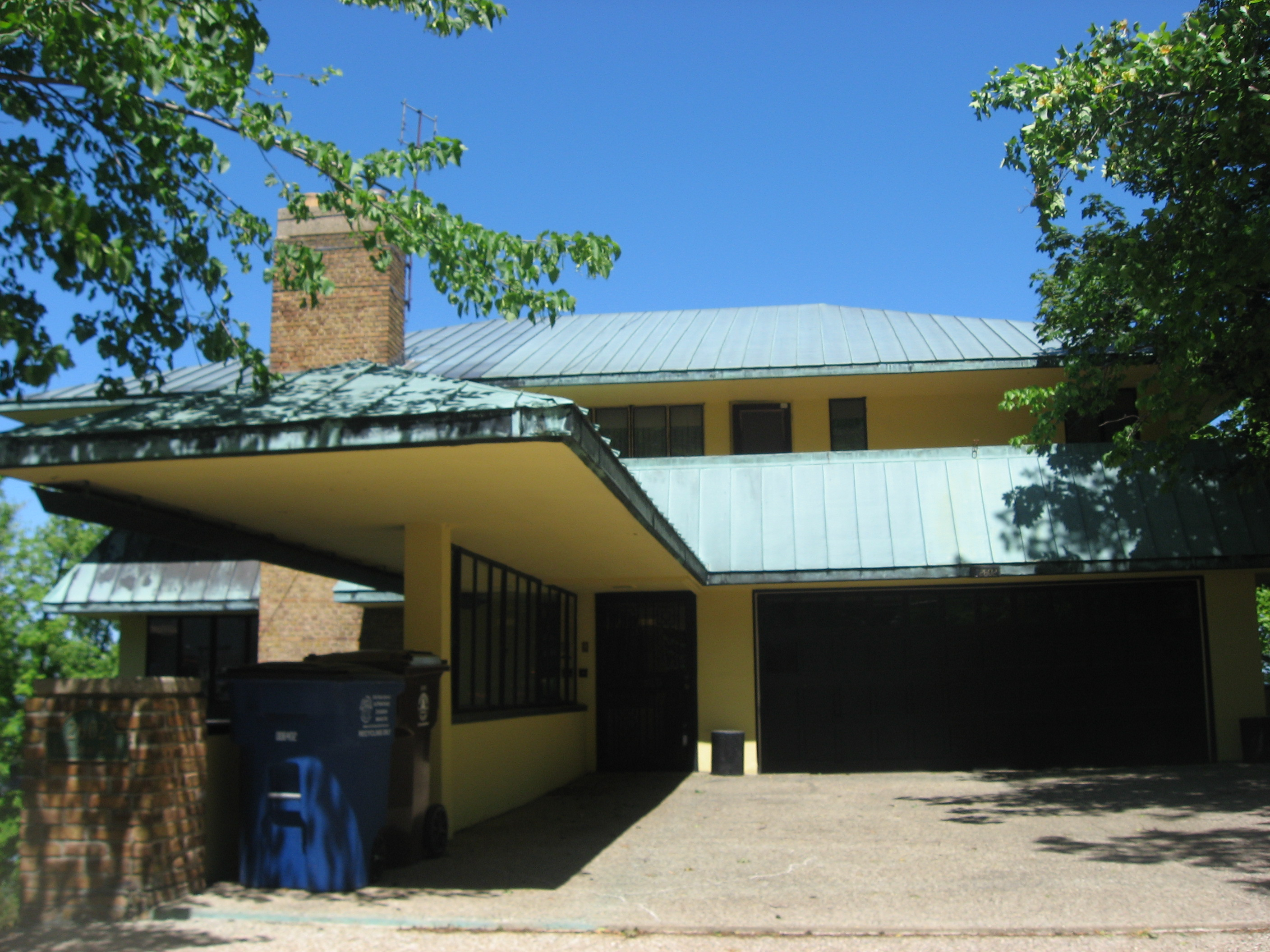
- John and Isabel Burnham House, June 2013

- Location within Indiana Location within the United States
- Location: 2602 Lake Shore Dr., Long Beach, Indiana
- Coordinates: 41°44′56″N 86°50′58″W
- Area: Less than 1 acre (0.40 ha)
- Built: 1934
- Architect: Wright, John Lloyd
- Architectural style: Prairie School, International Style
- MPS: John Lloyd Wright in Northwest Indiana
- NRHP reference No.: 13000085
- Added to NRHP: August 1, 2013

John and Isabel Burnham House, also known as the Pagoda House, is a historic home located at Long Beach, Indiana. It was designed by architect John Lloyd Wright and built in 1934. It is a five level house located on the shore of Lake Michigan. The house is a blend of Prairie School and International Style architecture with hipped and pent roof forms. The house is sheathed in stucco and salmon colored brick. Also contributing is the house site with extensive stone terracing.

It was listed on the National Register of Historic Places in 2013.
