= Free Universal Construction Kit =

3D-printable open source construction toy

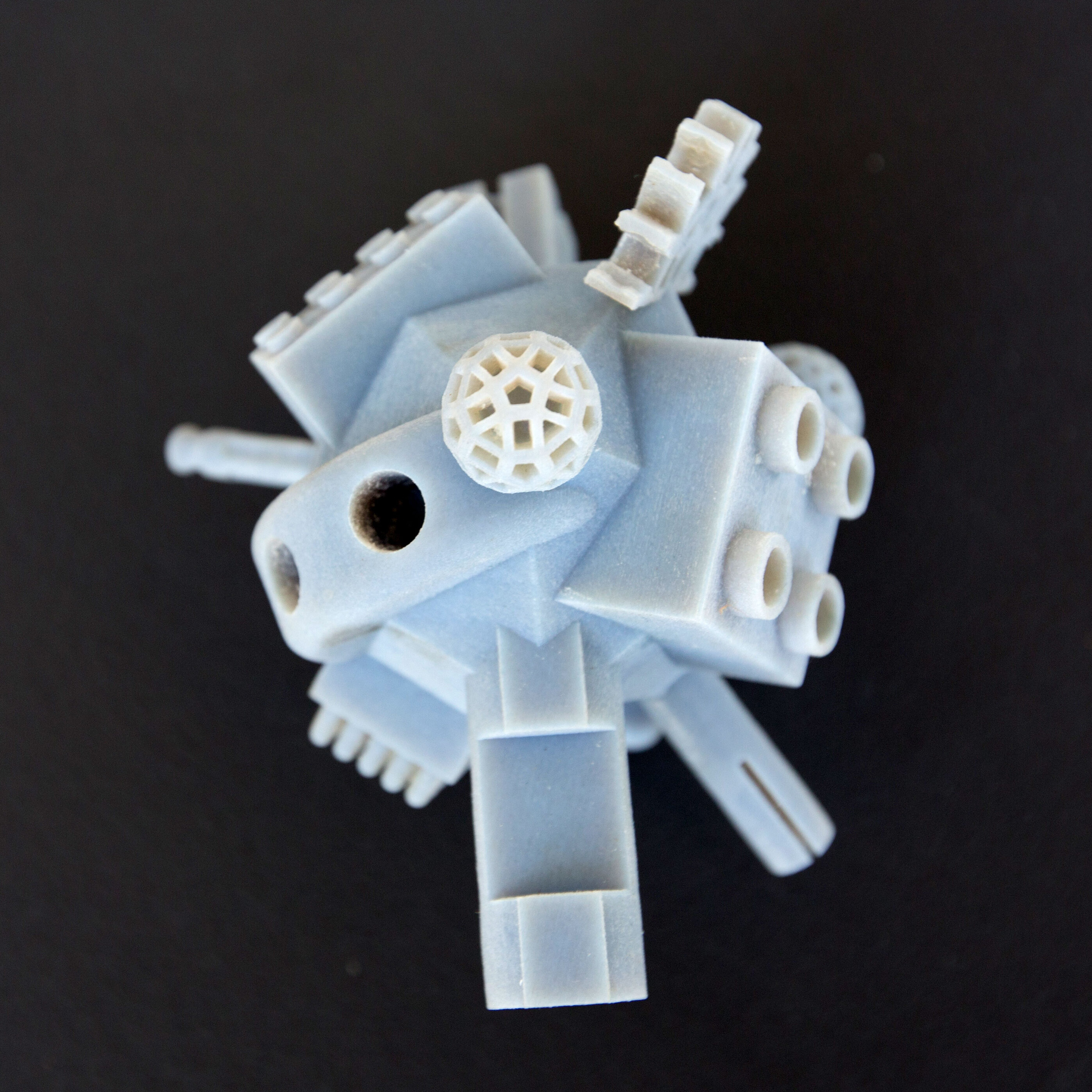
- Detail of "Universal Adapter Brick"
- Type: Construction set
- Invented by: Golan Levin; Shawn Sims
- Company: F.A.T. Lab + Sy-Lab.
- Country: US
- Availability: 2012–present
- Materials: Laser sintered plastic or similar
- Features: Interconnectivity between construction toys; Open source; 3D printable pieces
- Slogan: Ever wanted to connect your Legos and Tinkertoys together? Now you can — and much more.
- fffff.at/free-universal-construction-kit

The Free Universal Construction Kit is a collection of open source 3D-printable adapters that facilitate and enhance creative play by enabling "interoperability between ten popular children's construction toys."

== Overview ==
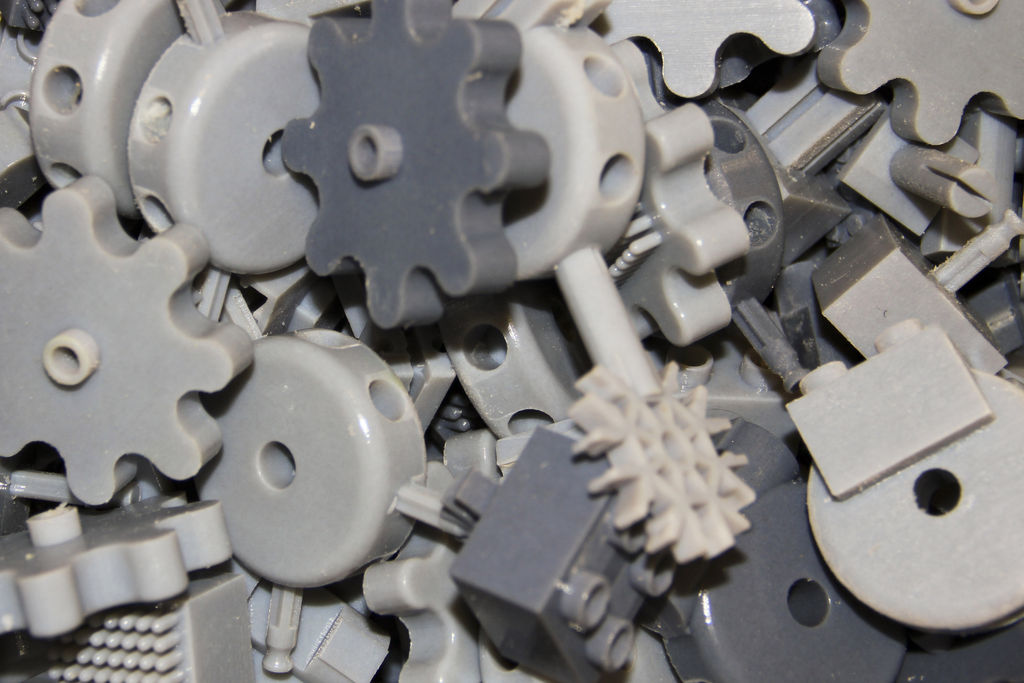
Examples of pieces printed "in the wild" by end users (2013)

The Free Universal Construction Kit (F.U.C.K.) was developed at Carnegie Mellon University by Golan Levin and Shawn Sims in 2012. The open source project was conceived to facilitate play by allowing for interconnectivity between unrelated and otherwise incompatible toy construction sets. It is a "matrix" of 3D-printable adapter pieces that were reverse engineered to permit Duplo, Fischertechnik, Gears! Gears! Gears!, K'Nex, Stickle Bricks (a.k.a. Krinkles Bristle Blocks), Lego, Lincoln Logs, Tinkertoys, Zometool, and ZOOB to be easily assembled with each other. The inspiration for the project came from Levin's observations of his own young son's frustration with the difficulty he experienced when attempting to connect pieces from these otherwise exclusive, incompatible, and closed-loop toy systems.

The Free Universal Construction Kit system, as described by the designers, is a "grassroots interoperability [remedy]" that "implements proprietary protocols in order to provide a public service unmet, or unmeetable, by corporate interests." It includes approximately 80 individual pieces which were engineered and modelled using micrometre precise data (less than .0001 of an inch) gathered by taking optical comparator measurements of each of the construction toy systems included in the kit – ensuring that the custom pieces and commercial components fit snugly together without alteration, special tools, adhesive tape or glue. Most of the individual pieces allow the user to connect two systems (e.g., Lego bricks ⇆ Lincoln Logs, Lincoln Logs ⇆ Tinkertoys, etc.), however, the matrix also includes a "Universal Adapter Brick" that integrates the connectors of all ten of the referenced construction sets into one single larger element.

A library of digital 3D models of the Free Universal Construction Kit in the stereo lithograph printing format is available from a number of online sources. These STL files can be freely downloaded and used to reproduce the pieces in a variety of materials with various 3D manufacturing devices and technologies.

== Reception ==
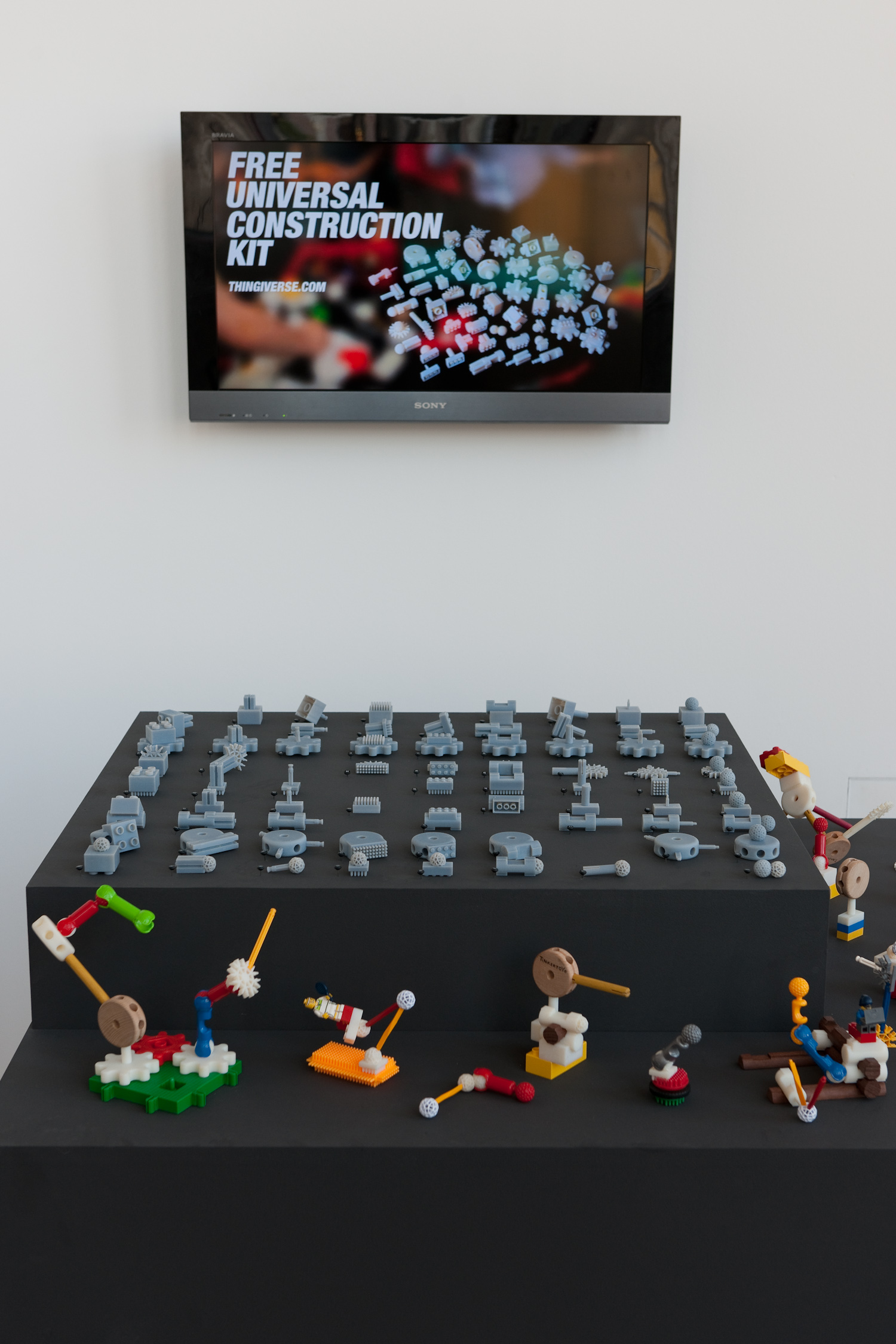
Free Universal Construction Kit pictured at Ars Electronica exhibition, Offenes Kulturhaus museum, Linz, Austria (2012)

The Free Universal Construction Kit was exhibited during the 2012 edition of Ars Electronica in the Offenes Kulturhaus museum in Linz, Austria. It received the Ars Electronica Award of Distinction. It has also been exhibited at Node Forum for Digital Arts in the Künstler Mousonturm in Frankfurt am Main; Fundación Telefónica, Madrid, Spain; BOZAR Center of Fine Arts, Brussels, Belgium; Kunsthaus Pasquart, Biel/Bienne, Switzerland; London Design Museum; Miller Gallery at Carnegie Mellon University; Gray Area Foundation for the Arts, San Francisco; and the Center for Bits and Atoms at MIT's Media Lab in Cambridge, Massachusetts, amongst other venues.

The Free Universal Construction Kit system is in the collection of several museums, including the Cooper Hewitt, Smithsonian Design Museum, and the Museum of Modern Art (MoMA) in New York. It was also included in MoMA's 2025 exhibition, Pirouette: Turning Points in Design, featuring "widely recognized design icons [...] highlighting pivotal moments in design history".

== See also ==
- Educational toy
