= Sherman Booth House =

- Summer 1919

General information
- Architectural style: Prairie School
- Town or city: Glencoe, IL
- Coordinates: 42°08′42″N 87°45′51″W
- Completed: 1916

Technical details
- Floor count: 3

Design and construction
- Architect(s): Frank Lloyd Wright
- Main contractor: H. A. Peters and Company
- Designations: Glencoe Honorary Landmark: April 9, 1993

The Sherman Booth House is a Prairie Style house designed by architect Frank Lloyd Wright at 265 Sylvan Road in Glencoe, IL. The house was built as the primary residence for the family of Elizabeth K and Sherman M Booth II in 1916. Sherman Booth II was an attorney at the time for Wright. The house is the largest of six Wright-designed Prairie Style homes in the Ravine Bluffs Development.

Wright had originally designed a grander vision for the Booths in 1911 (known as Scheme 1), but due to the exorbitant cost ($125,000 in 1910) and a financial downturn in the Booths fortunes, he redesigned two existing structures in the design that was built (Scheme 2).

== Architecture ==
The house has a square theme throughout including square door knobs. Unique to most Prairie styles homes at the time, the building is three stories high and has a rooftop deck, a rarity for Wright. Wright designed several pieces of furniture for the house including a dining room table/chairs, a library table, slatted wooden light sconces and a floor lamp reminiscent of a Japanese art print holder.
