= Lincoln Logs =

American construction toy for children

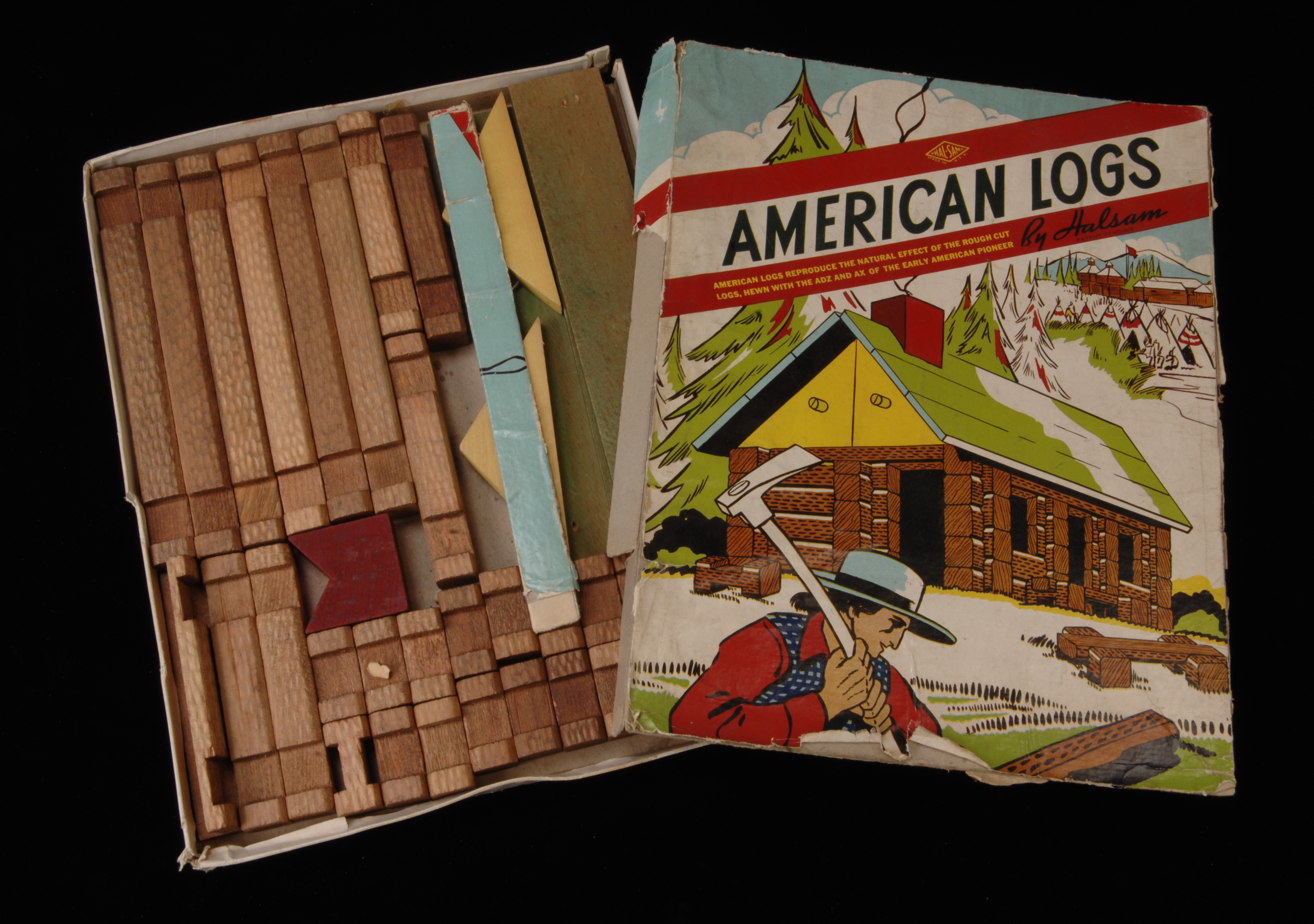
- Vintage Lincoln Logs box and pieces
- Type: Children's construction toy
- Invented by: John Lloyd Wright
- Company: Basic Fun, Inc. (under license from Hasbro)
- Country: United States
- Availability: 1916–present
- Materials: Wood
- Official website

Lincoln Logs are an American construction toy for children, consisting of square-notched miniature lightweight logs used to build small forts and buildings. They were invented around 1916 by John Lloyd Wright, second son of well-known architect Frank Lloyd Wright. Lincoln Logs were inducted into the National Toy Hall of Fame in 1999. They are named after U.S. president Abraham Lincoln, who was born and lived in a log cabin.

Starting in 2014, Lincoln Logs were manufactured by K'NEX Industries Inc. In late 2017, K'NEX was bought out by Basic Fun, Inc., of Florida. Pride Manufacturing, of Burnham, Maine, manufactures Lincoln Logs for Basic Fun, and the rights to the IP are owned by Hasbro. In 2024, Basic Fun filed for Chapter 11 bankruptcy protection. The company will use bankruptcy proceedings to repay its creditors while remaining in operation.

== History ==
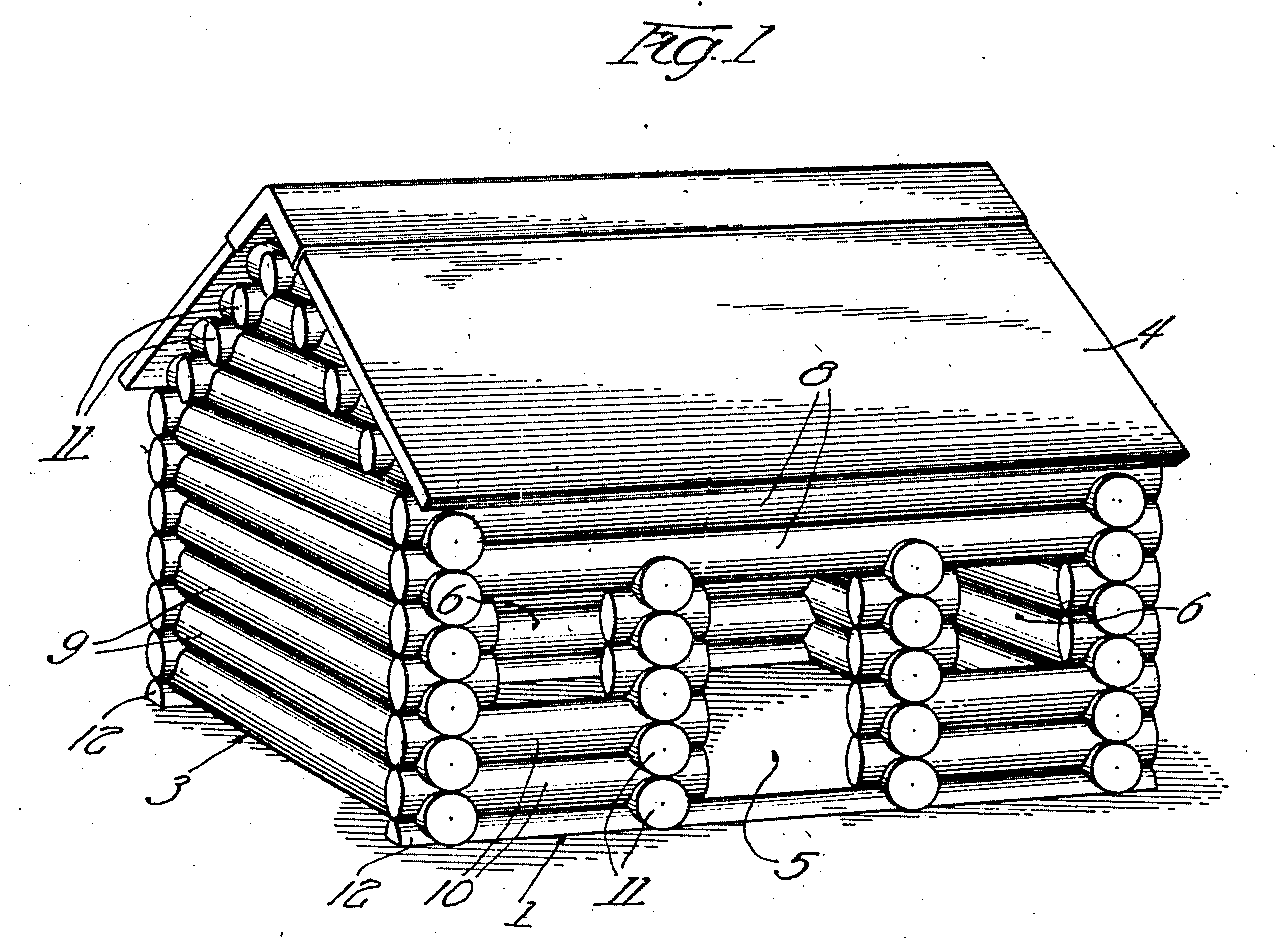
Patent drawing

Lincoln Logs were invented sometime around 1916–1917 when John Lloyd Wright was working in Japan with his father. The mold for the toy was based on the architecture of the Imperial Hotel in Tokyo, designed by the inventor's father. The foundation of the hotel was designed with interlocking log beams, which made the structure "earthquake-proof" and one of the few buildings to remain standing after the 1923 Great Kanto Earthquake that crumbled Tokyo.

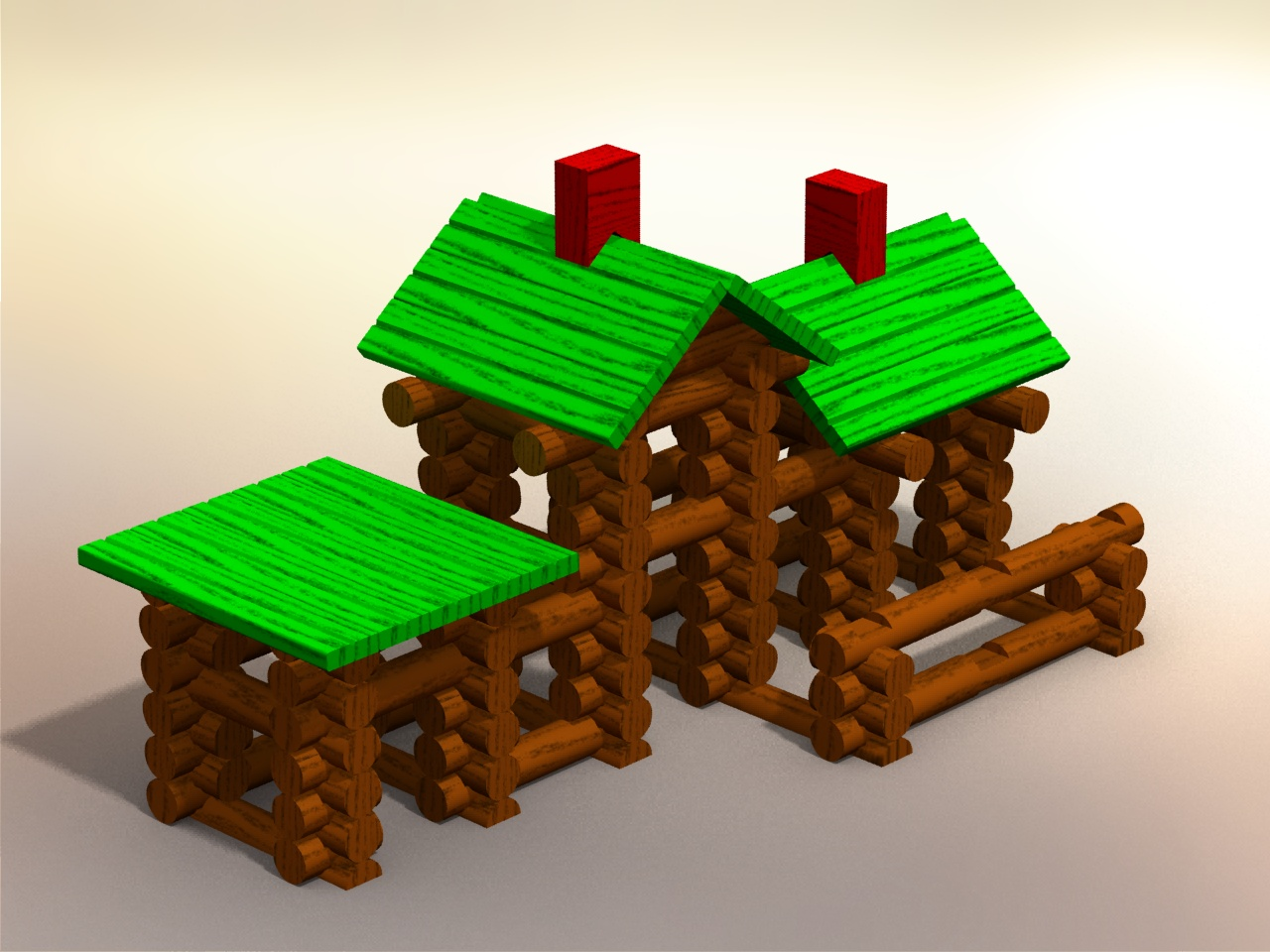
Computer-aided design (CAD) drawing of a house made from Lincoln Logs

When he returned to the U.S., John organized The Red Square Toy Company (named after his father's famous symbol), and marketed the toy in 1918. Wright was issued U.S. patent 1,351,086 on August 31, 1920, for a "Toy-Cabin Construction". Soon after, he changed the name to J. L. Wright Manufacturing. The original Lincoln Log set came with instructions on how to build Uncle Tom's Cabin as well as Abraham Lincoln's cabin. Subsequent sets were larger and more elaborate. The toy was a hit, following as it did Meccano, Tinkertoys and Erector Set introduced a few years before. Lincoln Logs are believed to be the first toy to be marketed to both boys and girls and appeal to a "simple" type of creativity.

In 1999, Lincoln Logs and John Lloyd Wright were entered into the National Toy Hall of Fame. In September 2014, the manufacturer announced the return of production from China to the U.S.; however, Lincoln Log sets with the Basic Fun logo and a copyright date of 2021 or later are now entirely manufactured in China again.

== Design ==
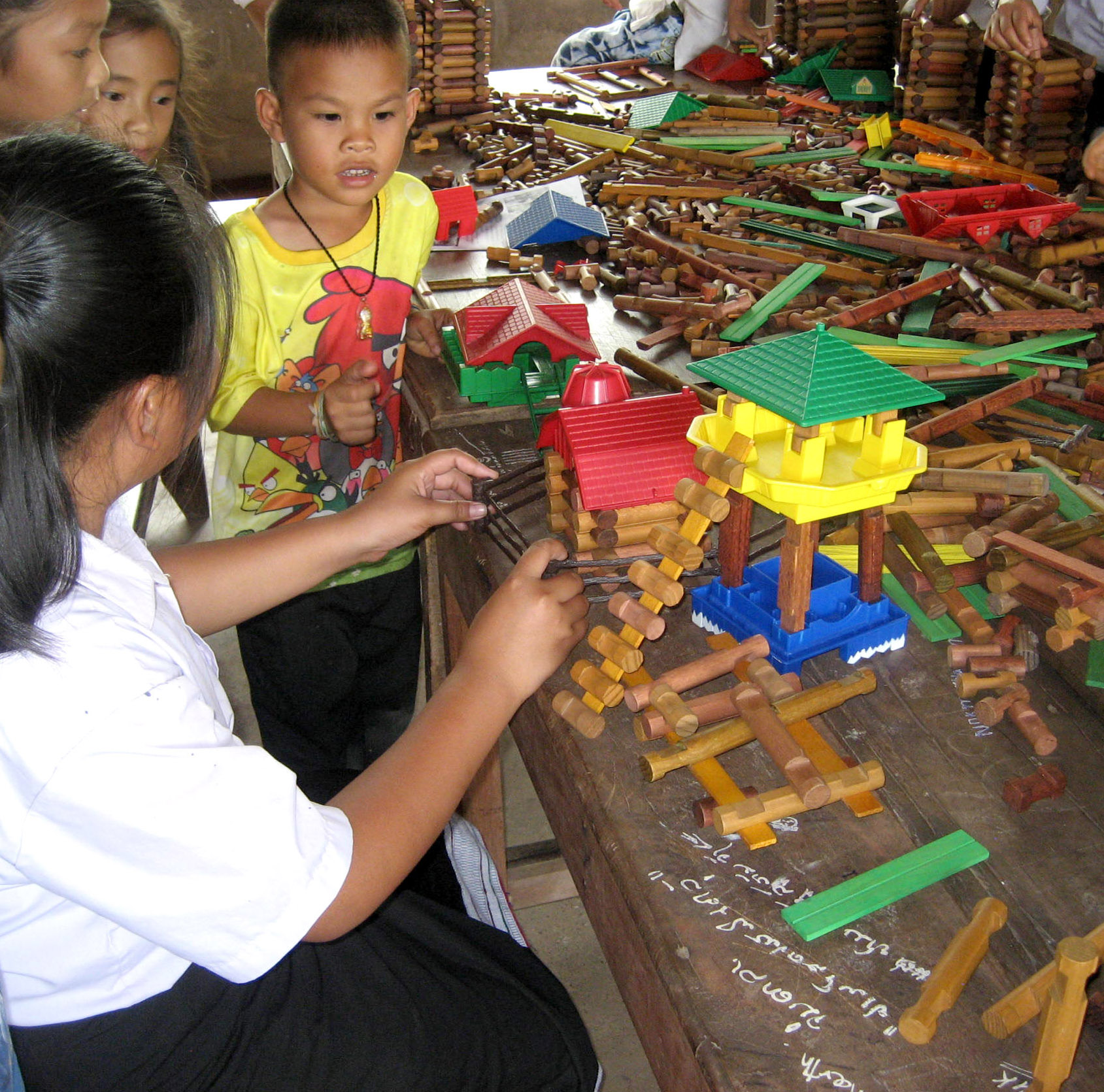
Lincoln logs being used at a workshop in Laos. In the foreground is a model of a Lao-style stilt house.

The logs measure three quarters of an inch (roughly two centimetres) in diameter. Like real logs used in a log cabin, Lincoln Logs are notched so that logs may be laid at right angles to each other to form rectangles resembling buildings. Additional parts of the toy set include roofs, chimneys, windows and doors, which bring a realistic appearance to the final creation. Later sets included animals and human figures the same scale as the buildings.

The toy sets were originally made of redwood, with varying colors of roof pieces. In the 1970s the company introduced sets made entirely of plastic, but soon reverted to real wood.

== See also ==
- K'Nex
- Tinkertoy
- Free Universal Construction Kit – 3D-printable open source construction toy
