= K'Nex =

American toy company

- Type: Construction set
- Invented by: Joel Glickman
- Company: Basic Fun!
- Country: United States
- Availability: October 1992; 33 years ago–present
- Slogan: Imagine, Build, Play; Building Worlds Kids Love; The K'Nex Big Thing; Where Creativity Clicks
- www.basicfun.com/knex/

K'Nex (/kəˈnɛks/ kə-NECKS) is a construction toy system created by Joel Glickman of The Rodon Group. It was first introduced in America in 1992. K'Nex is designed and produced by K'Nex Industries Inc. of Hatfield, Pennsylvania. K'Nex was purchased by Florida-based company Basic Fun! in 2018.

The toy's building system consists of interlocking plastic rods, connectors, blocks, gears, wheels, and other components, which can be assembled to form a wide variety of models, machines, and architectural structures. While K'Nex is designed for children ages 5–12, a bigger version, Kid K'Nex, is aimed towards children 5 and younger.

== History ==
K'Nex was created by Joel Glickman, son of Rodon Group co-founder Irving Glickman. Joel came up with the idea of K'Nex when playing with drinking straws at a wedding. By 1992, Joel already spent time on perfecting the building system before founding the K'Nex Brand with his brother Bob.

The first K'Nex Box was launched in the U.S. market in 1993. Original models with moving parts had a handcrank to make things move, but soon, gears and motors allowed models to move on their own.

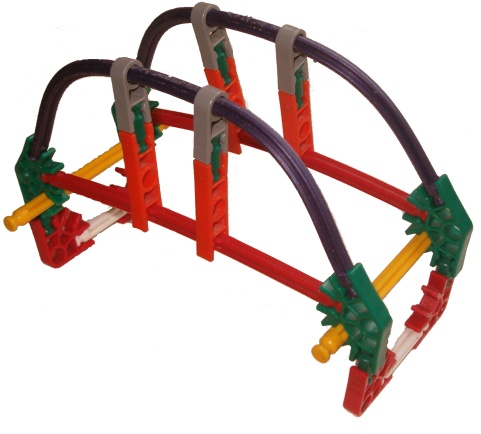
A bridge made from K'Nex

The company's products were sold at Toys "R" Us, starting in early October 1992. Toys "R" Us' head, Charles Lazarus praised the K'Nex system at the 1993 Industry Toy Fair. By 2011, K'Nex was distributed in over 25 countries, including the United States.

In 2018, all of K'Nex's assets were purchased by Basic Fun!, a Florida-based toy company. The acquisition was valued at around $21 million.

In 2024, Basic Fun filed for Chapter 11 bankruptcy protection. The company planned to use bankruptcy proceedings to repay its creditors while remaining in operation. Basic Fun emerged from bankruptcy on November 1, 2024.

== Pieces ==
The basic K'Nex pieces used to make models include rods, connectors, and bricks. Basic K'Nex pieces are made out of polyoxymethylene plastic.

== Display models and exhibits ==
Concordia University's Engineering and Computer Science Association (ECA) has constructed models of a Space Shuttle, the Sears Tower, the Eiffel Tower, Habitat 67, and mazes from K'Nex.

The U.S. Space & Rocket Center in Huntsville, Alabama, held a Guinness World Record for "World's Largest K'Nex Sculpture" for a model space shuttle and rocket displayed in their gift shop. The record was broken in 2014 by the BLOODHOUND SSC RBLI K'NEX Build Team in the UK with a 13.38-meter-long K'Nex replica of the Bloodhound SSC supersonic car.

K'Nex has a traveling exhibit, K'Nex: Build Thrill Rides, that visits schools and museums across the US.

== Licensed product lines ==
- Angry Birds
- Family Guy
- My Little Pony, under Tinkertoy (2017–2018)
- PAC-MAN and the Ghostly Adventures (2013–2014)
- Plants Vs Zombies franchise (2014–2018)
- Sesame Street
- Super Mario franchise including Super Mario and Mario Kart (2011–2018)
- WWE (2013–2018)

== Computer games ==
K'NEX The Lost Mines: Adventure Begins, was released in 1998 by EAI Interactive for Windows 95.

Virtual K'Nex was released in 1998 by Fox Interactive for Windows 3.x.

== See also ==
- K*bot World Championships
- Fischertechnik
- Meccano
- Free Universal Construction Kit – 3D-printable open source construction toy
