= Tinkertoy =

Children's construction set toy

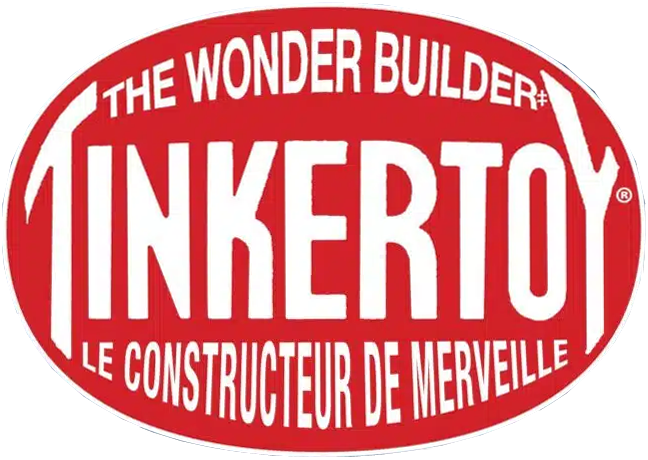
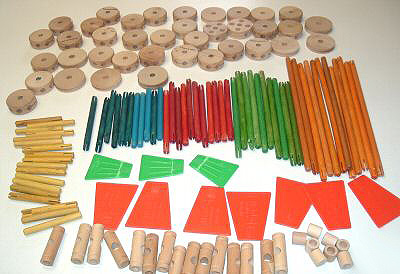
- Pieces from a Tinkertoy set
- Type: Construction set
- Invented by: Charles H. Pajeau
- Company: Hasbro (Note: Through Basic Fun! Inc., which manufactures and markets the products since 2018.)
- Country: United States
- Availability: 1914–present
- Materials: Wood
- Official website

The Tinkertoy Construction Set (commonly known as Tinkertoy, Tinker Toy, or plural forms thereof) is a construction set for children. It was designed in 1914 and was originally manufactured in Evanston, Illinois, U.S. The Tinkertoy brand is currently owned by BasicFun! Inc., which acquired it in 2018.

== History ==
The construction set was designed in 1914 –six years after Frank Hornby's Meccano sets– by Charles H. Pajeau, who formed the Toy Tinker Company in Evanston, Illinois, to manufacture them. Pajeau, a stonemason, designed the set after seeing children play with sticks and empty spools of thread. Pajeau partnered with Robert Pettit and Gordon Tinker to market a toy that would allow and inspire children to use their imaginations. After an initially slow start, over a million were sold.

The cornerstone of the set is a wooden spool roughly 1.4 inches (3.6 cm) in diameter, with holes drilled every 45 degrees around the perimeter and one through the center. Unlike the center, the perimeter holes do not go all the way through. With the differing-length sticks, the set was intended to be based on the Pythagorean progressive right triangle.

The sets were introduced to the public through displays in and around Chicago which included model Ferris wheels. Tinkertoys have been used to construct complex machines, including Danny Hillis's tic-tac-toe-playing computer (now in the collection of the Computer History Museum in Mountain View, California) and a robot at Cornell University in 1998.

One of Tinkertoy’s distinctive features is the toy’s packaging. Initially, the mailing tube design was chosen to reduce shipping costs. Early versions of the packaging included an address label on the tube with space for postage. To assist buyers in differentiating between the various offerings, sets were placed in mail tube packages of different sizes and also delineated with a number (e.g.: 116, 136) and a name (e.g.: major, prep, big boy, junior, grad). A colorful "how-to" instruction guide accompanied each set. In the 1950s, color was added and the wooden sticks appeared in red, green, blue, and peach.

The main manufacturing location was a 65,000-square-foot (6,000 m^{2}) four-story plant at 2012 Ridge Avenue, Evanston, Illinois.

Tinkertoys were inducted into the National Toy Hall of Fame at The Strong in Rochester, New York, in 1998.

Hasbro bought the Tinkertoy brand and produced both Tinkertoy Plastic and Tinkertoy Classic (wood) sets and parts. Hasbro later leased rights to BasicFun! to manufacture and market the toy.

The US rights are currently owned by Basic Fun! Inc., which acquired them in 2018. In 2024, Basic Fun! filed for Chapter 11 bankruptcy protection. The company will use bankruptcy proceedings to repay its creditors while remaining in operation.

== Standard parts ==
In addition to the spools, a standard Tinkertoy set includes:

- Wheels, which are thinner than spools, but larger in diameter. Like spools, their center holes have a snug fit.
- Caps, originally wooden, but later plastic, cylindrical pieces with a single blind axial hole snugly fitted to the rods.
- Couplings, small cylindrical pieces (originally wood; later plastic) approximately 1.35 inches (3.4 cm) long and slightly over 0.5 inches (1.3 cm) in diameter, with snug-fitting blind-drilled holes in either end, and a loose-fitting through-drilled hole crosswise through the center of the part.
- Pulleys, identical to spools, except that the center holes are loose-fitting.
- "Part W", approximately 1.8 inches (4.6 cm) in diameter with perimeter holes 90 degrees apart, loose-fitting center holes, and four tight-fitting through-drilled holes parallel to the center hole. This allows for free-spinning parts, and also for construction of "cage" or "lantern" gears.
- Short pointed sticks (originally wood, but later plastic), typically red, and flags ("fan blades"), typically green plastic, and various other small parts.

Spools and pulleys all have a single groove around the outside; "Part W" has two parallel grooves.

Sticks (or "rods") are slotted on each end, both to provide slight flexibility when inserted into snug-fitting holes, and to allow thin cards, flags, and strings to be inserted into the slots. They are color-coded by size; in the 1960s-era sets, they were, in order from shortest to longest, orange, peach, blue, red, green, and violet. Each successively longer rod is (with allowances for the size of the spools) the next smaller size times the square root of two; thus any two of the same size will combine with one of the next size up, and three spools, to form an isosceles right triangle (45°–45°–90°).

Tinkertoy sticks before 1992 were made with a diameter of 0.25 inches (0.64 cm). The earlier sets had natural wood sticks, but changed to colored sticks in the late 1950s. From measurement, the orange sticks are 1.25 inches (3.2 cm) inches long; peach, 2.15 inches (5.5 cm); blue, 3.35 inches (8.5 cm); red, 5.05 inches (12.8 cm); green, 7.40 inches (18.8 cm); and purple, 10.85 inches (27.6 cm). Spools are 1.35 inches (3.4 cm) inches in diameter with holes of 0.30 inches (0.76 cm) inch depth.

Most of the larger sets also include a driveshaft (an unfinished wooden rod without slotted ends, of an intermediate length between "green" and "violet", normally turned with a small plastic crank.

The Ultra Construction Set also includes connectors, small cylindrical plastic pieces approximately 2 inches (5.1 cm) long with a slot in either end and a slotted hole crosswise through the center of the part.

Sets with battery-powered electric motors were available; these sets also typically included at least one wooden "double pulley" with a single snug-fitting through-drilled center hole, and grooved rims at two diameters, allowing different moving parts to operate at different speeds.

== In popular culture ==
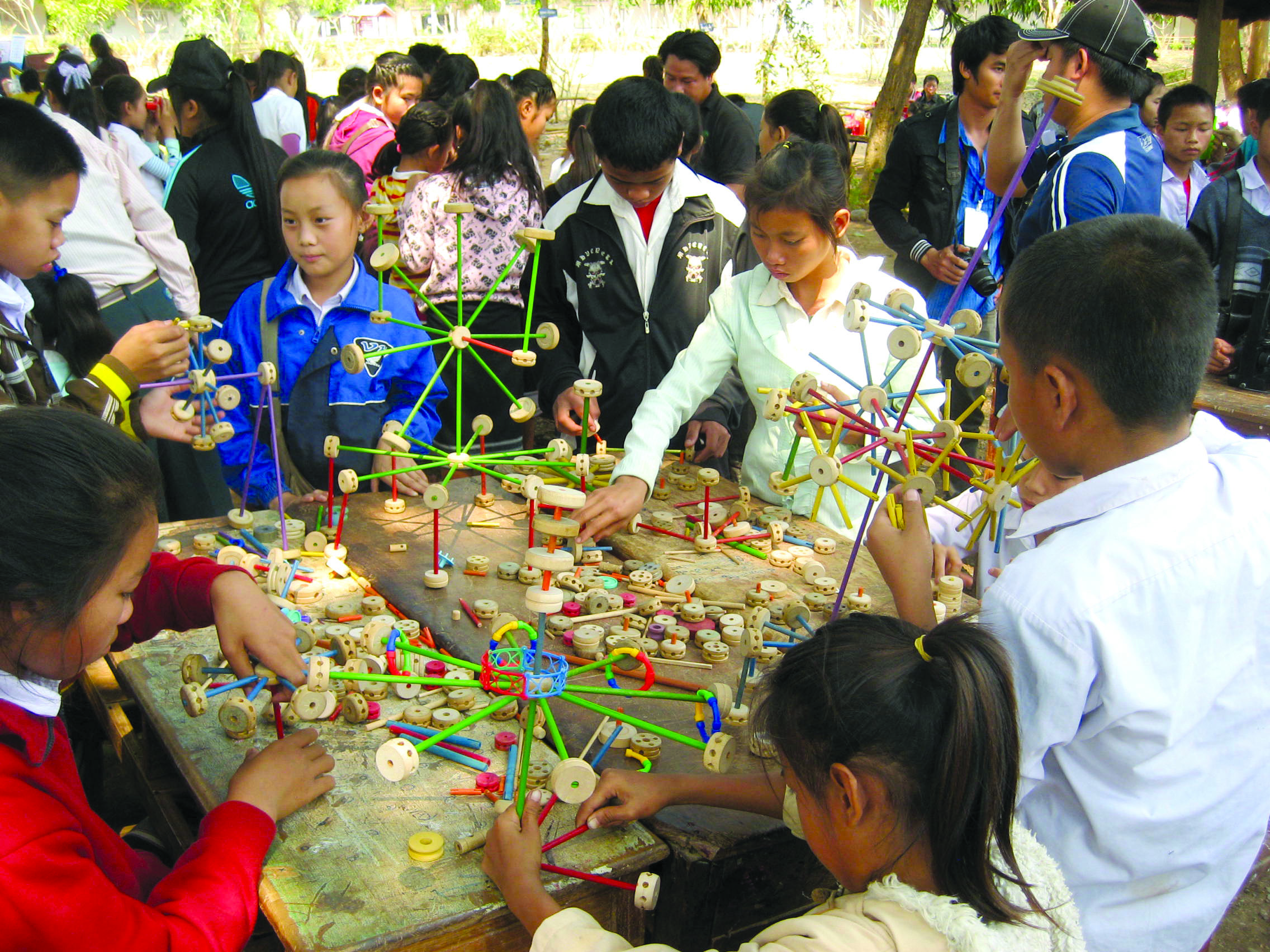
Children in Laos playing with Tinkertoy sets

Tinkertoys are present in the film Toy Story, seen scattered across Andy's room. The characters use these as dumbbells for exercise training.

In the second film, they are seen yet again scattered across Andy's room. However, these Tinkertoys are wood, not plastic like the first film. They are shown disorganized in the toy box with no container.

They are also seen in Toy Story 3, being used as the supports for the railroad in the Wild West scene at the beginning at the film. They are yet again wood, with their very last appearance in the Sunnyside Daycare.

== See also ==
- Construction set#Categories
- Fischertechnik
- K'Nex
- Lego
- Lincoln Logs
- Free Universal Construction Kit – 3D-printable open source construction toy

== Bibliography ==
- Dewdney, A. K. (1993). The Tinkertoy Computer and Other Machinations. New York: W. H. Freeman. ISBN 0-7167-2491-X. OCLC 27935794.
- Strange, Craig (1996). Collector's Guide to Tinker Toys. Paducah, KY: Collector Books. ISBN 0-89145-703-8. OCLC 34889091.
