= List of wooden toys =

A gee-haw whammy diddle in use

This is a list of wooden toys and games. A wooden toy is a toy constructed primarily from wood and wood products. Additional components made from other materials are also sometimes used.

== Wooden toys ==
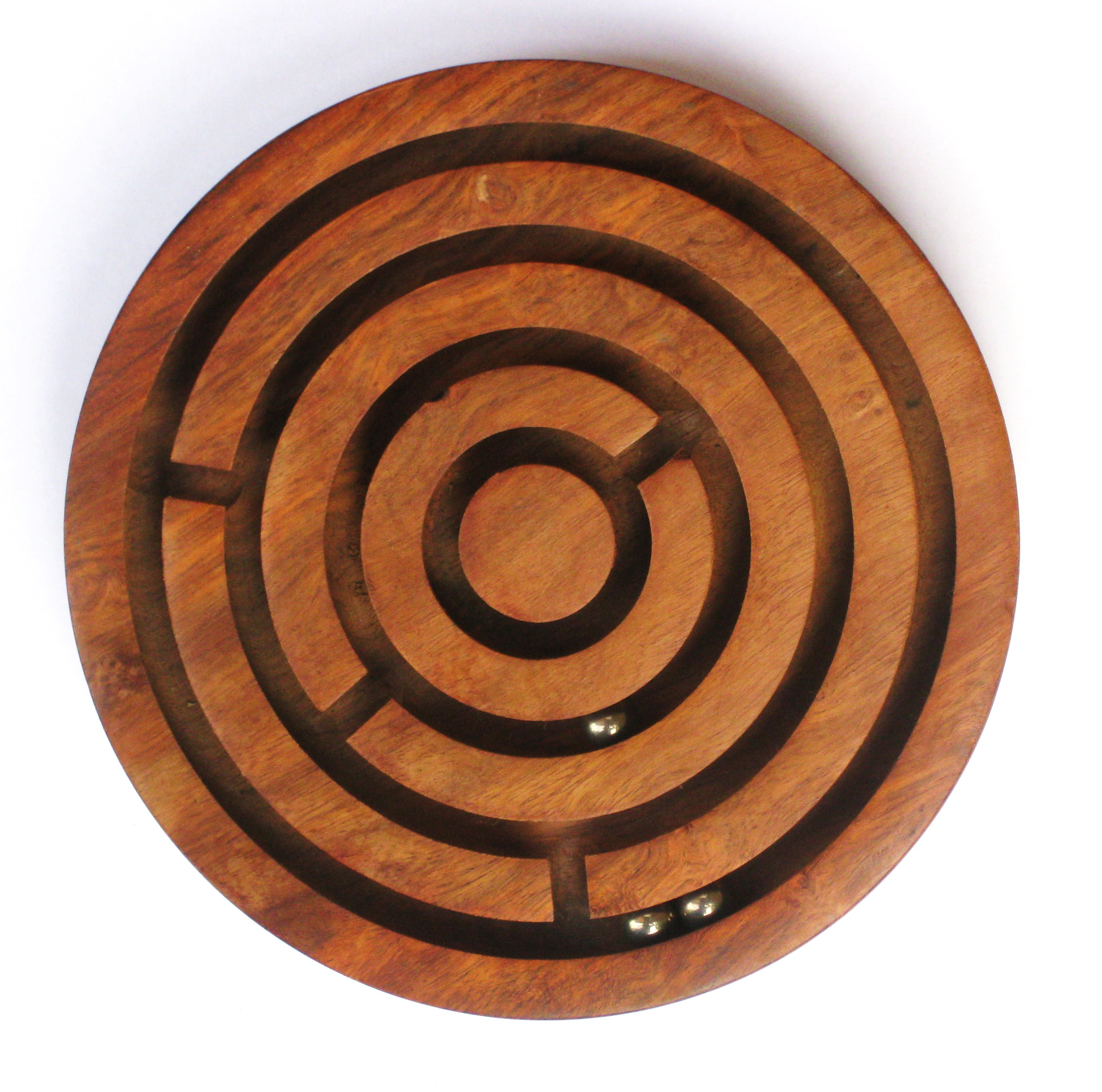
A ball-in-a-maze puzzle

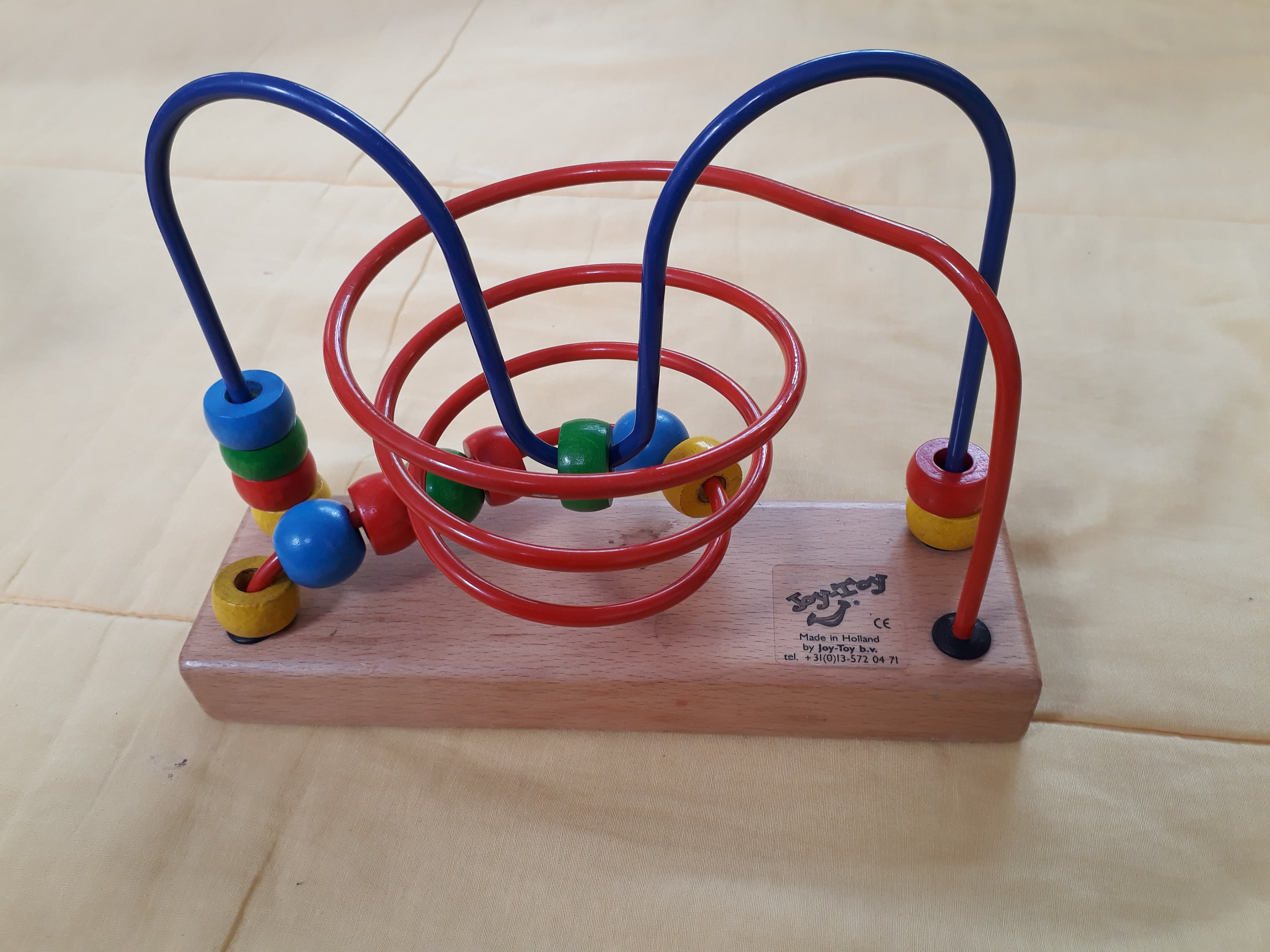
A bead maze

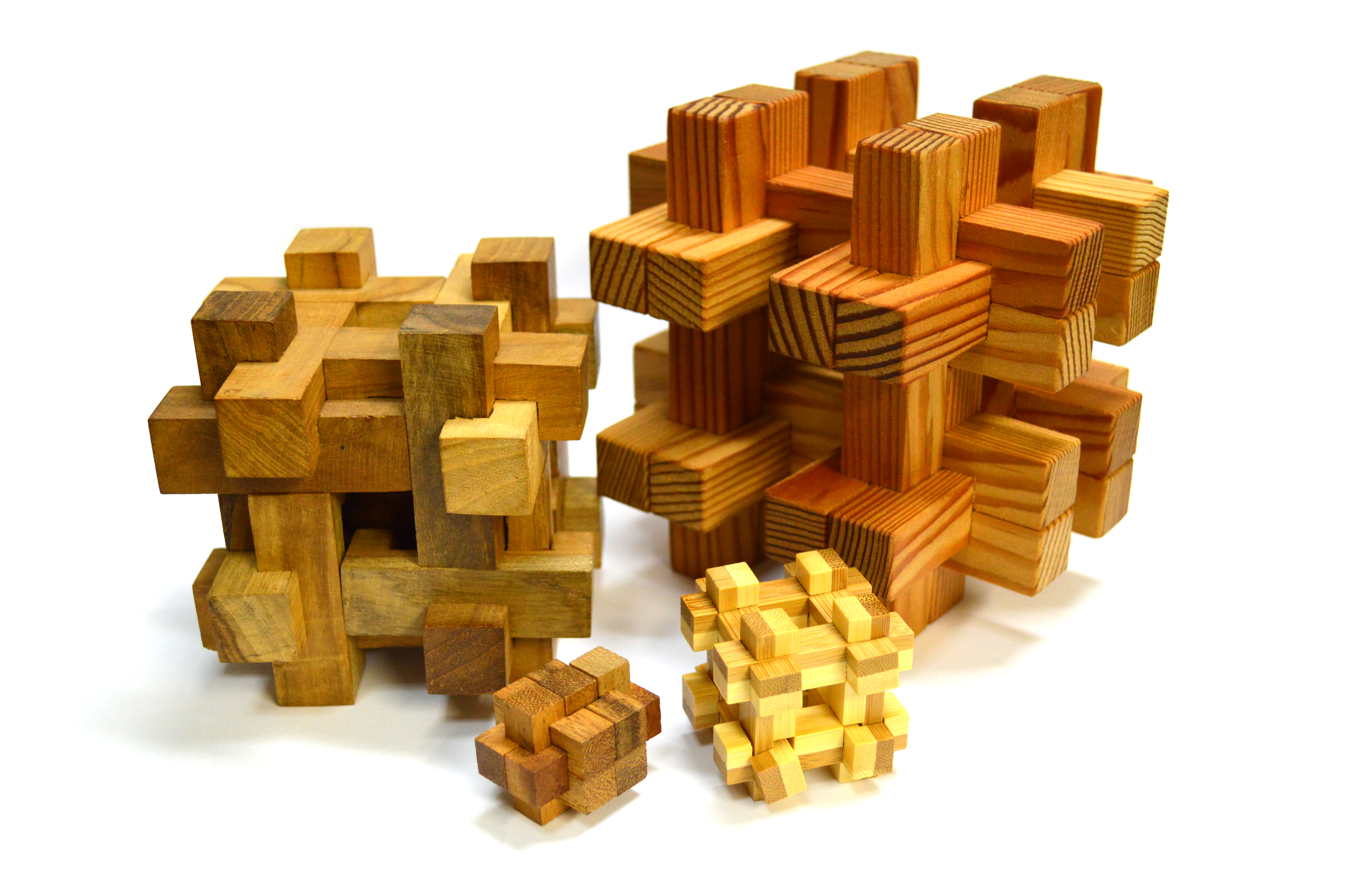
Burr puzzles

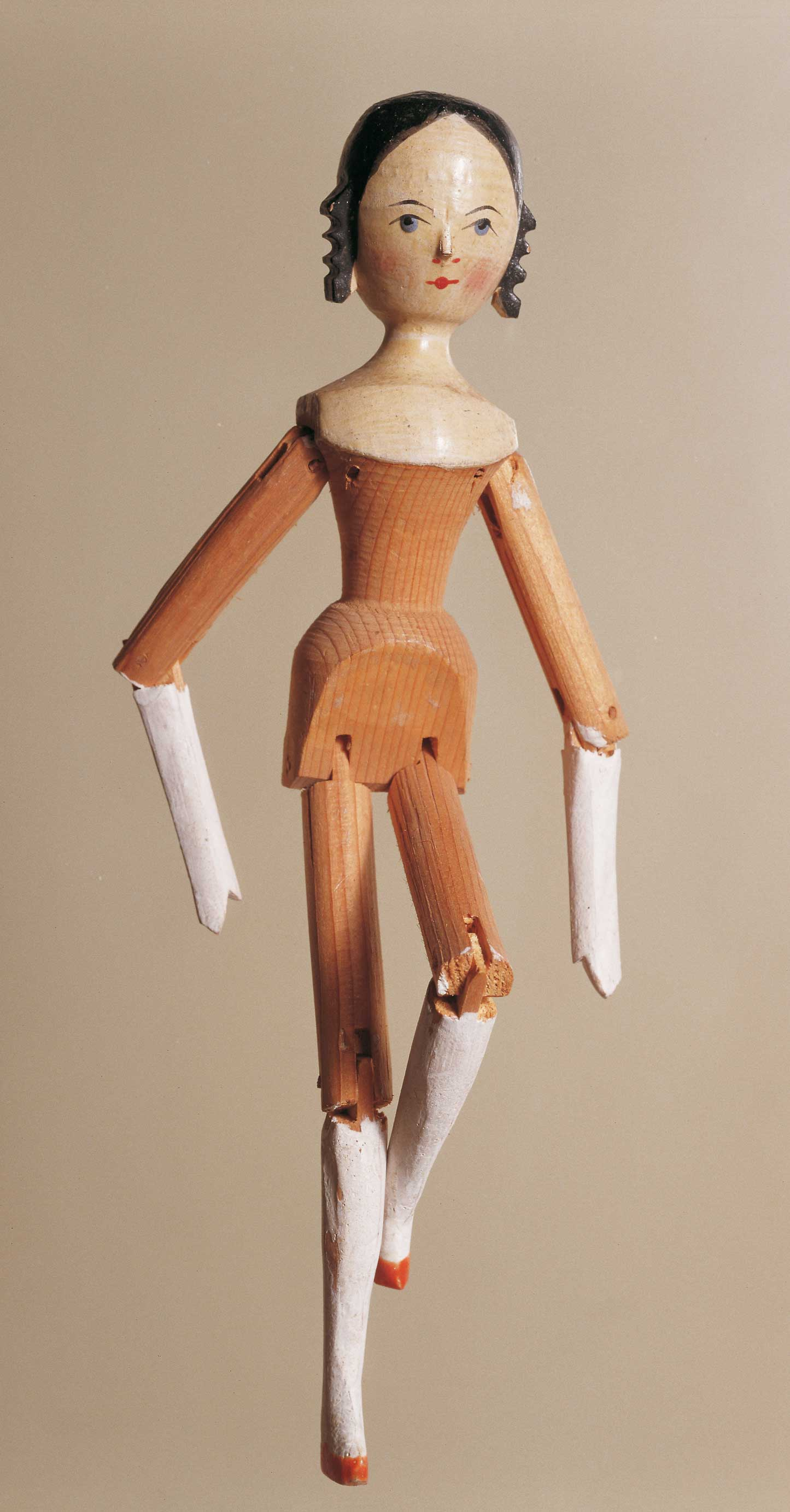
A peg wooden doll from Val Gardena, 1850

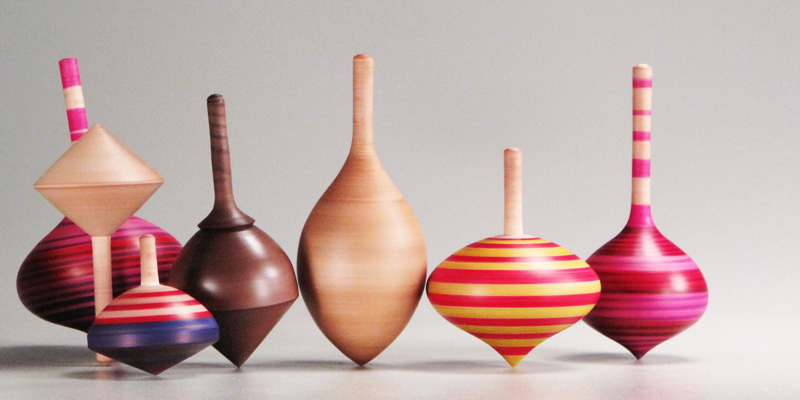
Various spinning tops

- Akabeko
- Ball-in-a-maze puzzle
- Bauernroulette
- Bead maze
- Bird of Happiness
- Burr puzzle
- Channapatna toys
- Chatter Telephone
- Chinese yo-yo
- Cup-and-ball
- Dalecarlian horse
- Dreidel
- Etikoppaka toys – traditional wooden toys with lacquer colours made in Etikoppaka, AP, India. Some of the toy styles include Lord Ganesha toys, cannon toys and bullock carts. They are prepared using poniki wood.
- Froebel gifts
- Gee-haw whammy diddle
- Hobby horse
- Hoop rolling
- Jacob's ladder
- Jig doll
- Jigsaw puzzle
- Jumping jack
- Kapla
- Kendama
- KEVA Planks
- Klotski
- Kondapalli Toys
- LaLaLull Australia
- Lincoln Logs
- Le Toy Van
- Matador
- Matryoshka doll
- Mechanical puzzle – some are constructed from wood and wood products
- Nirmal toys and craft
- Peg wooden doll
- Pinewood derby
- Puppets
- Pyramid puzzle
- Rattleback
- Reifendrehen
- Rocking horse
- Roly-poly toy
- Snapper Puzzle
- Soma cube
- Tender Leaf Toys
- Tinkertoy
- Top
- Toy block
- Trompo
- Unit block
- Whittle Shortline
- Wood car racing
- Wooden toy train
- Yo-yo – some yo-yos are made using wood
Wooden toys

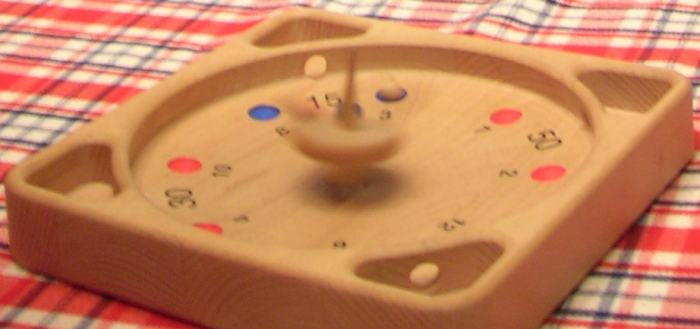
A bauernroulette game

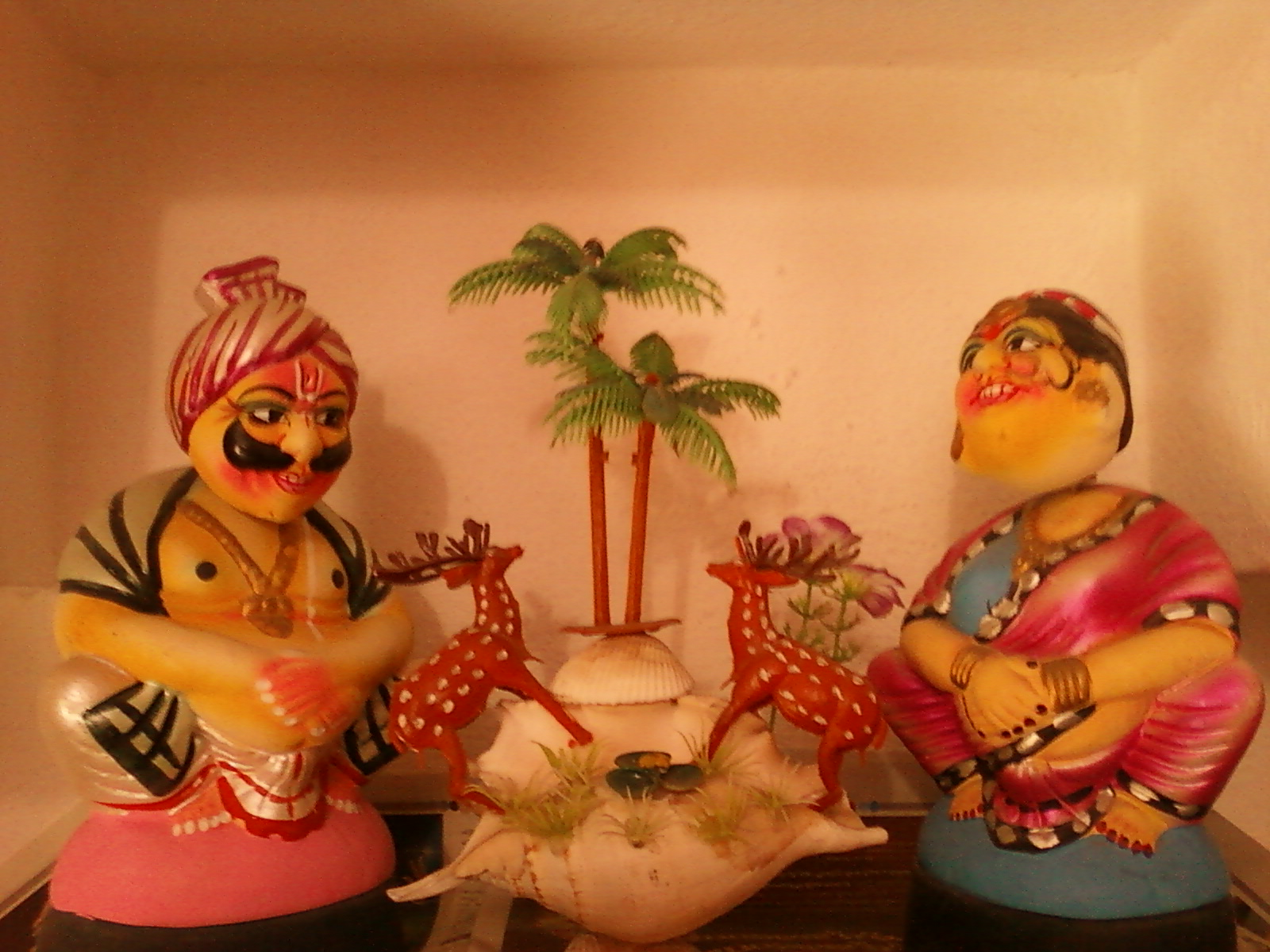
Kondapalli Toys

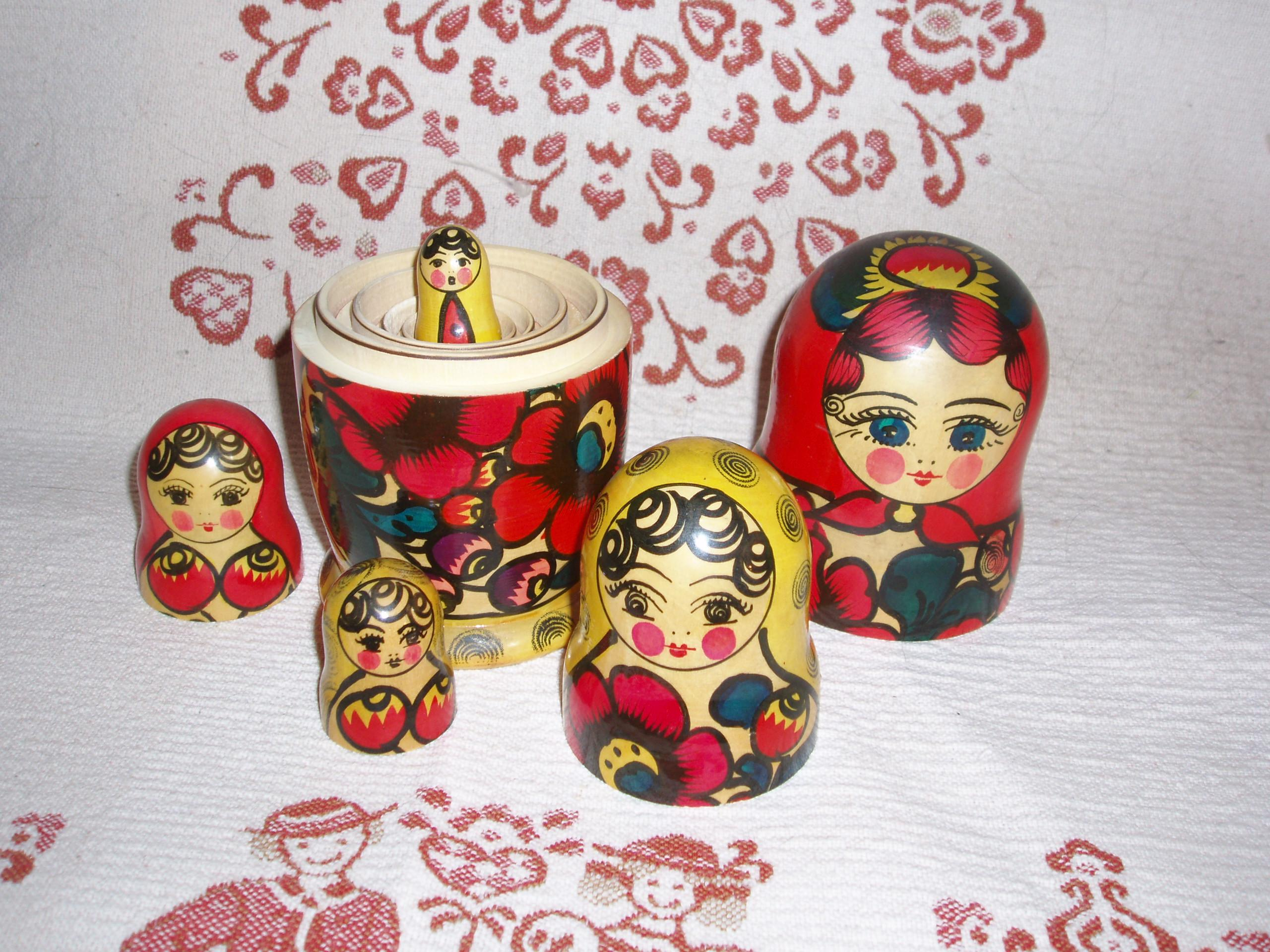
A matryoshka doll taken apart

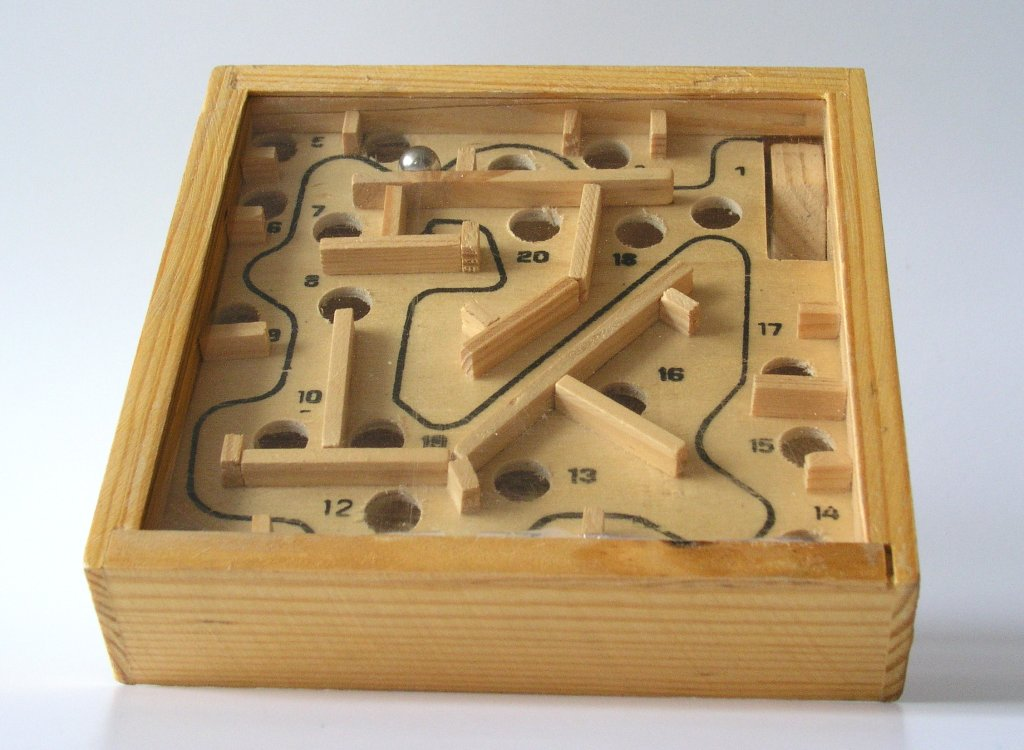
A puzzle of dexterity, a type of mechanical puzzle

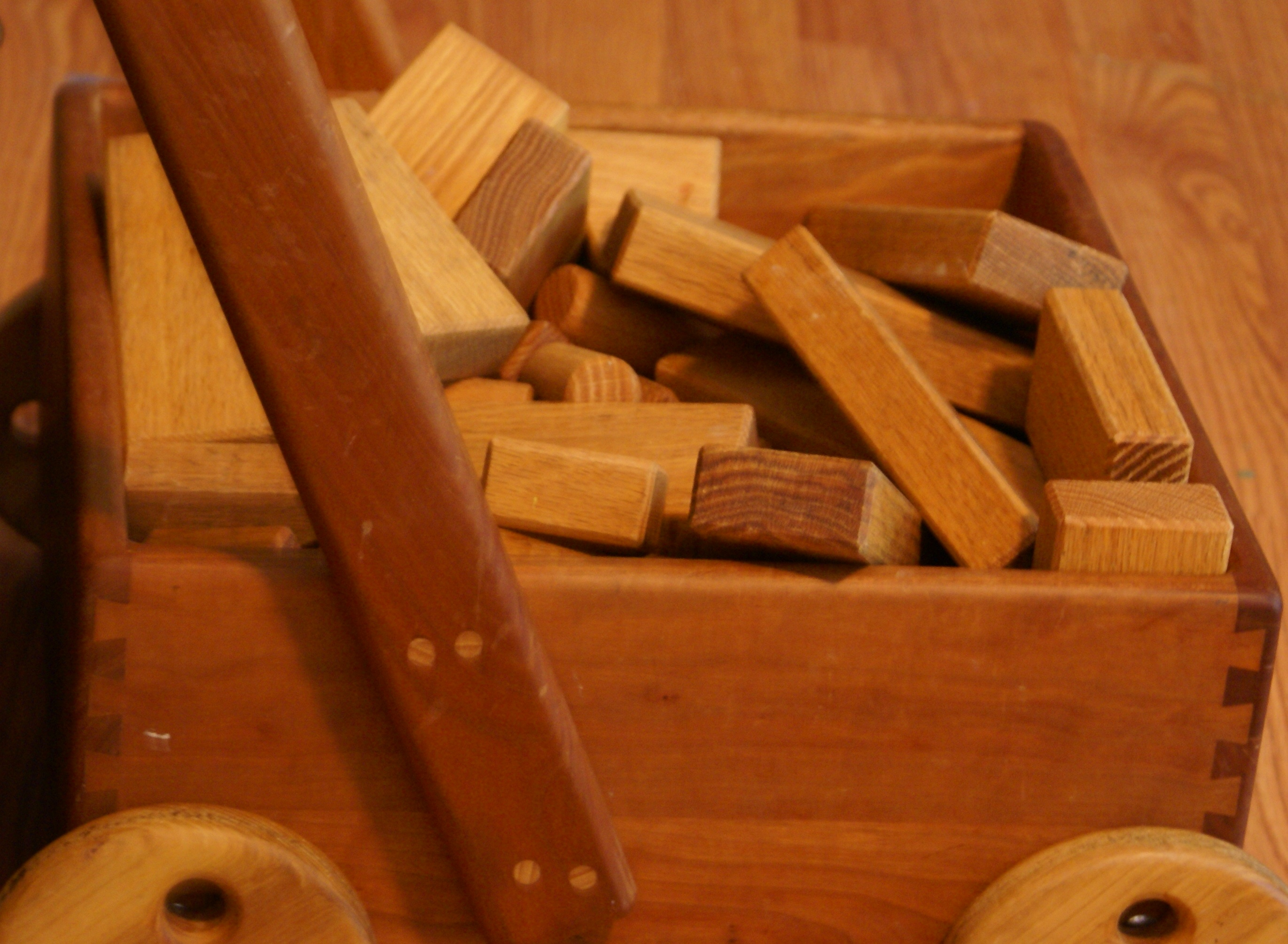
Wooden unit blocks, a type of toy block, in a wooden wagon

== Companies ==
- Dihras
- Faire Tyme Toys
- Folk Music Center
- Haba
- HEROS
- Holzgestaltung Lipkowski
- Kurt S. Adler
- Learning Curve International
- Maxim Enterprise
- Melissa & Doug
- One World Projects
- Plan Toys
- Schylling
- Smartframes
- TAG Toys
- US Art Supply

== See also ==
- List of toys
- Wooden toymaking in the Ore Mountains
