= Grimm's Spiel und Holz Design =

Grimm's Spiel und Holz Design is a toy manufacturer in Hochdorf, Southern Germany. Grimm's mainly produces wooden toys such as puzzles, building blocks, baby rattles and stackers, dollhouses and dollhouse furniture, stacking rainbows of many sizes, mobiles, decorative items, roll-along animals, and vehicles.

In 2013, Grimm's began producing their line of Waldorf dolls. These dolls are a natural progression of their product line, which is inspired by Waldorf education (in Europe, commonly referred to as Steiner education).

"Grimm's Spiel und Holz Design" (sometimes referred to as "Grimm's" or "Grimm's Spiel & Holz") was founded in 1978 and was called "Spiel und Holz Design". In 2006, the company came under new ownership, and had its name changed to "Grimm's Spiel und Holz Design".

The wood used for Grimm's production is sourced from sustainably managed forests in Europe and includes alder, lime, beech, and maple. The wood is cut into various shapes and is then coated with natural oil. If the product is colored, the wood is stained with certified non-toxic, water-based colors.

Grimm's products are available worldwide. They are sold in brick-and-mortar toy stores, as well as several online marketplaces including Amazon.
