= Montessori sensorial materials =

Educational aid

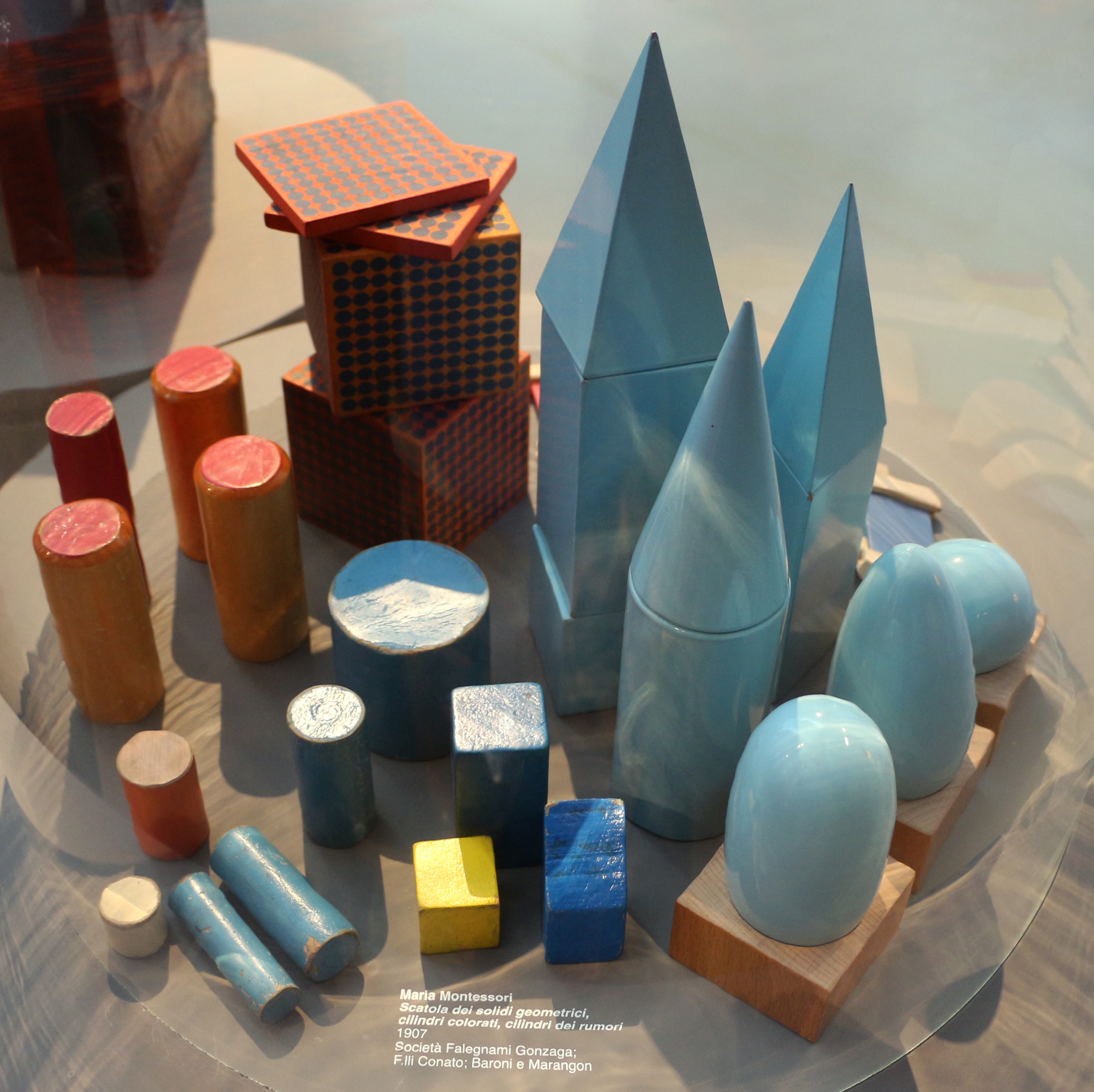
Some of Montessori's many manipulatives

Montessori sensorial materials are materials used in the Montessori classroom to help a child develop and refine their five senses. Use of these materials constitutes the next level of difficulty after those of practical life.

Like many other materials in the Montessori classroom, sensorial materials have what is called "control of error", meaning that the child not only works with the material, but has a way to check their work rather than seeking out the teacher if they have a question on whether or not they did it right. This is done to help promote independence and problem solving on the part of the child.

== Cylinder blocks ==
The cylinder blocks are ten wooden cylinders of various dimensions that can be removed from a fitted container block using a knobbed handle. To remove the cylinders, the child tends to naturally use the same three-finger grip used to hold pencils.

Several activities can be done with the cylinder blocks. The main activity involves removing the cylinders from the block and replacing them again in the spot that one got them from. The control of error is constituted in the child's inability to replace a cylinder in the wrong hole.

== Pink tower ==
The pink tower has ten pink cubes of different sizes, from 1 centimeter up to 10 cm in increments of 1 cm. The work is designed to provide the child with a concept of "big" and "small."

The child starts with the largest cube and puts the second-largest cube on top of it. This continues until all ten cubes are stacked on top of each other.

The control of error is visual. The child sees the cubes are in the wrong order and knows that they should fix them. The successive dimensions of each cube are such that if the cubes are stacked flush with a corner, the smallest cube may be fit squarely on the ledge of each level.

== Broad stair ==
The broad stair (also called Brown Stair) is designed to teach the concepts of "thick" and "thin". It comprises ten sets of wooden prisms with a natural or brown stain finish. Each stair is 20 cm in length and varies in thickness from 1 to 10 cm. When put together from thickest to thinnest, they make an even staircase.

As an extension, the broad stairs are often used with the pink tower to allow the child to make many designs.

The pink tower and the broad stair are shown here together in an extension activity.

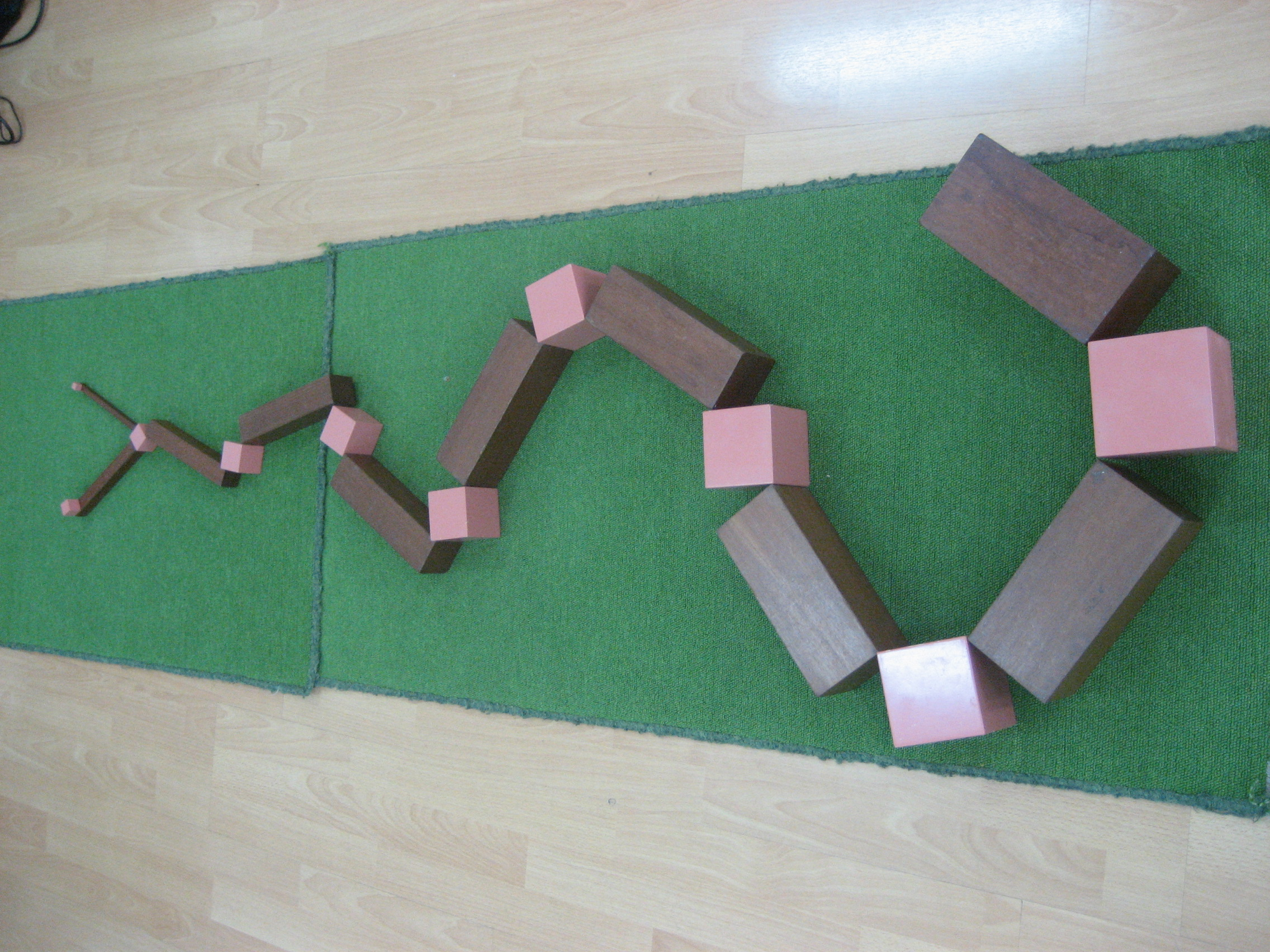
The child can make a variety of designs limited only by his or her imagination and the constraints of the material.

== Red rods ==
The red rods are rods with a square cross section, varying only in length. The smallest is 10 cm long and the largest is one meter long. Each rod is 2.5 cm/1inch square. By holding the ends of the rods with two hands, the material is designed to give the child a sense of long and short.

== Colored cylinders ==
Also called the knobless cylinders, the colored cylinders are exactly the same dimensions as the cylinder blocks mentioned above.

There are 4 boxes of cylinders:

- Yellow cylinders that vary in height and width. The shortest cylinder is the thinnest and the tallest cylinder is the thickest.
- Red cylinders that are the same height, but vary in width.
- Blue cylinders that have the same width, but vary in height.
- Green cylinders that vary in height and width. The shortest cylinder is the thickest and the tallest cylinder is the thinnest.

The child can do a variety of exercises with these materials, including matching them with the cylinder blocks, stacking them on top of each other to form a tower, and arranging them in size or different patterns. When the yellow, red, and green cylinders are placed on top of each other, they all are the same height.

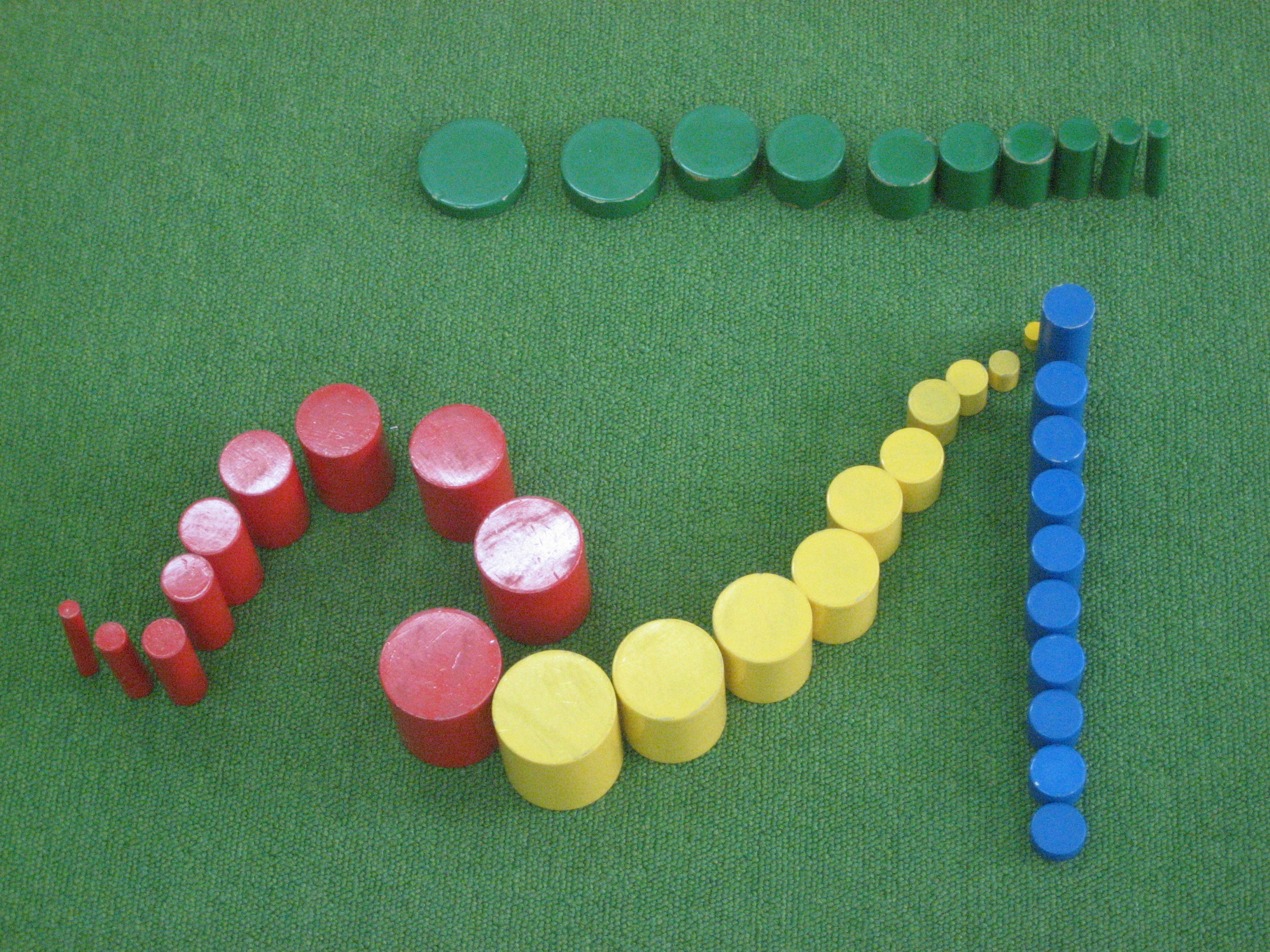
Colored Cylinders laid out in a design.

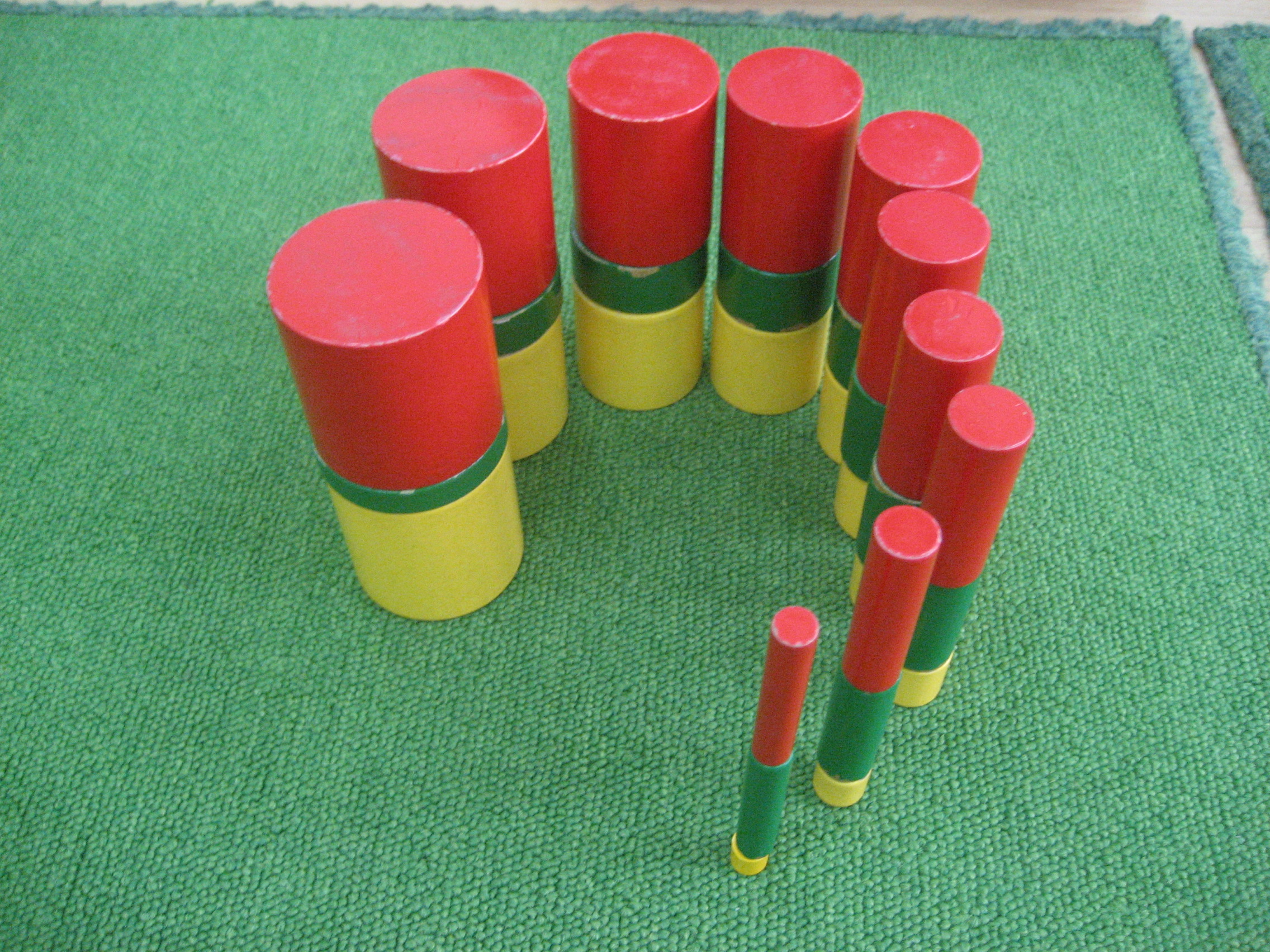
The green, yellow, and red cylinders are stacked on top of each other.

Here, the knobless cylinders are used with the cylinders from the cylinder block.

== Binomial cube ==
The binomial cube is a cube that has the following pieces: one red cube, three black and red prisms, three black and blue prisms, and one blue cube.

A box with eight prisms represent the elements of $(a+b)^3$ or: $a^3 + 3a^2b + 3ab^2 + b^3$

The pieces are stored in a box with two hinged opening sides. The color pattern of the cube is painted all around the outside of the box (except the bottom).

The material is not designed for math education until the elementary years of Montessori education. In the primary levels (ages 3-6), it is used as sensorial material. It is an indirect preparation for mathematics, especially for the cube root.

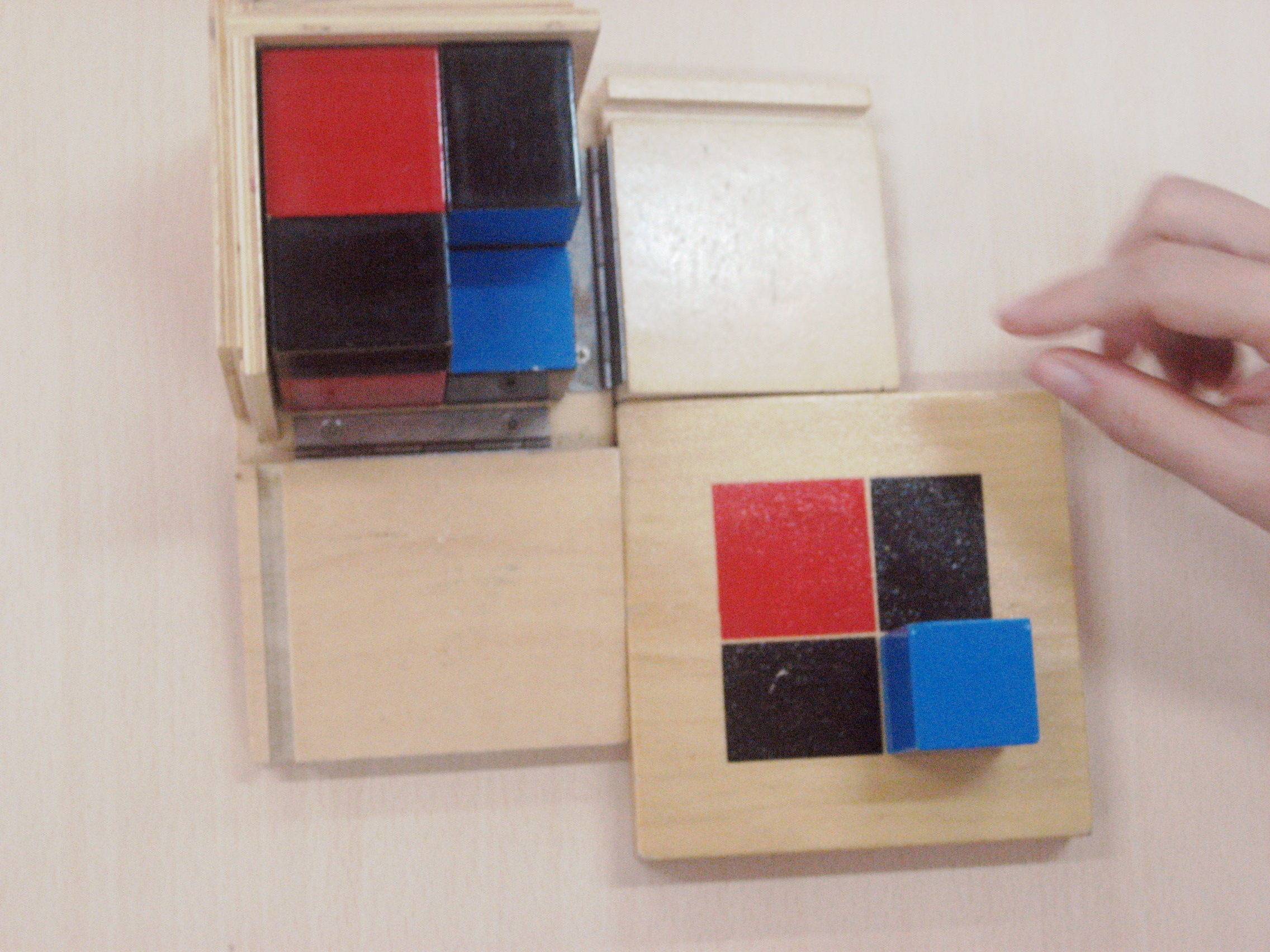
The Binomial Cube

== Trinomial cube ==
The trinomial cube is similar to the binomial cube, but has the following pieces instead:

- 1 red cube and 6 black and red prisms (varying in size)
- 1 blue cube and 6 black and blue prisms (varying in size)
- 1 yellow cube and 6 black and yellow prisms (varying in size)
- 6 black prisms (same size)

This is similar to the binomial cube, but is a physical representation of this formula:

$(a+b+c)^3 = a^3 + 3a^2b + 3a^2c + b^3 + 3ab^2 + 3b^2c + c^3 + 3ac^2 + 3bc^2 + 6abc$

== Other materials ==
There are many Montessori sensorial materials, and more are being investigated and developed by teachers around the world. Other popular Montessori sensorial materials include:

Monomial cube
A cube similar to the binomial and trinomial cube. The child has a sensorial experience of the power of multiplying by two and developing that into a cube.
Geometric cabinet
Several different shapes are inset into the wood and placed in drawers. The child distinguishes the different shapes, learns their names, and learns how to discriminate from the shapes.
The constructive triangles
Different triangles are put together to form various shapes. Shapes made with the triangles include the parallelogram, hexagon, rhombus, and trapezoid.
Color tablets
Boxes with tablets inside. The sides are usually made of wood or plastic. The middle is painted wood or plastic. The only difference between them is the colors in the middle. There are three color boxes. The first has the three primary colors (red, blue, and yellow). The second has 12 different colors. The third box has nine colors, but in different grades from light to dark.
Geometric solids
Ten Geometric three-dimensional shapes made from wood and usually painted blue. The shapes are:
- Sphere
- Cone
- Ovoid
- Ellipsoid
- Triangle-based pyramid
- Square-based pyramid
- Cube
- Cylinder
- Rectangular prism
- Triangular prism
The mystery bag
The mystery bag contains various object that the child feels and sorts without looking into the bag. The object is removed after the child has decided how to sort it and a visual check is done. (Though this may also be done blindfolded to add to the experience).
Rough and smooth boards
Sandpaper is glued onto a smooth wood board. Various grading of sandpaper are used later as an extension of this activity to help the child discriminate between them.
Fabric box
Different fabric materials are used that the child must feel and match. A blindfold is usually used so the child cannot see the materials.
Thermic bottles
Water of different temperatures is added to metal bottles. The child lines them up from hottest to coldest.
Baric tablets
Wooden tablets of various weight to help the child discriminate between weight.
Sound cylinders
Two boxes, each containing six cylinders. One set has a red top and the other a blue top. When shaken, each cylinder of the same color gives off a different sound. The sound from the red cylinder is matched with the same exact sound from the blue cylinder.
Bells
Twenty-six bells are used to help develop a sense of musical tones.

The Color Tablets: Box 3

The Geometric Solids

The Montessori Bells

== See also ==
- Base ten block
- Froebel Gifts
- Unit block
- Alphabet Nursery Blocks (ABC-Blocks)
