= KEVA Planks =

Wooden block toy

A single KEVA Plank

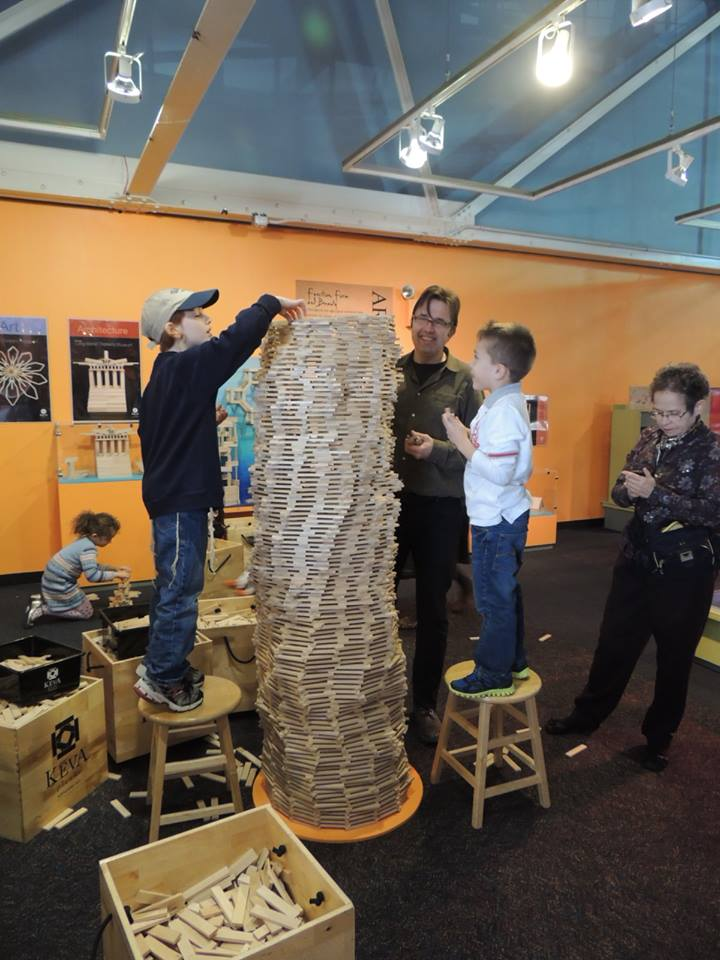
A tower made from KEVA Planks

KEVA Planks are cuboid wooden block toys. Each block is sized 5/16 by 7/8 by 4 5/8 inches (7.9 mm × 22.2 mm × 117.5 mm). The blocks are available for sale in maple, that is produced in the United States, and less expensive imported pine versions.

Originating as a straightforward construction set, KEVA Planks are distinct in their design: they consist of a single shape without any connectors or glue, unlike many other building sets that rely on specific instructions and sorting. Over time, KEVA Planks have evolved into an educational tool widely employed in classrooms.

A number of museums have KEVA exhibits for hands on experience with design and construction including:

- Da Vinci Science Center of Allentown, PA
- Exploration Place of The Sedgwick County Science and Discovery Center of Wichita, Kansas
- Fleet Science Center in San Diego, CA
- Kalamazoo Air Zoo of Kalamazoo, MI
- Lawrence Hall of Science at University of California, Berkeley, CA
- Rochester Museum and Science Center in Rochester, NY
- Science World (Vancouver) in Vancouver, BC
- Kaleideum of Winston-Salem, NC
- Discovery Park of America in Union City, TN

The tallest tower built with KEVA planks was 51 feet, 8 inches constructed at the National Building Museum in 2006.

KEVA planks is a privately owned company located in Virginia. Mindware, a division of Oriental Trading subsidiary of Berkshire Hathaway, is the exclusive licensee of many KEVA Planks products.

== In education ==
KEVA Planks are used in schools, libraries, museums, and maker spaces. They are a teaching tool that can be used as a manipulative to teach subjects including math, science, geography, history, and humanities. They were featured at Destination Imagination Global Finals in Knoxville, Tennessee in 2011.

Beginning in 2015, KEVA Planks traveled with Share Fair Nation STEMosphere events and was one of the most popular sessions in the professional development workshops. STEMosphere highlights innovative and creative teaching tools.

KEVA Planks were named number 3 in Worlds of Learning's Top Ten Makerspace Favorites of 2016.

They have been used as "de-stressors" at libraries at Duke University and the University of Virginia.

== See also ==
- Kapla
