= Toy block =

Part of a construction set

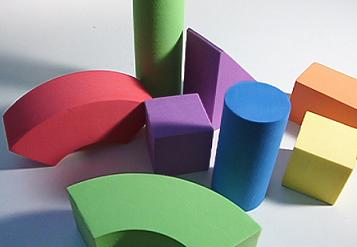
A set of blocks

Toy blocks, also called building bricks, building blocks, or simply blocks, are wooden, plastic, or foam pieces of various shapes (cube, cylinder, arch etc.) and colors that are used as construction toys. Sometimes, toy blocks depict letters of the alphabet.

== History ==
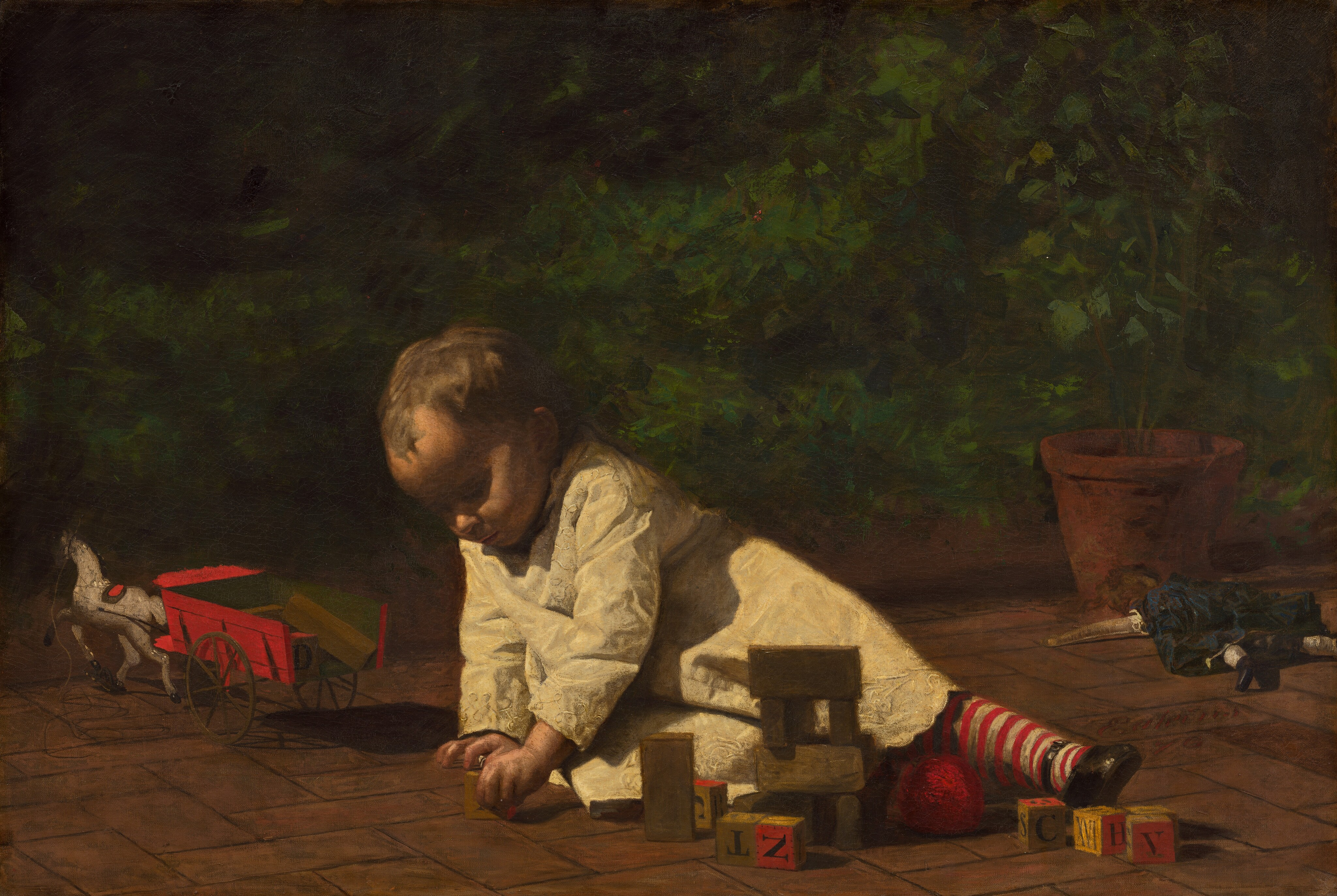
Baby at Play, by Thomas Eakins, 1876.

There are mentions of blocks or "dice" with letters inscribed on them used as entertaining educational tools in the works of English writer and inventor Hugh Plat (his 1594 book The Jewel House of Art and Nature) and English philosopher John Locke (his 1693 essay Thoughts Concerning Education). Plat described them as "the child using to play much with them, and being always told what letter chanceth, will soon gain his Alphabet" and Locke noted "Thus Children may be cozen’d into a Knowledge of the Letters; be taught to read, without perceiving it to be anything but a Sport".

University of Pennsylvania professor of Urbanism Witold Rybczynski has found that the earliest mention of building bricks for children appears in Maria and R.L. Edgeworth's Practical Education (1798). Called "rational toys", blocks were intended to teach children about gravity and physics, as well as spatial relationships that allow them to see how many different parts become a whole. In 1837 Friedrich Fröbel invented a preschool educational institution Kindergarten. For that, he designed ten Froebel Gifts based on building blocks principles. During the mid-nineteenth century, Henry Cole (under the pseudonym of Felix Summerly) wrote a series of children’s books. Cole's A book of stories from The Home Treasury included a box of terracotta toy blocks and, in the accompanying pamphlet "Architectural Pastime", actual blueprints.

In 2003 the National Toy Hall of Fame at The Strong museum in Rochester, New York inducted ABC blocks into their collection, granting it the title of one of America's toys of national significance.

== Educational benefits ==
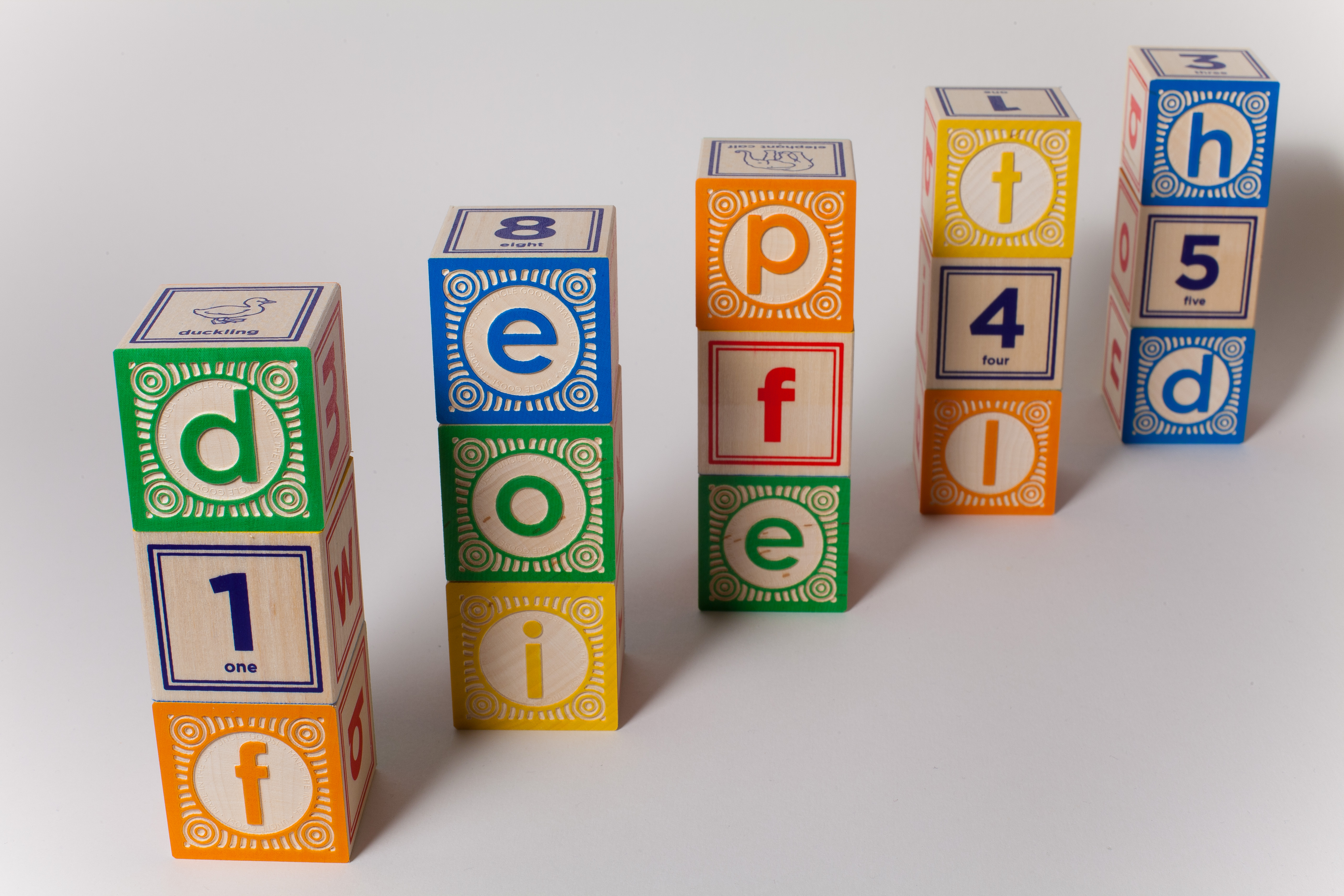
Blocks with numbers, letters and pictures

- Physical benefits: toy blocks build strength in a child's fingers and hands, and improve eye-hand coordination. They also help educate children in different shapes.
- Social benefits: block play encourages children to make friends and cooperate, and is often one of the first experiences a child has playing with others. Blocks are a benefit for the children because they encourage interaction and imagination. Creativity can be a combined action that is important for social play.
- Intellectual benefits: children can potentially develop their vocabularies as they learn to describe sizes, shapes, and positions. Math skills are developed through the process of grouping, adding, and subtracting, particularly with standardized blocks, such as unit blocks. Experiences with gravity, balance, and geometry learned from toy blocks also provide intellectual stimulation.
- Creative benefits: children receive creative stimulation by making their own designs with blocks.
- Language skills: When children engage in regular block play, they will develop better language skills.

== Types and manufacturers ==
=== No connectors ===
- Unit block is a popular standardized wooden toy block.
- Anchor Stone Blocks is a stone block construction toy.
- Kapla is a wooden block construction toy.
- KEVA Planks is a wooden block construction toy.
- Froebel gifts are a range of educational materials first used in the original Kindergarten.
- Montessori sensorial materials are a range of educational materials including wooden blocks.
- Pattern blocks and Cuisenaire rods are sets of small blocks used in mathematics education and also in block play.

=== Interlocking notches ===
- Lincoln Logs is a toy consisting of notched miniature logs.
- Stickle Bricks is a plastic construction toy primarily intended for toddlers.

=== Interlocking studded bricks ===
- Kiddicraft Self-Locking Building Bricks were marketed in the 1940s and 1950s.
- Lego is an interlocking plastic building brick toy line based on the Kiddicraft bricks above.
- Lego clones imitate Lego brand bricks.
- Rasti is an Argentine toy interlocking brick.
- Tente is a Spanish toy interlocking brick.
- EverBlock Systems is an American brand of oversized blocks.
