= Bead maze =

Children's toy

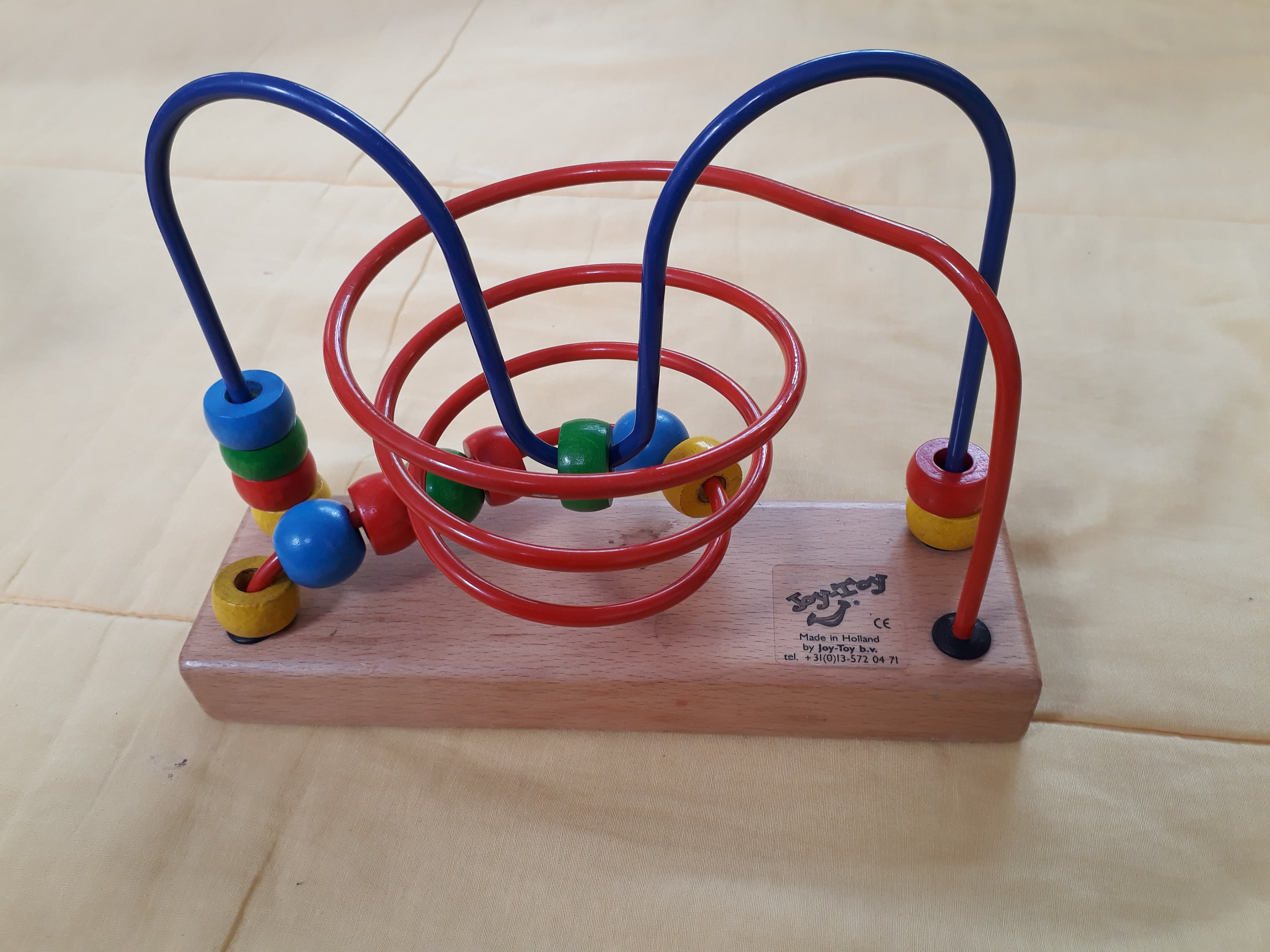
Bead maze

A bead maze or bead roller coaster is a children's toy. Bead mazes feature a wooden base with brightly-colored rigid wires strung from one side of the base to the other, often in intricate tracks that loop and intertwine with one another. Large wooden beads, often themselves brightly colored and sometimes having differing shapes, are strung along these wires, allowing the child to move the beads along the tracks from one side to the other.

Designed for children aged 18 months to 5 years, bead mazes are purported to encourage eye-hand coordination, spatial memory, and color and shape recognition through manipulation of the beads in three-dimensional space. They are a common fixture in waiting rooms of doctors' offices to keep children entertained while waiting to be seen.

== History ==
Bead mazes were introduced to the North American market in 1982 by Anatex Enterprises and in 1983 by Educo International, whose original designs featured five wires. Educo discovered and licensed the invention from Australian educator George Valentine, a school principal who originally developed the toy for special needs children. Anatex marketed bead mazes to pediatricians and teachers for use in doctors' offices and classrooms, and promoted them through the American Academy of Pediatrics.

== Materials ==
A typical bead maze contains a wooden base with metal wires travelling in loops. Some bead mazes contain multiple wires with beads on each wire. The beads are normally made of wood to minimise friction.

== Accolades ==
The original bead maze designs have been recognized over the years since they were first introduced.

- Anatex Rollercoaster
  - 1991 Parents' Choice Award: Toys
  - 1999 Dr. Toy Best Classic Toys
  - 2003 Parents' Choice "Best 25 Toys of 25 Years"
- Educo Super Maze
  - 1994 Parenting Magazine Toy Hall of Fame
  - 1999 Dr. Toy Best Classic Toys
