= Waldorf doll =

Type of doll used in Waldorf education

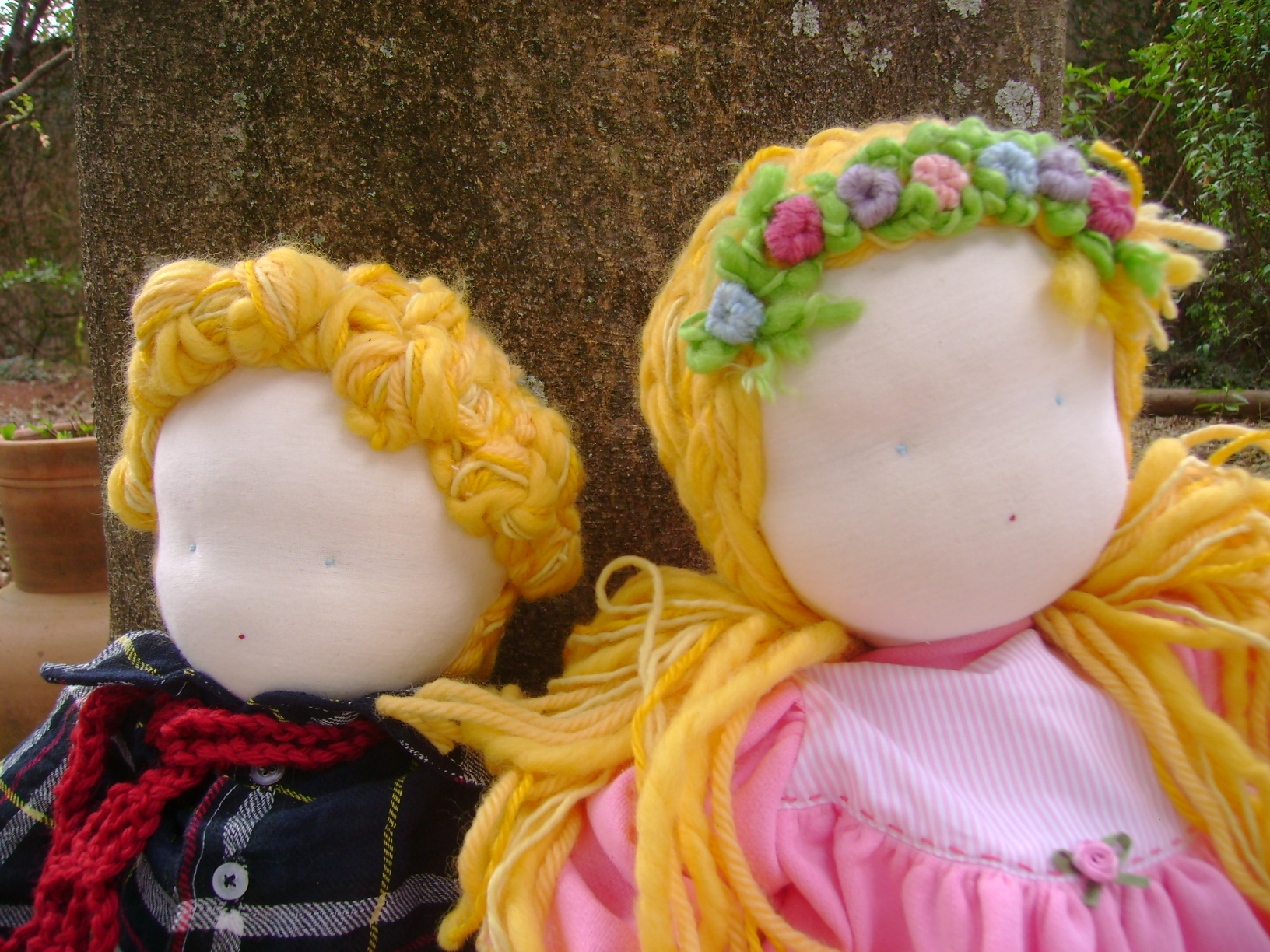
Waldorf dolls

A Waldorf doll (also called a Steiner doll) is a soft cloth doll associated with Waldorf education. It typically has a flexible stuffed body and a simple, neutral face intended to invite imaginative play.

== Design and materials ==
Traditional construction uses sheep’s wool for stuffing and cotton knit for the outer “skin.” Heads are formed and tied before being covered, and hair is attached with sewn or crocheted yarn, often mohair or bouclé. Facial features are minimal—usually a few stitched details—so the doll may be “read” in different moods during play. Soft, stuffed limbs allow natural cradling and sitting postures.

== Developmental variants ==
Guides used in kindergartens describe stage-appropriate forms: simple blanket or handkerchief dolls for infants; knotted comforters for teething; sturdier, simply clothed dolls for toddlers; and, for older children, formed-limb dolls that sit and can be dressed, sometimes with longer yarn hair for grooming play.

== Construction and making ==
Parents and teachers often make dolls in community craft groups drawing on European cloth-doll techniques. Typical steps include preparing and stuffing wool, shaping and tying the head, covering with cotton knit, stitching simple features, attaching a yarn wig, and sewing a small wardrobe. Hand-sewn seams are easy to mend, which proponents value for longevity in daily use.

== Educational context ==
Within the aims of Waldorf pedagogy—imitation, rhythm, and open-ended materials—the feature-light doll is used for self-directed, imaginative play rather than scripted character play.

== See also ==
- Froebel gifts
- Waldorf education
