= Matador (toy) =

Wooden construction toy

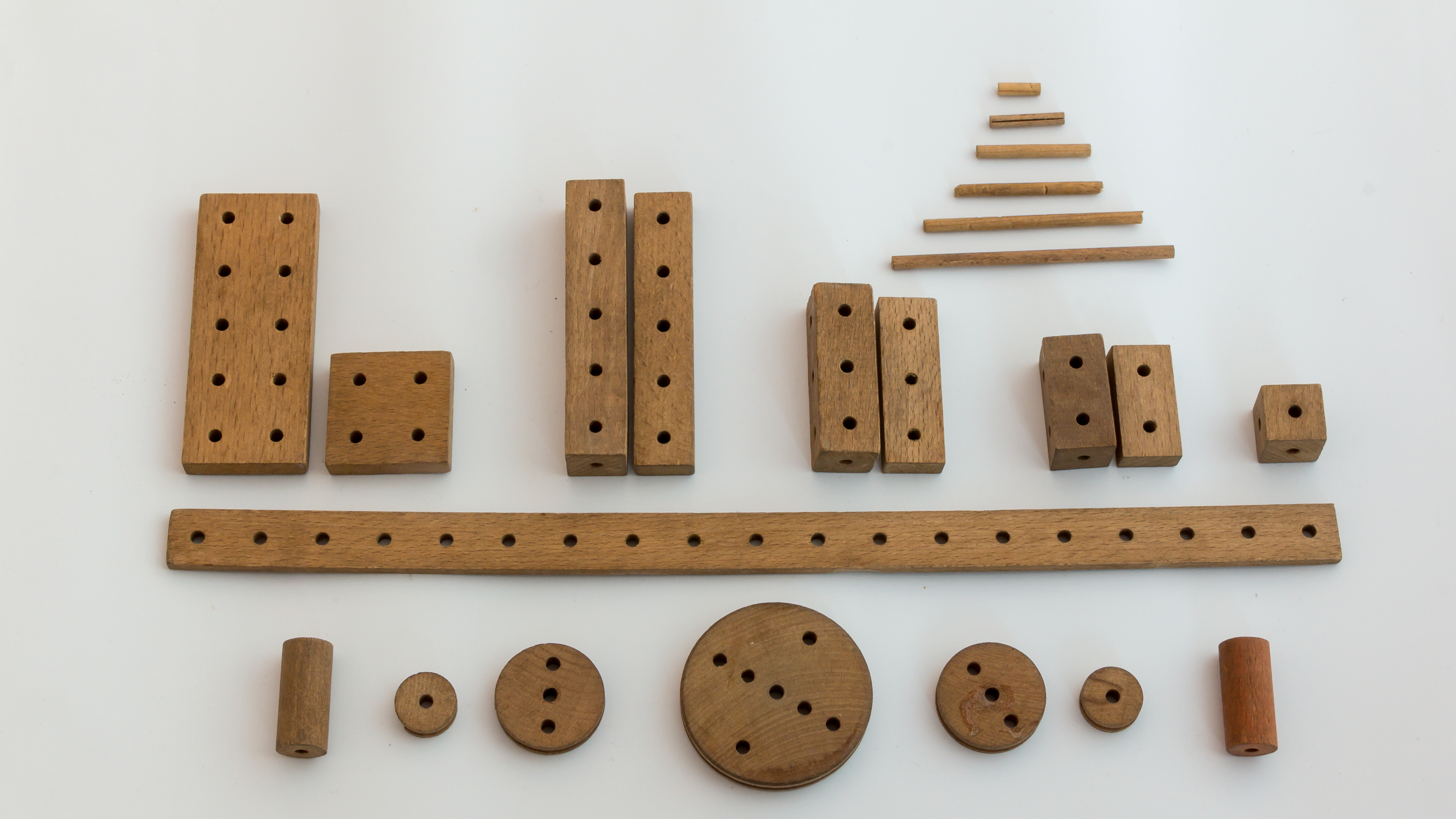
Matador building parts, ca. 1954; from the top: Various sticks; 10- and 4-board, 5-, 3-, 2-brick and slat, 1-brick; 19-bar; wheels and rolls

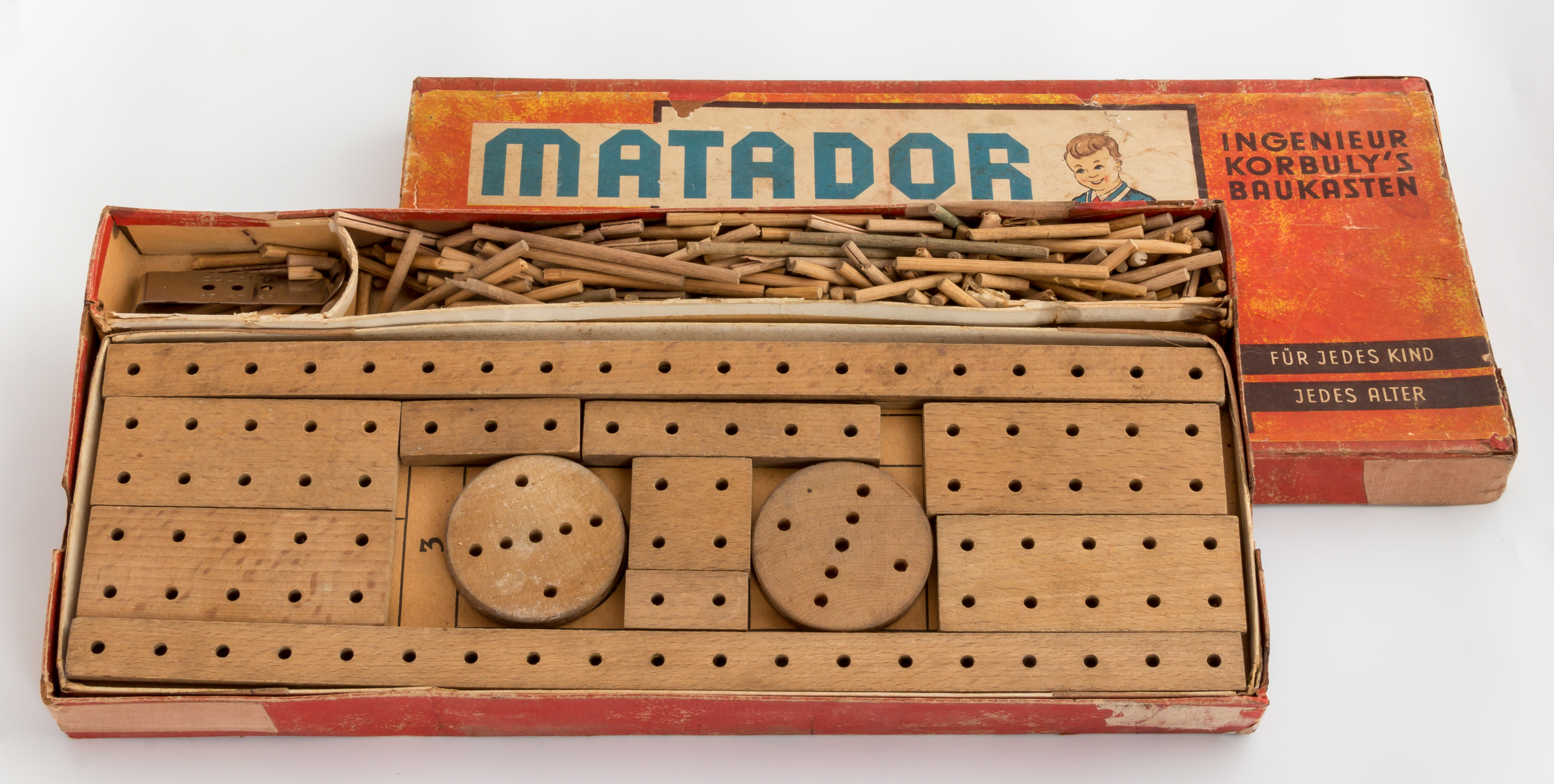
Matador construction kit, ca. 1954

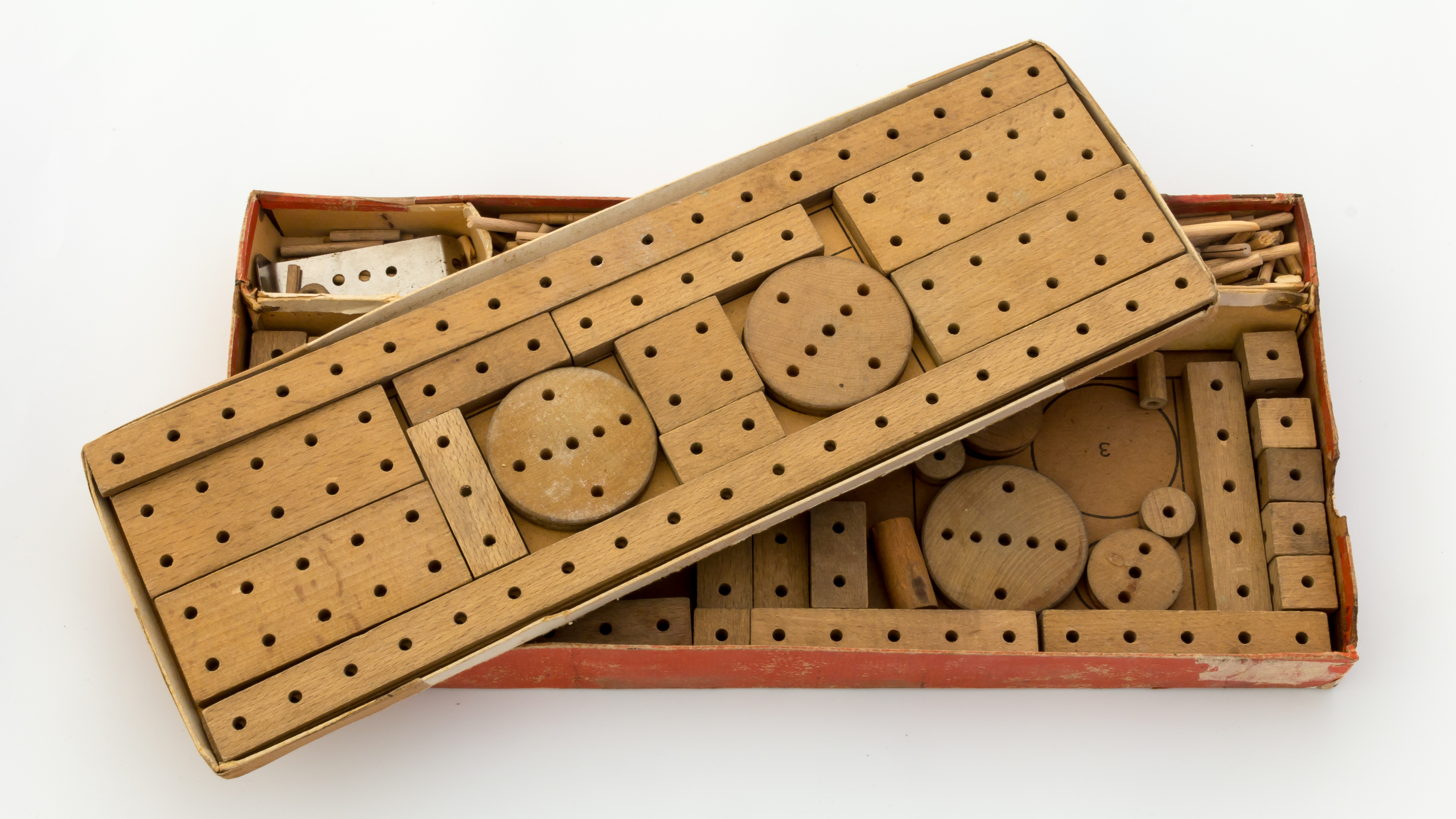
The same kit; top left, the special tool to extract sticks from blocks

Matador is a wooden toy set. The bricks are held together using special wooden sticks.

The blocks are precision cut to a single size and shape and are held together with sticks, which assists in the stability of larger constructions. The standard distance between brick holes is 20mm. The blocks are not varnished or treated.

The set has been invented by the Austrian engineer Johann Korbuly.
