= Unit block =

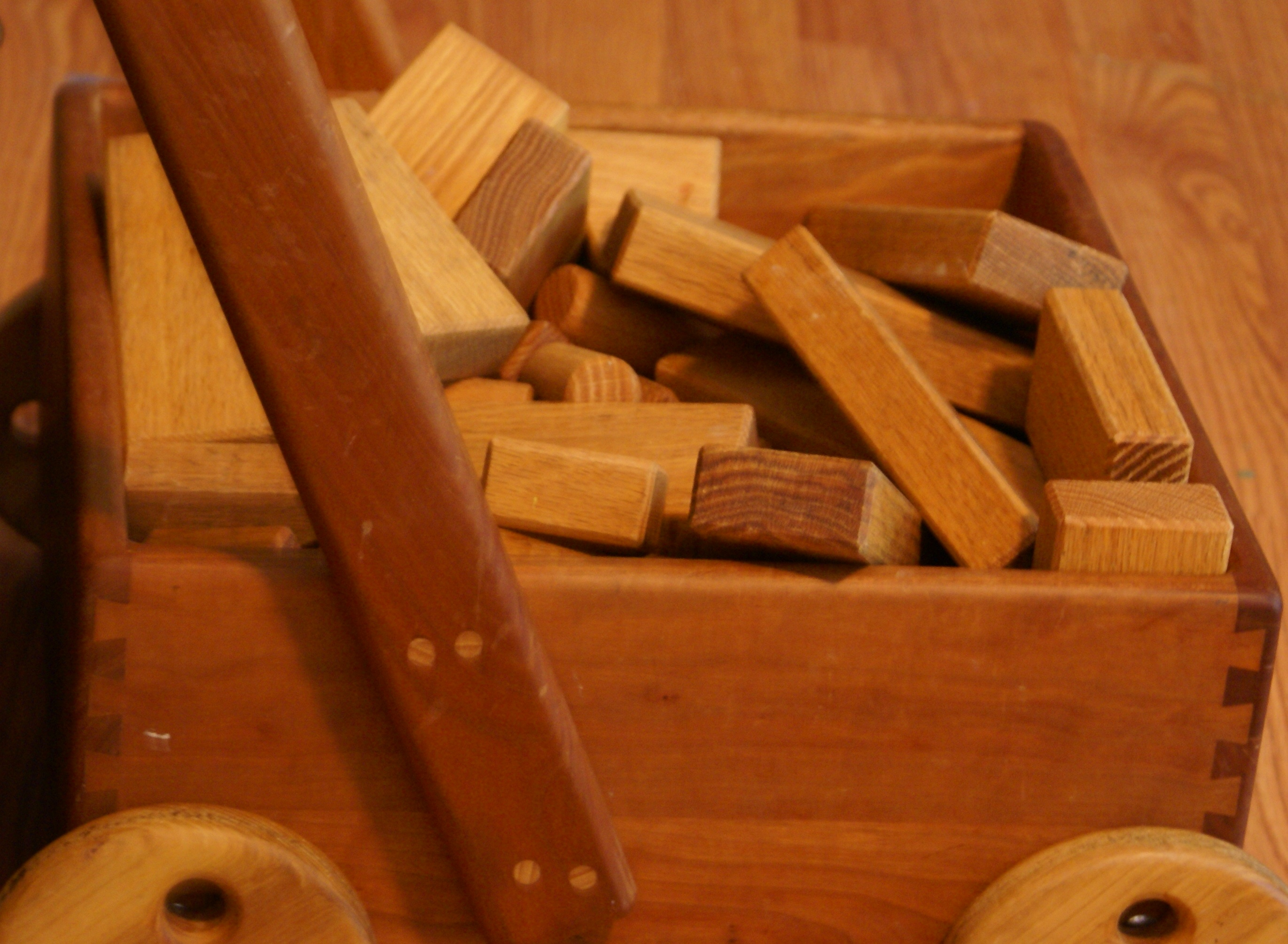
Wooden unit blocks in a wagon

A unit block is a type of standardized wooden toy block for children. Known also as standard unit blocks or kindergarten blocks, these building blocks are common in preschools and some kindergarten classrooms in the United States.

== Sizes ==
A unit block is 5.5 inches long, 2.75 inches wide, and 1.375 inches thick, giving the dimensions a 1:2:4 ratio. Larger pieces include the double (11 inches long) and quadruple (22 inches long) sizes. Smaller sizes are made in various fractions of the standard unit.

== History ==
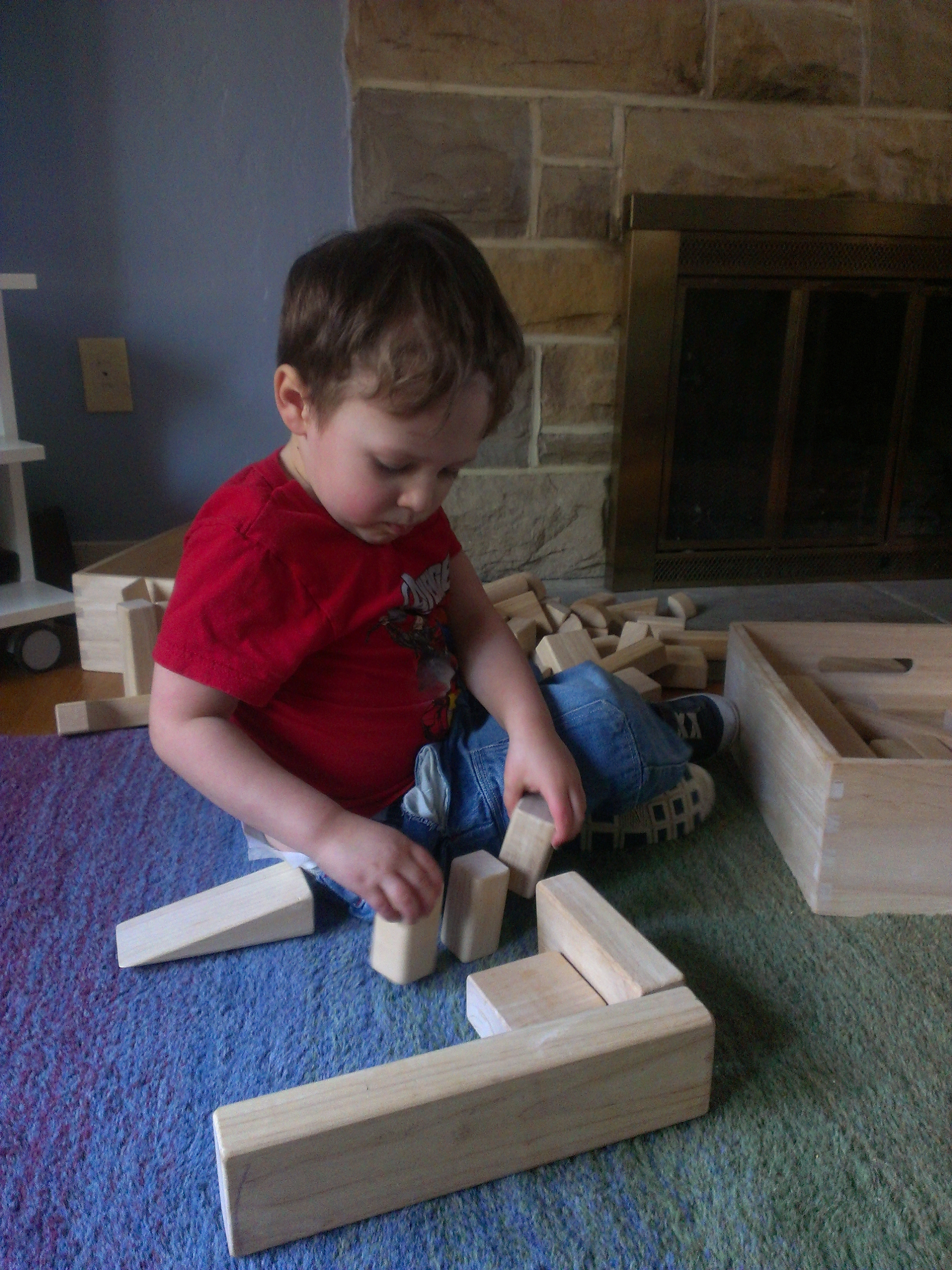
Child playing with unit blocks

The unit block principle was popularized by educator Caroline Pratt in the early 1900s. Pratt based her blocks on a similar but larger-scale block system designed by educator Patty Hill, a follower of Friedrich Fröbel, the originator of kindergarten education. Fröbel's series of 20 age-calibrated educational "gifts" had included a set of eight blocks, sized ½ by 1 by 2 inches, or a 1:2:4 ratio, which could be formed into a cube. She founded the City and Country School in 1914 in New York City. In the 1970s, under license from the school, a version of the blocks was sold by a company called Childcraft.

== Wood ==
Unit blocks vary in price according to the wood used and the manufacturer. Maple blocks (the original wood put forth by Pratt) are more expensive than birch or beech, which in turn are more expensive than rubberwood.

== See also ==
- Froebel Gifts
- Montessori sensorial materials
