= Jessie Stanton =

American authority on pre-school education and author (1887–1976)

- Born: 1887; Brooklyn, New York, U.S.
- Died: May 16, 1976; New York, New York, U.S.
- Education: Parker School in Brooklyn Heights; Ingleside School in New Milford, Connecticut
- Alma mater: Barnard College, 1919
- Occupations: Educator, Writer
- Writing career
- Genre: Preschool pedagogy
- Notable works: Before Books; Play Equipment for the Nursery School; The Taxi That Hurried (co-author)

Jessie Stanton (1887 – May 16, 1976) was an American authority on pre-school education and author closely associated with the Bank Street School.

== Life ==
Jessie Stanton was born in Brooklyn, in 1887. Stanton studied economics and philosophy at Barnard College, leaving in 1919.<re name=bsa/> Stanton next taught at the City and Country School for 10 years. She then went on to organize the Mt. Kemble School in Morristown, New Jersey. Following her time at Mt. Kemble, she served as assistant director of the Nursery School under Harriet Johnson and took over the directorship after Johnson's death in 1934. She resigned from the Nursery School in 1941. Stanton taught classes on child development and nursery education at Bank Street and several other institutions, including Vassar College’s Institute on Euthenics. She organized the nursery program for the Institute of Rehabilitation Medicine at New York University. She coordinated with Dr. Benjamin Spock and hosted on ‘’The Baby Institute’’, a nationwide daily radio program about young children. She served on the Board of Trustees for Bank Street, as well as for other private nursery schools, daycare centers and committees. She died in 1976.

== Recognition ==
Lucy Sprague Mitchell said of Stanton that “More than any grown-up I know, she is able to enter into a little child’s world and see things through a child’s eyes.”

== Selected works ==
- ‘’Before Books’’ (Adelphi Books, 1926)
- ‘’Play Equipment for the Nursery School’’ (Bank Street College of Education, no year listed)
- ‘’The Taxi that Hurried (co-written with Lucy Sprague Mitchell and Irma Simonton Black (Golden Books, 1946)

Her collected papers are held at the Bank Street College.

== Works cited ==
- Antler, Joyce. ‘’Lucy Sprague Mitchell’’. (Yale University Press, 1987)
- Kaplan, Morris. “Jessie Stanton, 89, Expert on Nursery Schools, Dies.” The New York Times obituary. May 18, 1976.
- Marcus, Leonard S. ‘’Awakened By The Moon’’. (HarperCollins, 1992)
