= Polakow =

Polakow is a surname. Notable people with the surname include:

- Grzegorz Polakow (born 1935), Polish footballer and manager
- Jason Polakow (born 1971), Australian windsurfer

== See also ==
- Sasha Polakow-Suransky (born 1979), American journalist and writer
- Shael Polakow-Suransky (born 1972)
