= Harriet Merrill Johnson =

American educator (1867–1934)

- Born: 1867; Bangor, Maine, U.S.
- Died: February 21, 1934 (aged 66–67)
- Occupation: Educator

Harriet Merrill Johnson (1867 – February 21, 1934) was an American educator.

== Life ==
She was born in 1867 in Bangor, Maine. She graduated from the Massachusetts Homeopathic Hospital and began working as a district nurse at the Henry Street Settlement. While working as a district nurse, Johnson became interested in the needs of children. She, Lucy Sprague Mitchell, and Caroline Pratt formed the Bureau of Education Experiments in 1916, now known as Bank Street College of Education. Their aim was to bring various specialists and researchers together for the purposes of studying experimental education. Johnson was the founder and first director of the bureau's nursery school, which was later named in her honor. This nursery school was the direct predecessor to Bank Street's School for Children, a private elementary school operating under the college's umbrella.

Johnson was the author of several texts on education:

- The Visiting Teacher (1916)
- A Nursery School Experiment: Descriptive Report (1924)
- Children in Nursery School (1928)
- The Art of Block Building (1933)
- School Begins at Two: A Book for Teachers and Parents (1936)

=== Harriet Johnson Nursery School ===
The Harriet Johnson Nursery School opened in 1918 at the Bureau's new quarters in a series of houses on West 12th and West 13th Street. The staff included teachers, psychologists and researchers who worked to discover the environments in which children grew and learned to their full potential. The staff observed how children learned, and they began documenting the learning process in order to determine the environments and educational practices best suited to foster the growth and development of children. Their findings contributed to a fundamental reform in the way children were taught. Graduates from Johnson's Nursery school went to Caroline Pratt's City and Country School. The nursery school also educated teachers and others on how to create these environments. Children at Johnson's Nursery school were given opportunities to draw, paint and model in clay. These were unusual forms of expression in schools at this time. A child's education was recognized as something other than prescribed curriculum. The children here and at Caroline Pratt's City and Country School, under the support of the Bureau, had all of New York City as their classroom. They were able to ride ferries, visit zoos and look at bridges.
