= Feagin =

Feagin is a surname. Notable people with the surname include:

- Arthur Feagin (1878–1932), American football player
- Joe Feagin (born 1938), American sociologist and social theorist
- Kaden Feagin (born 2004), American football player
- Marcus Feagin (born 1991), American basketball player
- Sania Feagin (born 2003), American basketball player
- Susan L. Feagin (born 1948), American philosopher
- Wiley Feagin (1937–1990), American football player
