= Red Hook =

Red Hook may refer to:

== Places ==
- Red Hook, Brooklyn, a neighborhood in Brooklyn, New York City, United States
- Red Hook graving dock, a graving dock formerly located in Red Hook, Brooklyn
- Red Hook, New York, a town in Dutchess County in the State of New York, United States
- Red Hook (village), New York, a village in the Town of Red Hook, New York, United States
- Red Hook, USVI, an area of Saint Thomas, United States Virgin Islands

== Other ==
- Red Hook (FBI), a surveillance tool developed by the Federal Bureau of Investigation
- Red Hook, a novel by Reggie Nadelson

== See also ==
- Redhook (disambiguation)
