= Jessica Lawson =

American writer

Jessica Lawson is an author of middle-grade books.

== Biography ==
Lawson attended Homestead High School in Indiana, going on to earn a BA in Spanish from the University of Denver and a MS in Outdoor Recreation and Natural Resource Management from Indiana University. She has lived in Colorado and Pennsylvania.

She began writing in mid-2009 after the birth of her first child. Lawson produced eight manuscripts before selling The Actual & Truthful Adventures of Becky Thatcher.

== Accolades ==
Publishers Weekly praised The Actual & Truthful Adventures of Becky Thatcher, as "a rewarding read" and "a delightfully clever debut" in a starred review. Bank Street College named Nooks & Crannies to its Best Children's Books of 2016 list.

== Selected works ==
- Lawson, Jessica; Bruno, Iacopo (illus) (June 2015). The Actual & Truthful Adventures of Becky Thatcher. Simon & Schuster. ISBN 9781481401531.
- Lawson, Jessica; Andrewson, Natalie (illus) (May 2016). Nooks & Crannies. Simon & Schuster. ISBN 9781481419222.
- Lawson, Jessica (May 2017). Waiting for Augusta. Simon & Schuster. ISBN 9781481448406.
- Lawson, Jessica (September 2017). Under the Bottle Bridge. Simon & Schuster. ISBN 9781481448420.
