= Susan L. Feagin =

Susan L. Feagin (11 July 1948 – 12 December 2024) was a philosopher of art, working in the analytic tradition. She was a Past President of the American Society for Aesthetics, Professor Emerita of the University of Missouri-Kansas City, and a Visiting Research Professor (Retired) in the Department of Philosophy at Temple University. She is known primarily for her work on the role of emotions in art.

== Biography ==
Feagin received a BA degree in Philosophy from Florida State University. She then completed both an MA and a PhD in Philosophy at the University of Wisconsin, where she worked under the supervision of Donald W. Crawford.

Before coming to Temple, she held teaching and research positions at the University of Wisconsin and University of Missouri-Kansas City. From 2003 to 2013 she was the Editor of the Journal of Aesthetics and Art Criticism. In 2016, she gave the Richard Wollheim Lecture at the Annual Meeting of the British Society of Aesthetics at the University of Oxford.

== Select publications ==
- “The Pleasures of Tragedy”, American Philosophical Quarterly 20(1):95-104, 1983
- Reading with Feeling: The Aesthetics of Appreciation, Cornell University Press, 1996
- Aesthetics, Oxford University Press, 1997 (co-editor with Patrick Maynard)
- Global Theories of the Arts and Aesthetics, Blackwell, 2007 (editor)
