= Leonard Suransky =

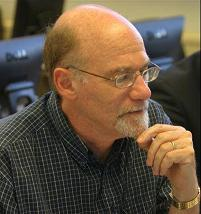
- Born: 2 December 1942 (age 83); Johannesburg, South Africa
- Education: University of Michigan
- Occupation: Department head
- Children: Shael Polakow-Suransky, Sasha Polakow-Suransky, Sarafina Suransky and Sonya Suransky

Leonard Suransky (born 2 December 1942) is a South African-born doctor of International Relations and Education, and is the former Head of the Department of International Relations at Webster University in Leiden, Netherlands. Subsequently, he headed the IR department of Webster University in Accra, Ghana from 2014 to 2019, and still taught there by Zoom in 2022. He is currently the co-chair of the University of the Third Age (U3a) in Cape Town, and the Chair of the Camps Bay U3a branch.

== Early life and education ==
Suransky was born and raised in South Africa to a Lithuanian-Jewish family. He has a BA from Hebrew University Jerusalem, an MSc in International Relations from the London School of Economics, and a PhD from the University of Michigan, Ann Arbor. He specializes in designing and administering International Relations games and simulations in the academic, public and corporate sectors. His son Shael Polakow-Suransky is the president of Bank Street College of Education. His second son Sasha Polakow-Suransky is an Associate Editor of 'Foreign Policy' in London. His daughter Sarafina is a psychologist in the Netherlands, specialising in Schema Therapy at a Viersprong clinic. Sonya works for the high-tech employment agency SALT in Cape Town. He is Jewish, and was an anti-apartheid activist in South Africa before he emigrated to the USA in 1973, then lived for 11 years in the Netherlands, and has been living in Cape Town, South Africa since 2011.

== Research interests ==
His current research interests include transitions to democracy in Africa, development issues and poverty alleviation, identity politics, and conflict and crisis management in the Greater Middle East and Southern Africa. More recently, he has taught about China's role in Africa, the Old and New Silk Roads, xenophobia, corruption, populism, and the Russo-Ukrainian war and its implications for the current world order.

== Awards ==
In his Ann Arbor years, he was awarded the Outstanding Lecturer award for his work in the Arab-Israeli Conflict course, with the simulation exercise he developed. He received the Des Lee Visiting Lectureship in Global Awareness at Webster University. Upon winning the Des Lee Visiting Lectureship in Global Awareness, Suransky stated "When I first saw the words ‘global awareness’ in the title of the award, I immediately thought ‘that’s not enough.’ After finding out about a problem intellectually, how does one get to feel something about it? That involves empathy and compassion. This could involve taking some personal risk, perhaps even exposing oneself to some danger. So, in a nutshell, how do we move from understanding (becoming globally aware), to compassion for others in our global village, to action to transform the often inequitable realities of a dramatically skewed world?"

== Lectures given ==
- "The Global Economy and the Subversion of Indigenous Local Cultures" - Given at the 22nd Annual Scientific Meeting of the International Society of Political Psychology in July 1999.
- "Globalization: Scourge of the South", Given at the 21st Annual Scientific Meeting of the International Society of Political Psychology in July 1998, as part of the 2nd panel on Globalization and Gender Identities.

== Publications ==
- Is-dit-het-einde-van-het-Arabisch-Israelisch-conflicthttps://www.scienceguide.nl/2022/04// April 2022
- Training the warrior diplomat: enhancing negotiation and conflict management skills through experiential learning. Journal of International Negotiation, Vol. 15, No. 2, Special Issue on Simulation Games
- Baby-sitting or Bird watching? The Role of Supervision in IR Simulation Exercises. In Organizing and Learning through Gaming and Simulation, Mayer, I & Mastik H. (eds.) 2008.
- How to InterACT in conflict settings – The Role of Supervision in IR Simulation Exercises. Organizing and Learning through Gaming and Simulation, Proceeding of ISAGA 2007, Eburon, Delft
- Globalisation: Scourge of Africa? Occasional Paper -Foundation for Global Dialogue, Johannesburg, 2000
- South Africa in the Chair: Lifting SADC to viability as a regional platform, African Security Review, 2000
- Democracy and Governance, part of a volume on DEMOCRACY for an INTRODUCTION TO SOCIAL STUDIES, with Lynnaia Main, Juta and Company, Kenwyn, 1997
- Member of the National Education Policy Investigation (NEPI) Post-secondary Education Research and Co-ordinatingGroup, Post-secondary Education, Oxford University Press/NECC, Cape Town, 1992
- What are We Educating For? The Psychological Cultural Dimension, with Ward, A., and Beaumont K.
- NEPI working paper for the Post-Secondary Education report, NECC, Johannesburg, 1992.
- Rationalisation at Michigan University -a case of 'smaller but better': lessons for South African Universities, in RESTRUCTURING SOUTH AFRICAN TERTIARY EDUCATION, eds. Hartman N., and Scott Ian, Udusa, Jhb., 1990.
- New Places, New Faces, and New Tastes: The Foreign Policy of a Liberated South Africa, INTERNATIONAL AFFAIRS BULLETIN, Vol. 13,3,1989.
- "International Relations Games and Simulations." In The Guide to Simulations/Games for Education and Training, edited by Robert Horn and Anne Cleaves. Beverly Hills, CA: Sage.
- Neve ShalomlWahat al-Salaam: Disseminating Images of Hope, MIDDLE EAST PEACE NOTES, American Friends Service, Ann Arbor, July 1987.
- Towards the Dissemination of the Michigan International Conflict Simulation Game, Suransky, L. SIMAGES, Vol. 4, No.1. Fall 1982
- "International Relations Games and Simulations." In The Guide to Simulations/Games for Education and Training, edited by Robert Horn and Anne Cleaves. Beverly Hills, CA: Sage.1983

== See also ==
- Pax Ludens
