= Paul C. Taylor =

American philosopher, author, and W (born 1967)

Paul Christopher Taylor (born September 19, 1967) is an American philosopher, author, and was W. Alton Jones Professor of Philosophy at Vanderbilt University until moving to UCLA in the summer of 2023. Previously he taught philosophy and African American studies at Pennsylvania State University. He completed his undergraduate degree at Morehouse College and graduate degrees at both the Harvard Kennedy School and Rutgers University. He writes on race theory, aesthetics, pragmatism, social and political philosophy, and Africana philosophy.

Taylor has published three monographs, edited two collections of essays, and has written many articles in peer-reviewed journals. His book Black Is Beautiful: A Philosophy of Black Aesthetics (Blackwell, 2016) was the winner of the American Society for Aesthetics Outstanding Monograph Prize in 2017. In 2019 he gave The Harvard Review of Philosophy's annual lecture.

Taylor works mostly on the philosophy of race. His first book Race: A Philosophical Introduction (2004) explores the concept of race from a metaphysical, pragmatic and analytical point of view. In Black Is Beautiful: A Philosophy of Black Aesthetics (2016) Taylor examines the intersection of African American philosophy and aesthetics. The term 'black aesthetics' refers to "the practice of using art, criticism, or analysis to explore the role that expressive objects and practices play in creating and maintaining black life-worlds" (p. 12). He claims that African American culture is "not so much born as assembled". His book On Obama (2016), examines the historic election of the first African-American president of the United States of America, Barack Obama. Together with Linda Martín Alcoff and Luvell Anderson he edited the Routledge Companion to Philosophy of Race (2018).

== Publications ==
=== Monographs ===
- Race: A Philosophical Introduction (Cambridge, UK: Polity – Blackwell, 2004; 2nd ed., 2013)
- Black Is Beautiful: A Philosophy of Black Aesthetics (Blackwell, 2016)
- On Obama (Routledge, 2016)

=== Edited volumes ===
- The Philosophy of Race (four volumes; Routledge, 2012)
- The Routledge Companion to the Philosophy of Race (with Linda Martín Alcoff and Luvell Anderson - Routledge, 2017)

=== Articles and essays ===
- "Race in/and the Philosophy of Literature," in Noel Carroll and John Gibson, eds., The Routledge Companion to Philosophy of Literature (New York: Routledge, 2016).
- "Towards a Decolonial Analytic Philosophy: Institutional Corruption and Epistemic Culture," in Sally Matthews and Pedro Tabensky, eds., Being At Home: Race, Institutional Culture, and Transformation at South African Higher Education Institutions (Durban, South Africa: University of KwaZulu-Natal Press, 2015).
- "Taking Post-Racialism Seriously: From Movement Mythology to Racial Formation," The Du Bois Review 11.1 (Spring 2014).
- "Bare Ontology and Social Death," Philosophical Papers (South Africa), Vol. 42, No. 3 (November 2013): 371–391.
- "Living Pictures, Dead Souls," Transition No. 104 (1 January 2011), pp. 58–72.
- "Melting Whites and Liberated Latinas: Identity, Fate, and Character in 'Fools Rush In'," In Ethics in Film, Ward Jones and Samantha Vice, eds. (Oxford University Press, 2010).
- "The Last King of Scotland or The Last N----r on Earth: The Ethics of Race on Film," Contemporary Aesthetics, Volume 2 (2009) – Special issue: Aesthetics and Race: New Philosophical Perspectives (Monique Roelofs, ed.)
- "Does Hip Hop Belong to Me? The Philosophy of Race and Culture", In Hip Hop and Philosophy, D. Darby & T. Shelby, eds. (InOpen Court, 2005)
