= Redhook =

Redhook may refer to:

- Redhook Ale Brewery, an American brewing company
- RedHook (band), an Australian rock band
- Redhook, an imprint of Orbit Books

== See also ==
- Red Hook (disambiguation)
