= Pax Ludens =

Non-profit organization

Pax Ludens is a non-profit organization specialized in training and research on international conflict and crisis management. The mission of the organization is to help future decision makers tackle complex international political dynamics and excel in conflict management. The core activities are described as the design and execution of seminars and simulation exercises based on real and current case studies in the field of International Relations and conflict resolution. The programs offered challenge participants to explore various international political conflict scenarios and deal with crisis and conflict situations as events unfold.

== Key partners ==
- The Clingendael institute
- The Hague Centre for Strategic Studies
- The Turkish Ministry of Foreign affairs
- Delft Technical University
- The Netherlands Ministry of Defence staff training college
- The University of Amsterdam
- Webster University Leiden and London
- University College Utrecht
- The University of Monterrey, Mexico
- Vrede van Utrecht

== Scenarios ==
Some example of the scenarios used are:

- Greater Middle East
- Caucasus
- Israeli-Palestinian conflict
- Good governance in Africa
- UN Security Council

== Publications ==
- Mans and Shimshon. Knowledge creation and transfer in the military. Journal of International Negotiations. Publication forthcoming 2010.
- Mans, Shimshon, Suransky and Hilst. Baby-sitting or bird watching? The Role of Supervision in IR Simulation Exercises. In Organizing and Learning through Gaming and Simulation Igor Mayer & Hanneke Mastik (eds.) 2008.
- Mans, Shimshon, Suransky and Hilst. How to InterACT in conflict settings - The Role of Supervision in IR Simulation Exercises. In: Igor Mayer & Hanneke Mastik (eds.) 2007, Organizing and Learning through Gaming and Simulation, Proceedings of Isaga 2007, Eburon, Delft
- Mans and Shimshon. International Conflict Management “Analysis & Intervention” Training Manual. Clingendael Institute & Pax Ludens. 2005.
- Suransky, Leonard (1983) “International Relations Games and Simulations.” In The Guide to Simulations/Games for Education and Training, edited by Robert Horn and Anne Cleaves. Beverly Hills, CA: Sage.
- Suransky, Leonard. (1980) The Play of Consciousness and Educational Praxis – a Phenomenology of Learning with the Middle East Conflict Simulation Game. USA: University of Michigan Ann Arbour

== See also ==
- Leonard Suransky
