= Scribner Ames =

American painter

- Ames in 1962
- Born: Polly Scribner Ames; February 16, 1908; Chicago, Illinois, U.S.
- Died: December 28, 1993 (aged 85); Chicago, Illinois

Scribner Ames (1908–1993) was an American artist known for her paintings and sculpture. Her paintings included portraits, still lifes, landscapes, and abstractions. Her portrait sitters were often children or well-known men and women in the performing arts. Born and raised in Chicago, she worked first in Manhattan and later returned to her birth city. She also made repeated trips to Europe and, once, to the West Indies. Although she admired the work of Cézanne, Braque, and Marsden Hartley, her painting was, as one critic said, "not derivative". Critics noted her effective handling of color and one said she was "particularly noted for her work in creating movement through space by the use of color perspective." In her carved wood sculpture, critics generally noted the influence of her teacher, José de Creeft.

An advocate for progressive education, Ames taught art for many years in a private school and in her own studio. She was an author, although her publications were few. She wrote and illustrated a book called Marsden Hartley in Maine and she wrote journal articles and letters to the editor on art education, abstraction in art, and the pernicious tendency of collectors and commercial galleries to promote bad art.

== Early life and training ==
Ames attended schools in Chicago. She entered the freshman class of the University of Chicago in 1923 and graduated with a Bachelor of Philosophy degree in 1928. (Note: In her day, BPh was the dominant degree received by graduates of the Colleges of Arts, Literature, and Sciences.) After graduating, she studied at the School of the Art Institute of Chicago and then traveled in Europe, where she studied sculpture in Munich with Hans Schwegerle. Returning to the United States in 1933, she made her home in Manhattan and there studied painting with Hans Hofmann and sculpture with José de Creeft.

== Career in art ==
(1)Scribner Ames, Still Life #2, about 1930, oil on heavy paper, 23 1/2 x 17 1/2 inches

(2) Scribner Ames, The Gift, image printed in Art News, May 1936 (v. 24, n. 32, p. 5)

(3) Scribner Ames, Sigurd Rasher, about 1942, charcoal sketch on paper, 20 x 16 inches

(4) Scribner Ames, Dark Birds, image printed in the University of Chicago Magazine, December 1958 (v. 51, n. 3, p. 29)

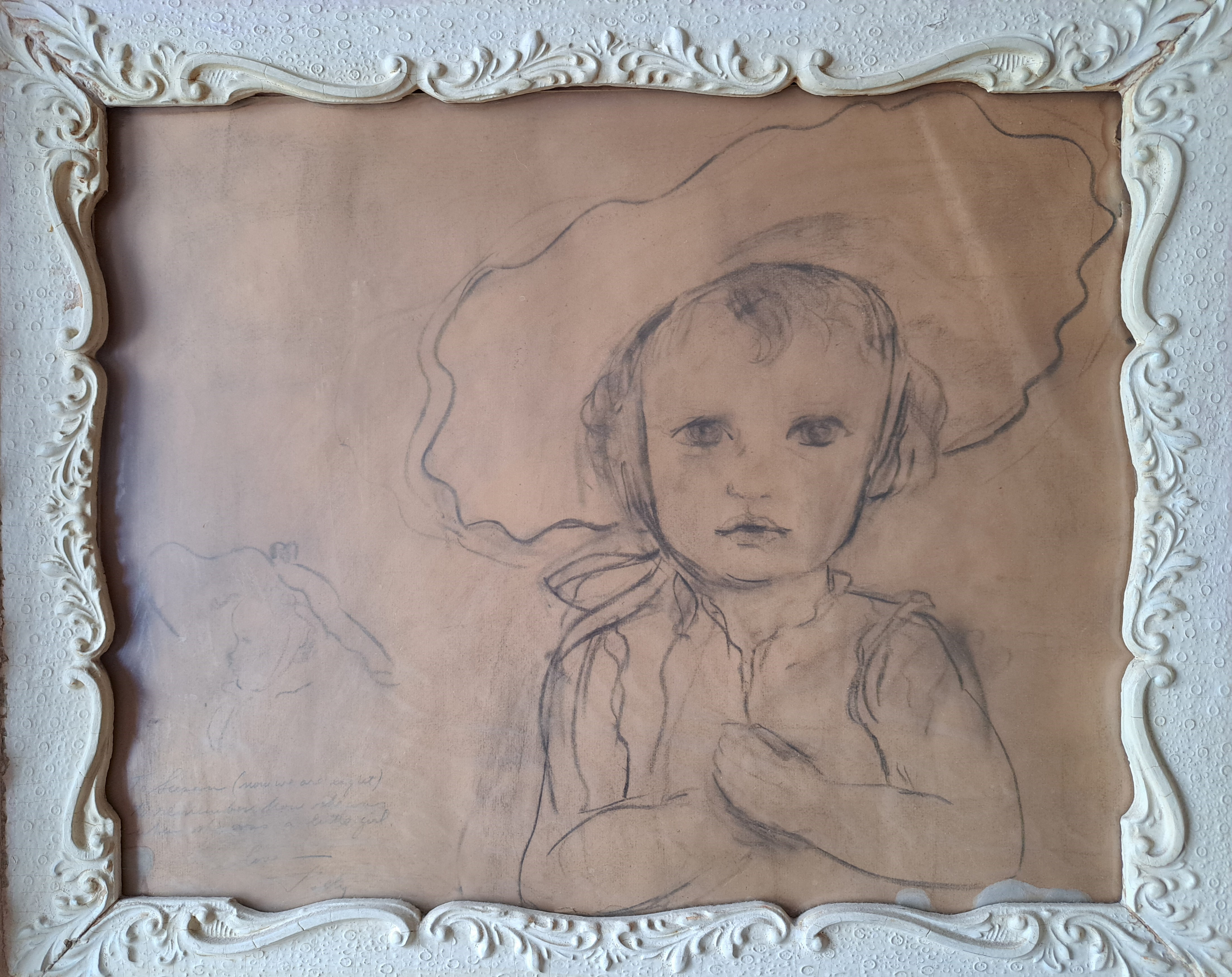
Scribner Ames, Susan Fisher, about 1945, charcoal sketch on paper, 20 x 16 inches

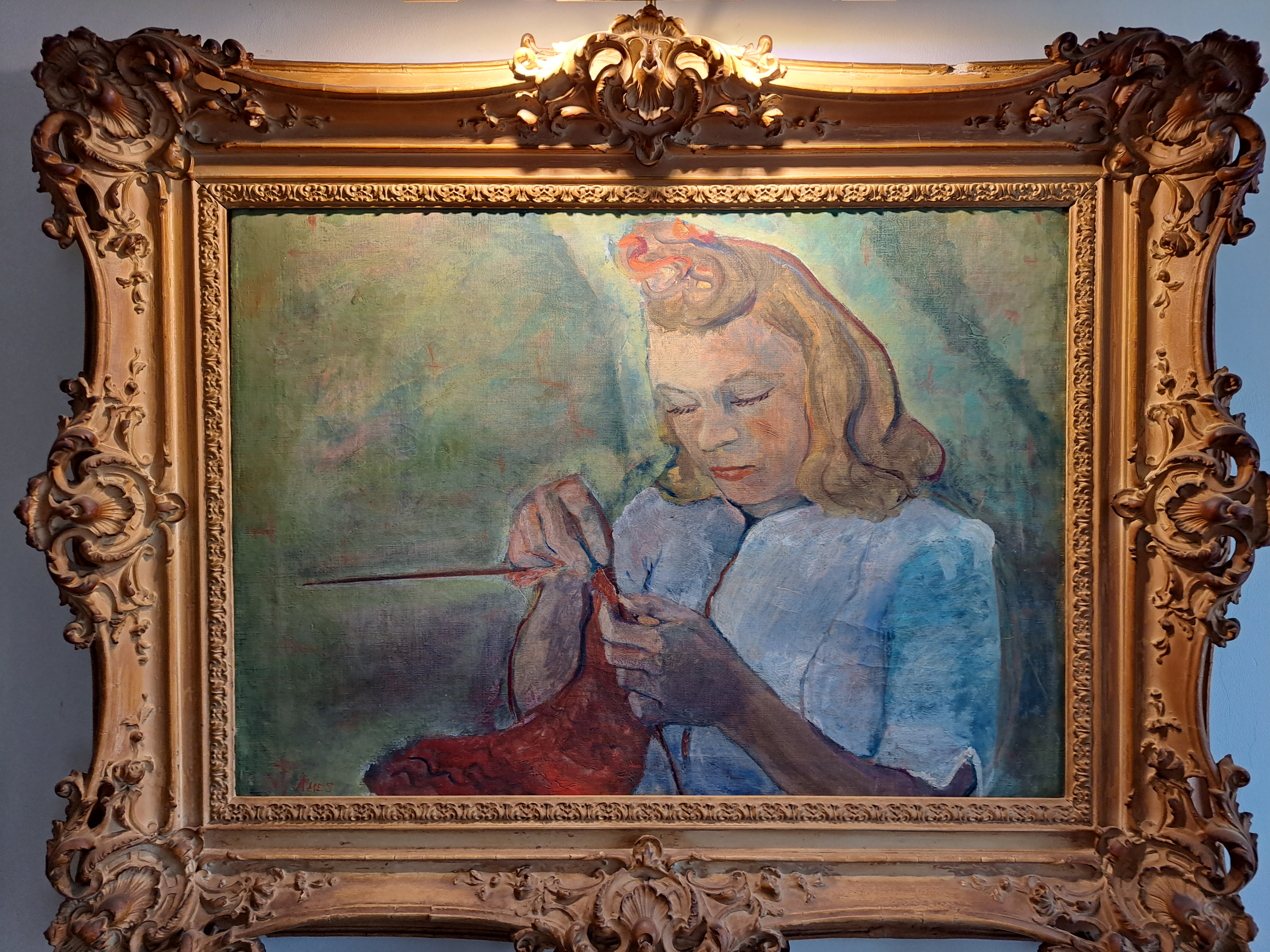
Polly Scribner Ames (American, Chicago, 1908-1993). Oil on canvas - Portrait of Anne Fisher Knitting. Signed lower left.

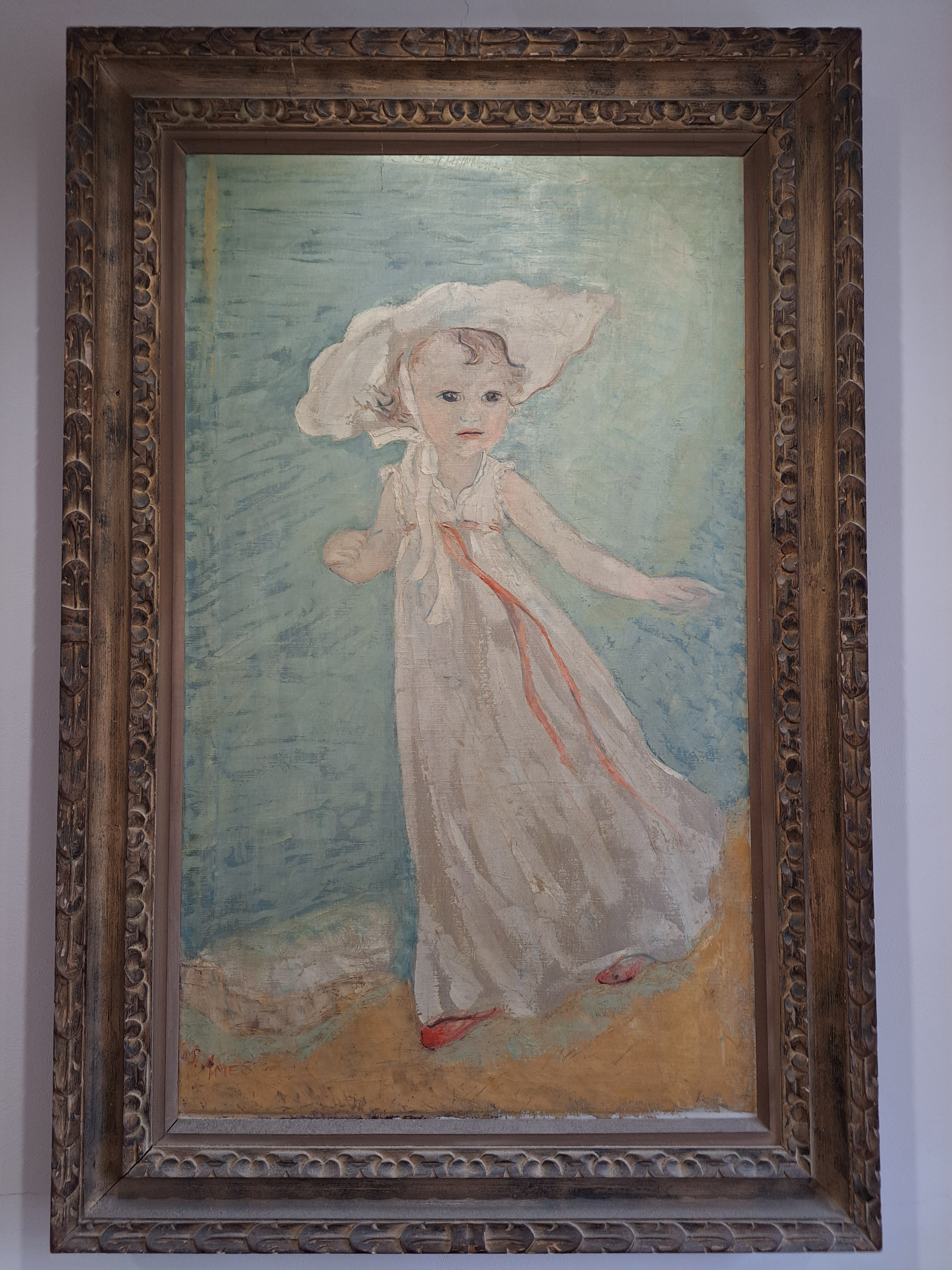
Polly Scribner Ames (American, Chicago, 1908-1993). Oil on canvas – Full length portrait of Susan Fisher. Signed lower left.

Ames showed a still life in the annual Society of Independent Artists exhibition of 1935. Noting that her painting was "interesting and promising", a critic praised its "especially notable" use of color. The review did not name the painting. "Still Life #2"", shown above, no. 1, is an example of her still life work at the time. The next year, a critic for Art News called attention to a painting of hers called "The Gift" at a Salons of America exhibition, saying it ranked "as one of the more notable pictures" in that large and diverse show. In addition to the critic's review, the magazine included an image of the painting (shown above, no. 2).

She spent the summer of 1938 traveling in Scandinavia. A year later, she was given her first solo exhibition, a display of paintings and carved-wood sculptures at the Bonstell Gallery in New York. The show received excellent reviews in Art News and the New York Times. Ruth Green Harris of the Times said of Ames, "She works lightly in a high key. Her brush, it would seem, just flicking the canvas, first here, then there. But in the end, the matter is gathered understandingly within the frame." The critic for Art News said the diversity of Ames's works showed her to be "consciously seeking individual expressions for her obvious talents." In 1943 and 1944, Ames was given two more solo exhibitions, the first at the Puma Gallery and the second at the Eleanor Smith Gallery in St. Louis. The latter included oil paintings, drawings, watercolors and wood sculptures. In reviewing it, a local critic said a portrait of the Danish-American opera singer, Povla Frijsh, was outstanding.

Ames participated in group exhibitions during the 1940s, including appearances at a new gallery called "Number 10" and at a gallery in the clubhouse of the American Women's Association in New York, both in 1940. She participated in a members' exhibition at the American British Art Center, a group show at New York's Puma Gallery, and a show at a gallery run by the Friends of Greece, all in 1943. A review of the Puma show in Art Digest mentions Ames's portrait of a then-popular orchestral saxophone soloist, Sigurd Rasher, and Art News subsequently printed an image of the painting. Howard Devree of the New York Times also called attention to the portrait, calling its subject a "flaming saxophonist". A sketch for this painting is shown above, no. 3.

In 1947, Ames traveled to Curaçao in the Netherlands Antilles with the Dutch-born sculptor, Jacoba Coster, and there was given a solo exhibition at the city's Cultural Center. After her return, she showed some of her portraits in a two-artist exhibition with the sculptor, Marie Taylor, at the Carroll-Knight Gallery in St. Louis. A local critic noted in particular paintings she had made in Curaçao of a composer, Paul Nordoff, and a Dutch-born educator, Frater Radulphus, who was revered as the "Father Flanagan of Curaçao". Ames spent most of 1948 and 1949 in Europe. During that time, she held a solo exhibition at Cercle Universitaire-Interallie, Aix-en-Provence, and after her return was given solo exhibitions at Galerie Chardin in Paris and the Esher-Surrey Gallery, The Hague, Holland.

In 1953, Ames moved from New York to Chicago to look after her aging father and thereafter began to participate in the city's art scene. She joined the Renaissance Society at the University of Chicago and participated in the artist members' exhibition held there in 1955. A reviewer for the Chicago Tribune found one of the landscape paintings she showed to be an "outstanding" discovery in this show. When the society held another membership show the following year, the Chicago Tribune printed a photo of Ames calling her "an artist who doubles the excellence of her technique with sentiment, tenderness, and feeling for beauty." That year, she also held a solo show of paintings and sculpture at Chicago's 1020 Art Center. This exhibition received one of the few negative reviews of her career. A critic for Art News called her paintings "literal and prettified, thin surface records" and called her sculptures "derivative, indecisive carvings in the de Creef style." At least one person appears to have disagreed with this review in that three works, a sculpture and two paintings were stolen from the gallery during the show.

She was given solo shows at the Cromer & Quint Gallery in 1958, at the Little Gallery in 1959 (both in Chicago), and at New York's Poindexter Gallery in 1960. The Tribune's critic called the flower studies and small abstractions of the Cromer & Quint exhibition "unusually interesting". She was able to borrow her commissioned portrait of the actress Geraldine Page for the Poindexter show. This painting was made in 1959 during the original Broadway production of "Sweet Bird of Youth" and was hung in the Martin Beck Theater where the play was performed.

During the late 1950s, Ames continued to participate in group exhibitions in Chicago, including ones at the Art Institute (1957 and 1959), the Arts Club (1958 and 1959), and Cromer & Quint (1959). The 1958 Arts Club show included a painting, "Dark Birds", which one critic called "powerful, richly toned" and which was reproduced in an article on Ames in the University of Chicago Magazine later that year. A reproduction of this image is shown above, no. 4.

During the 1960s, Ames had solo exhibitions at Clossen's Gallery in Cincinnati (1961), the Bresler Galleries in Milwaukee (1961), the Chicago Public Library (1962), and at the Carson Pirie Scott department store in Urbana, Illinois (1967). A local critic called the portrait of Geraldine Page a "true triumph" in the Cincinnati show. The exhibition at the Chicago Public Library drew forth a lengthy review from the Tribune's critic, Edith Weigle. She summarized Ames's career and commented favorably on her style, quoting Ames on "the elusive search to catch the movement of light and space on a flat surface", a search that she said always "falls short". The review was accompanied by a photo of Ames with three large abstract paintings (shown in the box at the top of this article). The department store exhibition was a large one: 51 works in all, including oil paintings, watercolors, sculptures, and drawings.

Ames's group shows during this period included an exhibition of Chicago artists at the Portrait Center (1960) and an exhibition of contemporary portraits by Renaissance Society members (1960) as well as exhibitions at the Illinois State Museum (1961), Chicago Society of Artists (1963), and Chicago Arts Club (1961 and 1966). A bronze sculpture named "Young Satyr and Friend" received a purchase prize at the Illinois State Museum show.

There are no reports of Ames's participation in exhibitions between 1967 and her death in 1993.

=== Artistic style ===
Ames was both painter and sculptor. Her sculptures were mainly in carved wood and sometimes in cast bronze. Her painted subjects included landscapes, still lifes, and both semi- and pure abstractions. She was best known for her portraits, particularly ones having children as subjects as well as prominent men and women in the performing arts. Many, perhaps most, of the portraits were commissioned. Of those having children as subjects, the best-known shows the two children of Mr. and Mrs. Lloyd W. Powers Jr. seated at the piano. The best known of her celebrity portraits include concert saxophonist, Sigurd Rasher; opera singer, Povla Frijsh; classical composer, Paul Nordoff; actor, Geraldine Page; and fashion model Marion Morehouse. A reviewer once said Ames did not aim for realism in her portraits believing that "the painting of a human being has the same approach as a landscape or still life—it is the movement created through the color that is more important than the subject."

Ames discussed the importance of color in other contexts as well. In 1937 she wrote that "color, form, and light" were the "pure elements" of a painter's medium. She asked, "If the form does not grow out of the color itself, of what significance is color in painting?" Regarding the use of abstraction, she once told a reporter, that throughout history "all good art has abstract elements". In another context she said, "It is my experience that the actual process of painting is what is most important because in the elusive search to catch the movement of light and space on a flat surface, one falls so short. It is always the next canvas we hope will surely say what we are after."

== Art teacher and author ==
Between 1939 and 1942 Ames was an art instructor at a tiny school in Greenwich Village called the City and Country School. The school's directors believed that children learn best when their activities are self-directed and hands-on. In 1939, Ames wrote a journal article on this topic from an art teacher's point of view. She said students should choose their own subjects when making art. They should be taught technique by indirect means, such as showing foreshortening by holding a pencil upright on the floor and asking the student to draw it from above. She said this approach would allow students to create works of art that were not just accurately drawn but also aesthetically pleasing. She gave private lessons in her studios, first in New York and then in Chicago.

In 1937, Ames participated in a debate about abstract art that began when Edward Alden Jewell of the New York Times wrote an article on the Guggenheim Foundation's art collection and its planned Museum of Non-Objective Art. Although the debate started as a consideration of non-objective (or subject-less) art versus all other, it developed into a discussion of the full range of abstract art, pitting abstract modern art against art that was considered to be traditional and time-tested. In her contribution, Ames responded to a letter from the dancer, comedian, and film actress, Elise Cavanna (then known as Elise Armitage), who wrote that there was no future in abstract art because it mattered only to "a few perspicacious artists, collectors and laymen." Taking a position that she shared with the critic Jewell, she said, "There is no great art that is not abstract." In her view, modern abstract artists could be seen as working to recover the Old Masters' "unity of spiritual and artistic expression". She saw contemporary artists as continuing a tradition that stretched back to ancient times and said it was unhelpful to pigeonhole them by using divisive terminology.

In 1945, she entered another dispute in the Times, this one over a supposed "chaos" in the New York art world of that time. Writing on March 4, lawyer and art collector, Sam A. Lewisohn, complained an "incongruous jumble in the galleries" having "no continuity and no sequence". Ames agreed that there was chaos but said it was not the artists' fault. She believed collectors and galleries were the cause and artists the victims. In a strongly worded letter, she said the creative energy of artists would persevere despite the "trickery, wars, and material lack of integrity" of collectors and galleries. She also presciently predicted that, "in spite of all the panic of the little egos to be heard (through the wonderful and terrible devices of publicity), we are on the verge of our own great creative era".

Scribner Ames, Water Color of the Church, Corea, ME, from Marsden Hartley in Maine, written and illustrated by Scribner Ames (1972, Orono, University of Maine Press)

In 1945, Ames wrote a short memoir about Marsden Hartley. Set in the period at the end of his life when he lived in the home of a Maine lobsterman and his wife, it was written as if through the eyes of the wife, Katie Young, a long-term resident whose foreign birth set her apart from the other inhabitants of the tiny village of Corea, Maine. Ames had met Katie and her husband Forrest when she visited Hartley in the chicken-coop studio the Youngs had lent him. After writing it, she kept the typed manuscript among her possessions until 1959 when she donated it to the Smithsonian Archives of American Art. The University of Maine press published the manuscript in 1972 as Marsden Hartley in Maine. The book was edited by Richard S. Sprague, an English professor at the university who was also responsible for acquiring the typescript and arranging for publication. The book had a foreword by the art critic and historian Elizabeth McCausland and an afterword by Carl Sprinchorn, a Swedish-American artist known for paintings made in the North Maine Woods. Ames illustrated the work with line drawings and watercolors. One reviewer said the book was "not really about Hartley at all, though he is certainly a part of the tale. The book is really about friendship, about living and dying, and about how we respond to the death of a loved one. Another reviewer wrote that "Miss Ames's prose is rarely pretentious, and it has always a pleasant flavor of her artist's eye as she sets the scene for Katie's own story. The drawings and watercolors are likewise simple, appropriately reflecting both the homeliness of Hartley's final residence and the sense of absence without him." A watercolor of the church in Correa, shown above at right, is one of the book's illustrations.

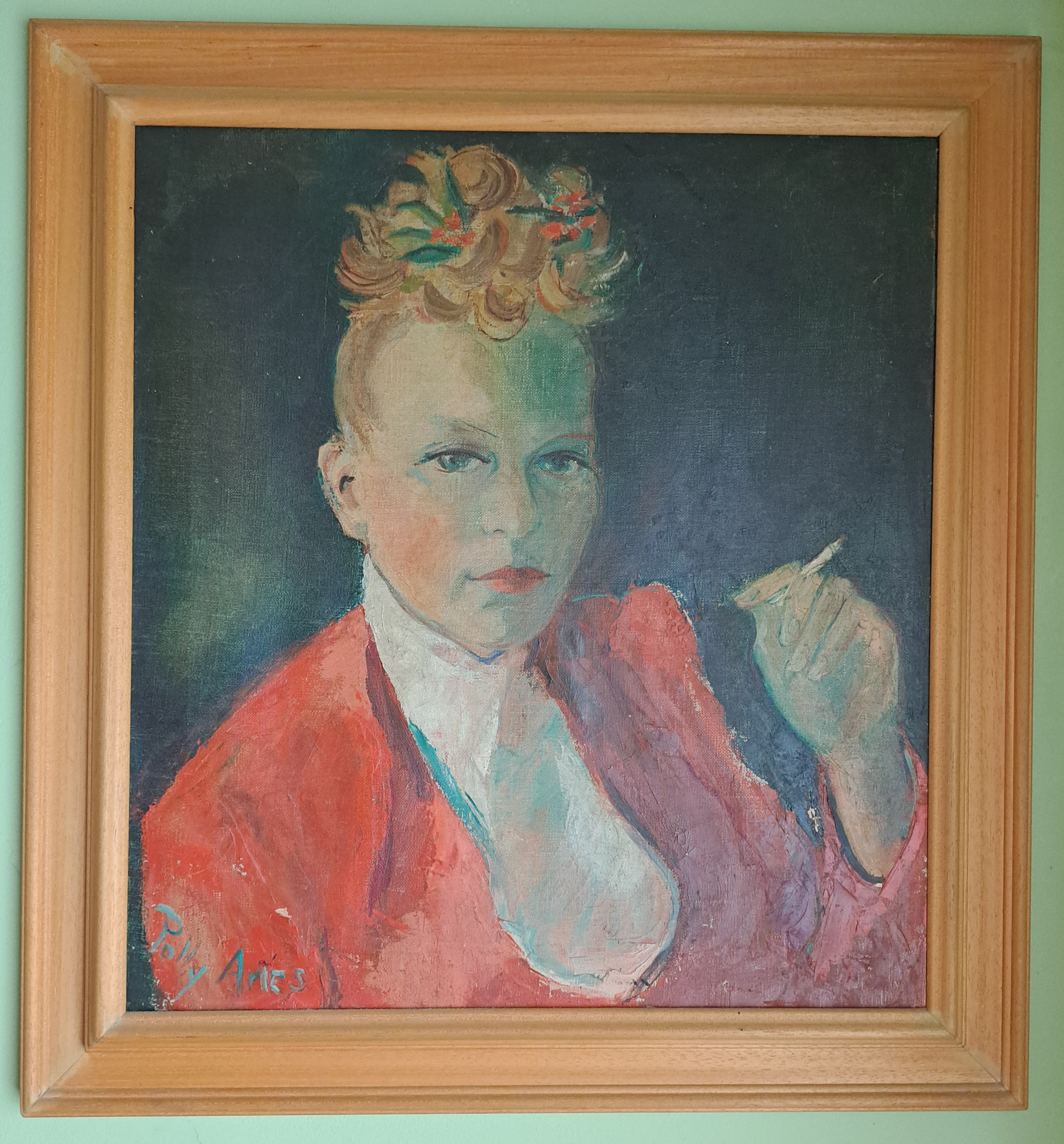
Polly Scribner Ames (American, Chicago, 1908-1993). Oil on canvas - Portrait of Anne Edman Fisher. Signed lower left.

Ames wrote other manuscripts including poetry, short stories, and some nonfiction articles. She also wrote a memoir called "A Chance of My Making" about her post-war travels and the exhibitions she was given in Paris and The Hague.

== Personal life and family ==
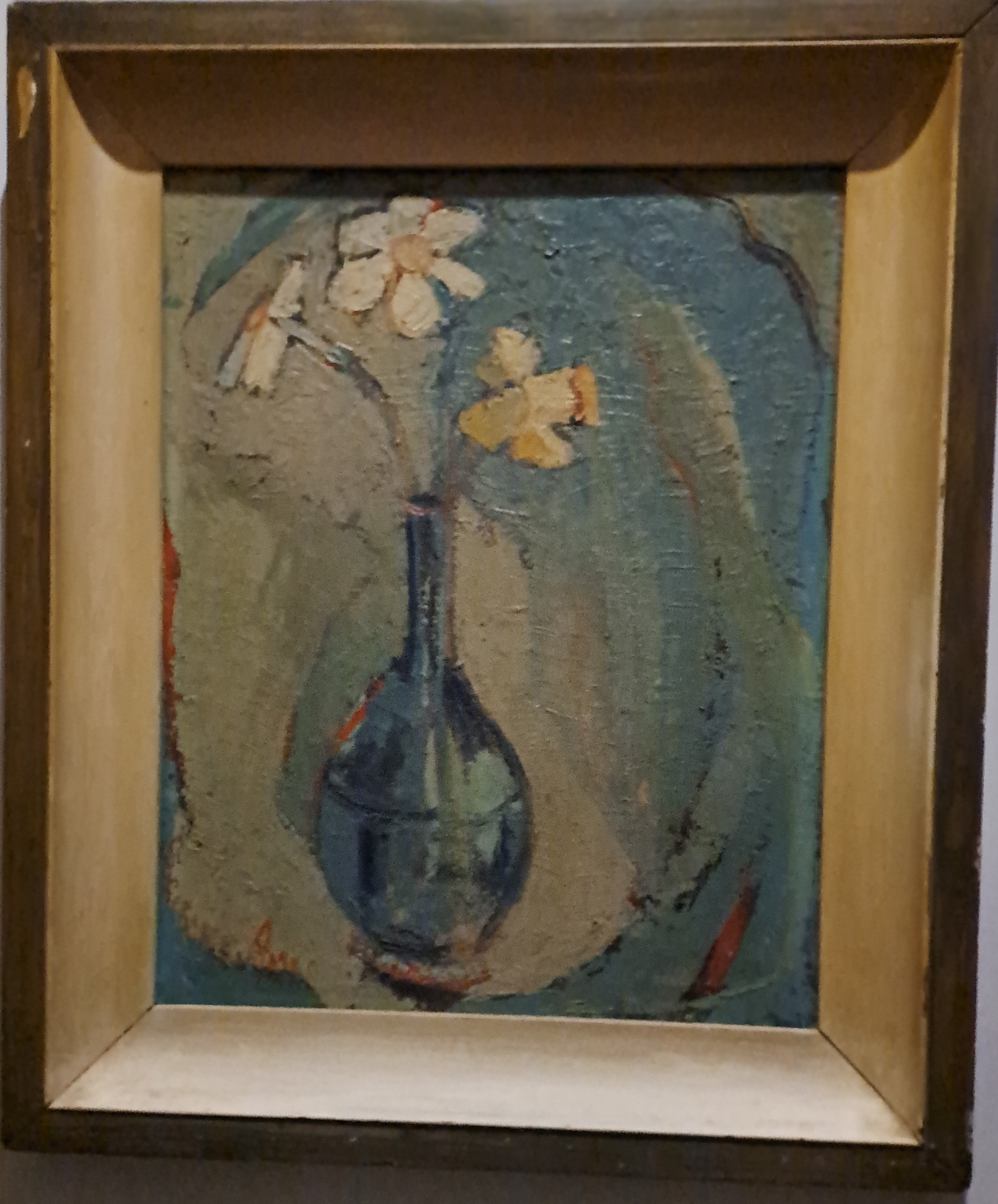
Polly Scribner Ames (American, Chicago, 1908-1993). Oil on wood - Vase with Daffodils. Signed lower left.

Ames was born in Chicago on February 16, 1908. Her birth name was Polly Scribner Ames. Her father was Edward Scribner Ames (1870–1958), a professor of philosophy at the University of Chicago and minister of the Disciples of Christ church. Her mother was Mabel Van Meter Ames (1869–1953). Ames had two sisters, Demaris (1901–1985) and Adelaide (born 1905), and a brother, Van Meter (1898–1985). Demaris lived in the Washington D.C. area where her husband worked for State Department. Adelaide lived in Copenhagen with her artist husband. Van Meter was a Professor of Philosophy at the University of Cincinnati.

During her college years, Ames was an active participant in university organizations (sports, rhythmic dancing, a literary club called Mortar Board), but did not do studio art.

When she moved to Chicago in 1953, her father moved into her apartment and she helped care for him until his death in 1958.

During her youth and well into her career, she called herself Polly Ames. Toward the end of the 1930s, she began to use Scribner Ames for professional purposes and thereafter was sometimes called by that name and sometimes by her full birth name, Polly Scribner Ames.
