= Claudine K. Brown =

American museum director and educator and nonprofit executive

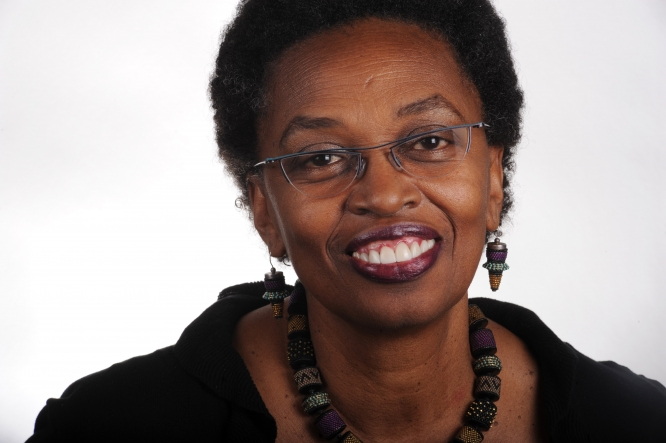
- Born: August 7, 1949
- Died: March 17, 2016 (aged 67)
- Education: Pratt Institute, Bank Street College of Education, Brooklyn College
- Known for: Brooklyn Museum, Deputy Assistant Secretary at the Smithsonian Institution, Director of the Nathan Cummings Foundation; Director of Education, Smithsonian Institution

Claudine K. Brown (1949 – March 17, 2016) was an American museum director and educator and nonprofit executive. She was best known for her work at the Smithsonian Institution, where she was Director of Education, responsible for directing its work to help educate K-12 students. She was also a specialist in African-American history.

== Career ==
Brown began her museum career as an educator in 1977 at the Brooklyn Museum, thanks to arts employment under the Comprehensive Employment and Training Act (CETA), which supported many cultural institutions. She advanced to become "manager of school and community programs (1982-1984), and then assistant director for government and community relations (1985-1990) for that institution," then becoming Deputy Assistant Secretary at the Smithsonian. She left the Smithsonian following the mid-1990s failure of a project to establish a National Museum of African American History as a result of political opposition led by Jesse Helms.

Between her posts at the Smithsonian, Ms. Brown held the office of Director of the Arts and Culture Program at the Nathan Cummings Foundation. The foundation's president, Lance Lindblom wrote that her work as a grantmaker particularly involved the relationship between art and social justice.

At the Smithsonian, Brown served as the first Director for Education, with the formal title of Assistant Secretary for Education and Access. In her previous tenure at the Smithsonian during the 1990s, Ms. Brown had worked at the Smithsonian as director of the National African-American Museum Project, which was to become the National Museum of African American History and Culture, and became the Deputy Assistant Secretary for the Arts and Humanities for the Institution.

Brown shared her career perspective in a 2011 panel session entitled "Access and Inclusivity in the Museum".

== Education ==
Brown was an artist, museum educator, and lawyer, being an alumna of the Pratt Institute (Bachelor of Arts), Bank Street Graduate School of Education (Master of Science in education) and Brooklyn Law School (Juris Doctor).

Brown extended her professional work to mentor others in various capacities, teaching, advising and serving on boards of many organizations. She taught in the Leadership in Museum Education Program at Bank Street Graduate School of Education. She served on the boards of American Association of Museums, Bank Street College of Education, the National Park Service Fund, the Association of Black Foundation Executives, and the Open Society Foundations.

She continued to mentor artists and those in the humanities, to help artists and educators connect to constituent communities and policy makers.
