= Van Meter Ames =

Professor of philosophy (1898–1895)

- Born: July 9, 1898; De Soto, Iowa, U.S.
- Died: November 9, 1985 (aged 87); Cincinnati, Ohio, U.S.
- Spouse: Betty Breneman
- Children: 3
- Parent(s): Edward Scribner Ames (father); Mabel Van Meter Ames (mother)
- Relatives: Scribner Ames (sister)

Academic background
- Education: University of Chicago (AB, PhD)
- Thesis: The Aesthetics of the Novel (1924)

Academic work
- Discipline: Aesthetics
- Institutions: University of Cincinnati; Cornell University; University of Texas; Columbia University

Van Meter Ames (July 9, 1898 – November 9, 1985) was an American academic and educator who served as a professor of philosophy at the University of Cincinnati. From 1959 until 1966, he was the head of the university's philosophy department. In 1976, the American Humanist Association designated him as a fellow for "outstanding contributions to humanist thought in ethics and aesthetics".

Ames was a founding member of the American Society for Aesthetics, serving as its president from 1961 to 1962. He had also served as the president of the American Philosophical Association's Western Division from 1959 to 1960. In 1965, Ames contributed to the Congressional bill that established the National Foundation for the Endowment of the Arts and Humanities and was a member of its founding national committee.

== Early life and education ==
Ames was born on July 9, 1898, in De Soto, Iowa. His father, the theologian and pastor Edward Scribner Ames, had served as the chairman of the philosophy department at the University of Chicago and championed the philosophy of the Chicago school. After the family moved to Chicago, Ames went on to the University of Chicago, where he completed his PhD in philosophy with his dissertation, The Aesthetics of the Novel, in 1924.

== Awards and honors ==
In 1948, Ames was granted a Rockefeller grant to study philosophy in France. From 1958 until 1959, a Fulbright scholarship enabled him to study as a research professor at Komazawa University in Japan.

In 1976, the American Humanist Association designated him as a humanist fellow for outstanding contributions to humanist thought in ethics and aesthetics.

== Personal life ==
Ames was married to Betty Breneman, with whom he had three children: Sanford Scribner Ames, Damaris Ames, and Christine Ames Cornish.

== Selected works ==
- Ames, Van Meter (1924). The Aesthetics of the Novel. Chicago, Illinois: University of Chicago Press.
