= City and Country School =

- (C&C)
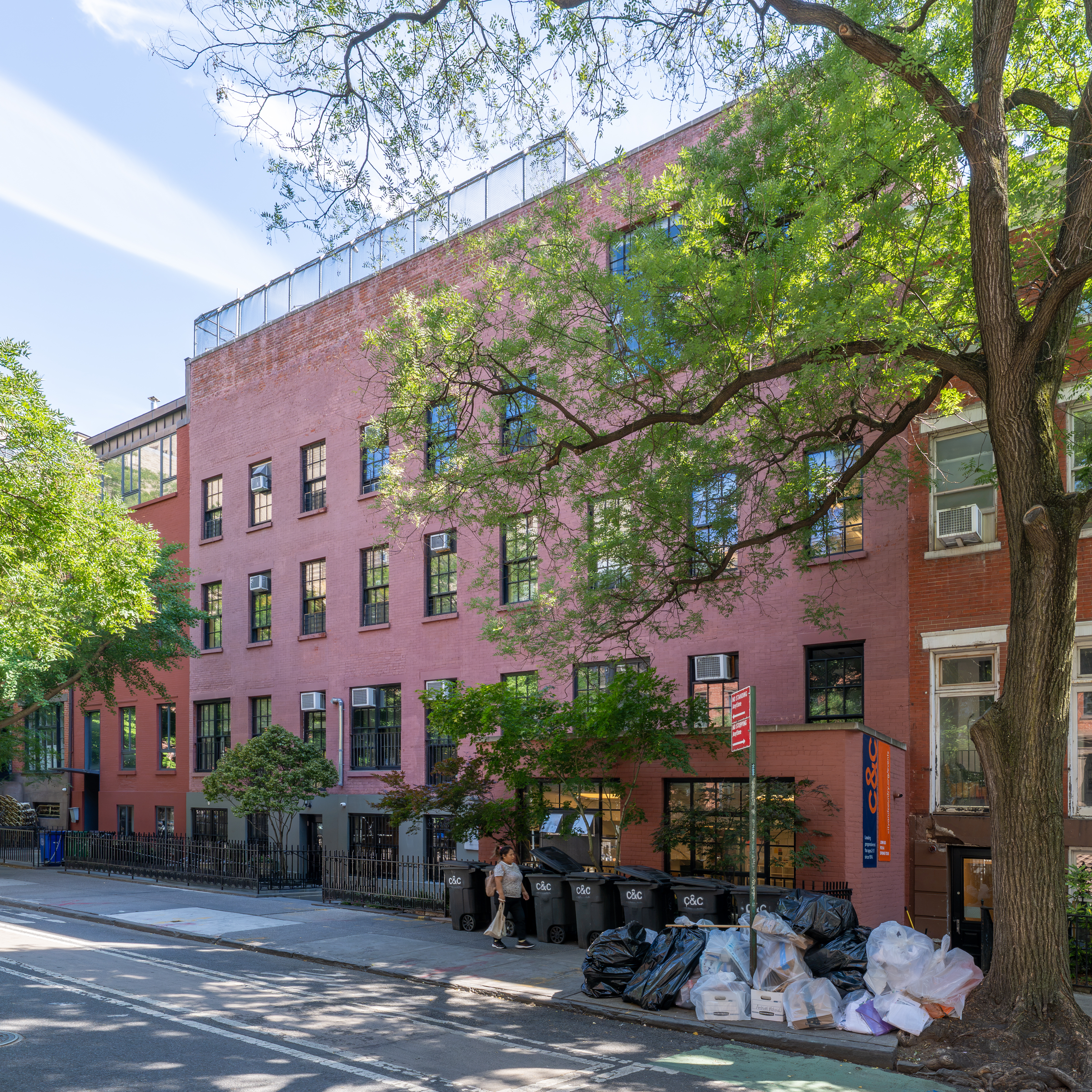
- City and Country School (2026)

Location
- 146 West 13th Street between 6th and 7th Ave; New York City; United States

Information
- Type: Independent, Coeducational
- Established: 1914
- Founder: Caroline Pratt
- Principal: Frank Patti
- Faculty: 44
- Teaching staff: approx. 40
- Grades: N–8
- Enrollment: approx. 360
- Campus: Urban
- Colors: Navy blue and white
- Accreditation: NAIS, NYSAIS
- Affiliation: NAIS, NYSAIS, Interschool
- Website: www.cityandcountry.org

City and Country School is a progressive independent preschool, elementary school and middle school for children aged 2–14 that is located in the Greenwich Village section of New York City.

== Founding ==
City and Country School was founded by Caroline Pratt in 1914. Originally named the Play School, it occupied a three-room apartment at the corner of 4th and 12th Streets. Soon after, Lucy Sprague Mitchell joined Pratt, and offered financial and teaching support that allowed for larger quarters on MacDougal Alley.

Mitchell and colleague Harriet Johnson founded the Bureau of Educational Experiments (BEE) with the purpose of documenting the developmental and learning processes of children in order to gain accurate information about the methods of progressive schools and the abilities and needs of children. The laboratory schools for BEE observation were a nursery school, overseen by Johnson, and the Play School (its name was changed to City and Country School in 1921). As the school grew, City and Country moved to buildings purchased by Mitchell, which were later sold to the school when the BEE and C&C formally parted ways, on West 12th and 13th Streets, where it remains today, although the school's main entrance was on 12th Street until 1984.

== History ==
"A goodly floor space, basic materials for play, and many children using them together" were the elements of a new kind of democratic education for children that guided Caroline Pratt to begin the City and Country School in 1914. Experiences teaching in a small independent school and two settlement houses had left Pratt questioning the value of an education in which "none of these children made any use of what they had learned." In contrast to her frustration was Pratt's observation of the meaningful world created by the young child of a friend while constructing a miniature railroad on the floor of his room. This child was not only enjoying himself, but he was also making sense of the world around him. Pratt discovered for herself the educational value of play.

Her ideas about how children learn, combined with her own woodworking skills, led to Pratt's creation of basic wooden toys and blocks, now known as unit blocks, which were designed to stimulate dramatic play. In the spring of 1913, using the materials she designed, in addition to clay, paper, tempera paint, and crayons, Pratt developed a half-day program for six five-year-olds at the Hartley Settlement House. This successful two-month trial flight convinced her that self-generated and self-directed play do inspire learning.

Encouraged that children can and do learn by play, Pratt, with the assistance of Edna Smith and Helen Marot, colleagues in the Women's Trade Union League, rented a three-room apartment at the corner of West 4th and 12th Streets in Greenwich Village. Six five-year-olds, all from working-class families, attended. The following year, they expanded to larger quarters on West 13th Street. It was at this time that the school received its first recognition in the educational world in Schools of Tomorrow by John and Evelyn Dewey.

It was during the early years on 13th Street that Lucy Sprague Mitchell became interested in the Play School and began a long association with City and Country. Mitchell offered not only financial support and a new home, but also her services and innovative ideas as a teacher. In 1915, the Play School moved to a former stable in MacDougal Alley at the rear of a house at 15 Washington Square North, which had been purchased by Lucy and Wesley Mitchell as a family residence.

During this year Pratt, Mitchell, Marot, and six other women founded the Bureau of School Information. Forthwith, the name of the organization changed to the Bureau of Educational Experiments, which was to be managed cooperatively among a joint faculty for the support and dissemination of information about practical and experimental work in education, among which was Caroline Pratt's Play School.

Through the BEE, the Play School became widely known as a progressive school, though Pratt preferred the term experimental. The name was changed to the City and Country School in 1921 after Pratt and Mitchell established a summer farm program at Hopewell Junction, New York. In addition, the school moved to buildings, purchased by Mitchell, on West 12th and 13th Streets, which the school occupies now.

In 1928, Mitchell left the faculty of City and Country and sold the buildings to the school. She organized what was eventually to be called the Bank Street College of Education. In 1935, City and Country, in conjunction with Bank Street, Little Red Schoolhouse, Walden, Hessian Hills School, and Manumit formed the Associated Experimental Schools to coordinate cooperative buying and fund raising. The organization was abandoned by the end of the 1930s.

Caroline Pratt was Principal of City and Country until she retired in 1945. She continued on as Principal Emerita until her death in 1954.

Among Pratt's many contributions to education were the use of unit blocks in homes and schools the world over. Pratt and C&C also made a significant contribution to public-school education in New York City through the All-Day Neighborhood Schools Program, founded by Adele Franklin, which was modeled on the after-school program at City and Country. For this, Pratt was honored in The Nation magazine's 1939 Roll of Honor.

== Philosophy ==
The school explains its philosophy on its Web site. Distinctives include responsibilities for each group, such as printing and administration, running a store, and helping younger children. Every child also spends 30 minutes of each day reading for pleasure in the library.

== Principals ==
- Caroline Pratt (1914–1944) and emerita (1947–1954)
- Marion Carswell (1945)
- Charlotte Pinco (1946)
- Jean Murray (1948–77)
- Cynthia Beer (1978–79)
- Jane Llewellyn Smith, Director of Education (1980–82)
- Helen Halverson (1983–85)
- Ann & Margaret Halper (1986)
- Janice Miller (1987–88)
- Karen Longo (1988–89)
- Kathleen Holtz (1989–99)
- Kate Turley (1999–2017)
- Scott Moran (2017–2023)
- Frank Patti (2023–present)

== Notable staff ==
- Thomas Hart Benton (art teacher)
- Margaret Bradford Boni, (music teacher, 1928 to 1954)
- Lucy Sprague Mitchell, founder, Bank Street College of Education
- Pete Seeger, folk singer (music teacher, 1949)
- Charles Pollock, painter (art teacher, 1930)
- Jackson Pollock, painter (janitor, 1934)
- William Zorach, artist
- Fola La Follette, women's suffrage and labor activist
- Morris Meister, founder, Bronx High School of Science; first president, Bronx Community College
- Scribner Ames, artist and author of articles on progressive education

== Notable alumni ==
- Felice Aull, Associate Professor of Physiology and Neuroscience at New York University School of Medicine, poet (attended in 1950 and 1951)
- Matthew Broderick, actor, class of 1976
- Griffin Newman, actor and podcaster.
- Ji Chaozhu, former Under-Secretary-General of the United Nations, class of 1944
- Liberty Ellman, jazz guitarist, class of 1985 (attended fall 1981)
- George K. Fraenkel, chemist, class of 1934
- Ruth Stiles Gannett, children's book author, class of 1937
- Dahlov Ipcar, painter, illustrator, and author, class of 1931
- Hilary Knight, illustrator and co-creator of Eloise, class of 1940
- Danny Krivit, DJ, class of 1971
- Alice S. Kandell, Photographer of Nepalese life, class of 1952
- Eric Van Lustbader, author, class of 1960
- Peter Mandel, children's book author, class of 1971
- Reggie Nadelson, novelist, class of 1964
- Vladimir Posner, Russian journalist
- Charles A. Reich, legal and social scholar
- Nicolas Winding Refn, movie director, class of 1985 (attended fall 1981–spring 1983)
- Neo Sora, movie director, class of 2005
- Jeremy Steig, improvising flutist, class of 1956

== Affiliations ==
- National Association of Independent Schools (NAIS)
- New York State Association of Independent Schools (NYSAIS)
- Independent Schools Admissions Association of Greater New York (ISAAGNY)
- Progressive Education Network (PEN)
- Progressive Education Network of New York (PENNY)
- the Guild of Independent Schools
- The Parents League
- Educational Records Bureau (ERB)
- Early Steps
- Prep for Prep
- A Better Chance (ABC)
- Downtown Independent Schools Consortium (DISC)
