= Miller Institute =

University of California Berkeley research institute

Coordinates: 37.867950°N 122.257468°W

- The 6₂ knot known as the Miller Institute knot
- Founders: Adolph C. Miller and Mary Sprague Miller
- Established: 1955

The Miller Institute for Basic Research in Science was established on the University of California, Berkeley, campus in 1955 after Adolph C. Miller and his wife, Mary Sprague Miller, made a donation to the university. It was their wish that the donation be used to establish an institute "dedicated to the encouragement of creative thought and conduct of pure science".

The Miller Institute sponsors Miller Research Professors, Visiting Miller Professors and Miller Research Fellows. The first appointments of Miller Professors were made in January 1957. In 2008, the institute created the Miller Senior Fellow program. This program is aimed differently, but is still within the institute's general purpose of supporting excellence in science at Berkeley. The Senior Fellow advances that goal by providing selected faculty with significant discretionary research funds as recognition of distinction in scientific research. The first five-year award went to Professor Randy Schekman, illustrating the high standard of the Senior Fellows. The 2010 Miller Senior Fellow, Saul Perlmutter, was awarded the Nobel Prize in Physics in 2011. He shares the prize with former Miller Fellow Adam Riess (MF 1996–98) and Brian Schmidt. Randy Schekman was awarded the Nobel Prize in Physiology or Medicine in 2013.

== Miller Research Fellows ==
The Miller Institute invites faculty from around the world to submit nominations for Miller Fellows. Fellowships are intended for exceptional young scientists newly awarded the doctoral degree and are selected on the basis of their academic achievement and the promise of their scientific research. The institute seeks to discover and encourage individuals of outstanding talent, and to provide them with the opportunity to pursue their research on the Berkeley campus. Each Miller Fellow is sponsored by an academic department on the Berkeley campus and performs his or her research in the facilities provided by the host Berkeley faculty member.

== The story of the Miller Institute knot ==
In 1985, Miller Fellow Steven A. Wasserman, his Berkeley faculty host, Nick Cozzarelli, and colleagues published a paper in Science entitled, "Discovery of a predicted DNA knot substantiates a model for site-specific recombination". The paper included an electron micrograph of a single length of double-stranded DNA in a knot with crossing number 6. The DNA was photographed at x40,000 primary magnification.

During a talk by Cozzarelli, Nobel Prize winner, Ilya Prigogine was in the audience. He mentioned that in his private art collection he had a 3rd-century A.D. Roman bas relief which showed the identical knot form described in the paper. A photograph of this bas relief became the cover art for the July 12, 1985 issue of Science.

That same year, the Miller Institute was publishing its 30 Year Report, for which Executive Director Robert Ornduff used the knot for its cover. The image was not used again until the early 1990s, when it was rediscovered among many potential logo options and was selected to thereafter be used as the Miller Institute's logo.
