= Shael Polakow-Suransky =

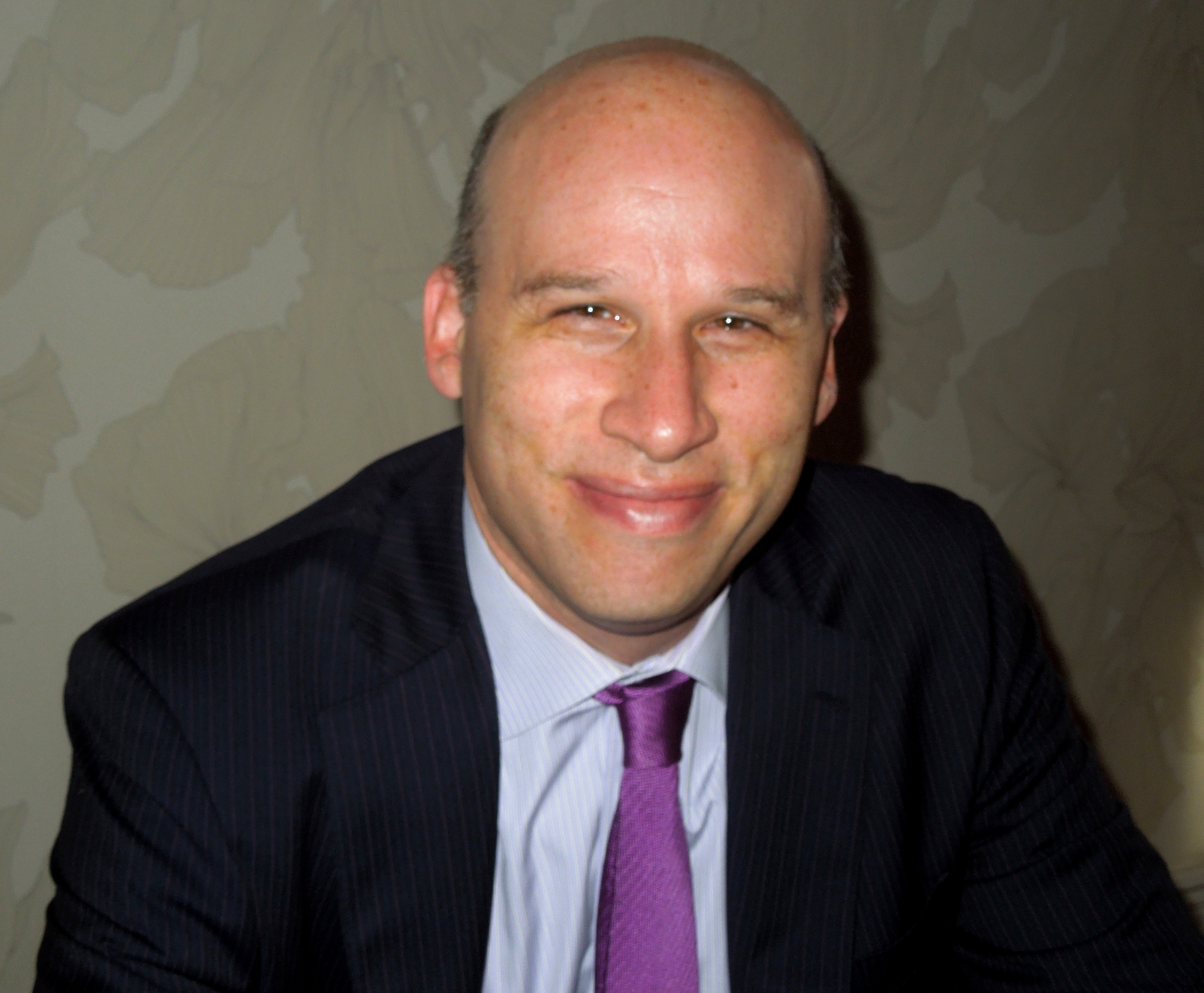

8th President of Bank Street College of Education
- Incumbent
- Assumed office July 1, 2014
- Preceded by: Elizabeth Dickey

Personal details
- Born: January 10, 1972 (age 54) Witbank, South Africa
- Education: Brown University, Bank Street College of Education

Shael Polakow-Suransky (born January 10, 1972) is the president of the Bank Street College of Education. Previously, he was the New York City Department of Education Chief Academic Officer and Senior Deputy Chancellor.

== Early life and education ==
Shael Polakow-Suransky was born January 10, 1972 in Witbank, South Africa, where his Jewish parents, Valerie Polakow and Leonard Suransky, were anti-apartheid activists.

In 1973, the family emigrated to the United States, settling in Michigan, where Shael's younger brother, journalist Sasha Polakow-Suransky, was born in 1979. Shael attended Ann Arbor's alternative Community High School. While in high school, he paired his fellow students with younger children in a peer education program that promoted conversations about tolerance; the program took hold and spread throughout the school district. He spent his senior year conducting an independent study in Durban, South Africa, at the height of the anti-Apartheid movement.

After returning to the United States, Polakow-Suransky studied education and urban studies at Brown University. He then earned a master's degree in educational leadership from Bank Street College of Education, and graduated from the Broad Superintendents Academy in 2008.

== Career as a New York City educator ==
In 1994, Polakow-Suransky began teaching math and social studies at Crossroads Middle School in Harlem. After three years, he became the founding math teacher and eventually assistant principal at Bread and Roses Integrated Arts High School, which combined foci on arts and social justice in its curriculum.

Inspired by New York City's small schools movement and aware of the added struggles that English language learners face, Polakow-Suransky founded a new, small school, Bronx International High School, in 2001. In order to be admitted to the school, students had to fail the City's English language assessment and had to be recent immigrants to the United States. The school was specifically designed to support language development and literacy for a population of students historically neglected by New York's large comprehensive high schools. He also drew inspiration from educators who worked with similar student populations; in a 2001 book review of Vito Perrone's Teacher with a Heart: Reflections on Leonard Covello and Community, Polakow-Suransky writes that "the task of rebuilding school communities that can support students and one day extend beyond into the community is formidable" but that he was driven by "a sense of possibility."

In 2004, Polakow-Suransky joined the central office at the Department of Education. He first served as Deputy CEO for the Office of New Schools. The new small schools are earning success with some of the student groups who have historically been most at-risk. A 2013 study by the nonpartisan research firm MDRC found that small schools, "which serve mostly disadvantaged students of color," achieve graduation rates 9.5 percentage points higher than other schools who serve comparable students and lead to higher college readiness rates.

Polakow-Suransky later became the Deputy Chancellor for Performance and Accountability. As the Department of Education shifted its focus to accountability, he launched a program called Design Your Own Assessment, which ultimately involved more than 200 schools, to create innovative teacher designed formative assessments as an alternative to the City's standardized periodic assessments.

In 2011, he was appointed Chief Academic Officer and Senior Deputy Chancellor. In this role, he oversaw the Division of Academics, Performance, and Support, which had over 1,280 employees and an annual budget of $400 million. The division was responsible for providing instructional resources, support, and supervision for New York City's 1600+ schools. During his tenure as Chief Academic Officer, Polakow-Suransky focused on building schools' capacity to strengthen what Richard Elmore calls the "instructional core," or "the relationship between teachers and students in the presence of content". Polakow-Suransky led the City's work around increasing college and career readiness rates, including through new accountability measures.

== Presidency at Bank Street College of Education ==
On Tuesday, January 21, 2014, Polakow-Suransky announced that he would depart the New York City Department of Education to become the president of Bank Street College of Education, his alma mater. He is the first alumnus of Bank Street to serve as its president. In October 2014, he and a professor at the college, Nancy Nager, penned an opinion piece in The New York Times on the importance of meaningful play in pre-K classrooms as a foundation for successful life-long learning. In May 2015, he was elected to the Board of Directors of PENCIL, an education nonprofit that unites businesses with New York City public schools for the creation of beneficial programs and initiatives.
