= George K. Fraenkel =

American chemist

- Born: July 27, 1921; Deal, New Jersey
- Died: June 10, 2009 (aged 87); New York City
- Education: Harvard, Cornell
- Occupation: Professor of Chemistry
- Years active: 1949–1991
- Employer: Columbia University
- Known for: electron spin resonance
- Spouse: Eva Stolz Gilleran Cantwell
- Awards: Officer dans l’Ordre des Palmes Academiques

George K. Fraenkel (July 27, 1921 – June 10, 2009) was an American physical chemist, dean of Graduate School of Arts and Sciences and chairman of the chemistry department at Columbia University. Fraenkel was noted for his research of electron spin resonance. He also pioneered in the use of electronic techniques to study structures of molecules.

== Biography ==
=== Background ===
Fraenkel was born on July 27, 1921, in Deal, New Jersey. He grew up in Scarsdale, New York.

=== Education ===
In 1942, he graduated magna cum laude and Phi Beta Kappa from Harvard. During World War II, he was hired by the National Defense Research Committee. After the war, he graduated Cornell with a doctorate in 1949.

=== Career ===
Fraenkel joined Columbia's chemistry department in 1949. He served as the department's chair from 1965 to 1968. From 1968 to 1983, he served as dean of graduate school of arts and science. In 1971, Fraenkel oversaw the closure of the linguistics program at Columbia, under his recommendations.

In 1983, he became a vice president for special projects. From 1986 to 1991, he returned to the chemistry department. He retired in 1991 as Higgins Professor Emeritus and dean emeritus.

=== Retirement ===
At the time of his death, he also served as director and treasurer of the Atran Foundation in New York City.

=== Private life and death ===
Fraenkel died in Manhattan on June 10, 2009, aged 87. Surviving him were his wife, Eva Stolz Gilleran Cantwell and six stepchildren.

== Awards ==
In 1972, Fraenkel received the Harold C. Urey Award of the Gamma Chapter of Phi Lambda Upsilon.

In 1981, he received the Title of Officer dans l’Ordre des Palmes Academiques (1981).

== Contributions ==
Fraenkel developed instruments to "track the spin of electrons and thereby obtain information on very small structures," according to an obituary in The New York Times. "We are now determining the structure and function of medically important proteins implicated in Parkinson's disease, how viral proteins insert themselves into cells, medical imaging, memory function and quantum computing," said Jack H. Freed, professor of physical chemistry at Cornell, in reference to developments based on Fraenkel's work.
