= American Society for Aesthetics =

- Established: 1942
- Founder: Van Meter Ames
- President: Paul C. Taylor
- Website: aesthetics-online.org

American Society for Aesthetics (ASA) is a philosophical organization founded in 1942 to promote the study of aesthetics. The ASA sponsors national and regional conferences, and publishes the Journal of Aesthetics and Art Criticism, the American Society for Aesthetics Graduate Ejournal, and the ASA Newsletter. The organization also funds various projects.

== Awards ==
- biennial John Fisher Memorial Prize in Aesthetics to an original essay in aesthetics
- Monograph Prize for an outstanding monograph in the philosophy of art or aesthetics
- Ted Cohen Prize (to honor Ted Cohen), founded in 2014
