= Caroline Pratt (educator) =

American educator

- Caroline Pratt at her desk. Photographer and date unknown, perhaps mid-1920s.
- Born: May 13, 1867; Fayetteville, New York, New York
- Died: June 6, 1954 (aged 87); New York, New York, USA
- Education: Teachers College, Columbia University, Bachelor of Pedagogy, 1892–1894
- Occupations: founder, City and Country School; educator
- Parent(s): Henry Pratt; Lydia (Rowley) Pratt
- Relatives: Elizabeth Sophia (sister), John Davis (brother), Henry Rowley (brother), Helen Marot (companion)

Caroline Pratt (May 13, 1867 – June 6, 1954 ) was an American social thinker and progressive educational reformer whose ideas were influential in educational reform, policy, and practice.

Pratt is known as the founder of City and Country School in the Greenwich Village section of the borough of Manhattan in New York City; the inventor of unit blocks; and as the author of I Learn from Children (HarperCollins, 1948; rereleased in 1990; republished by Grove Atlantic in May 2014; released as a free audiobook in 2018 through Audible), an autobiographical account of her life and educational experiments, philosophies and practices. Pratt's specific style of progressive education, focused on first-hand experiences, open-ended materials, and social studies, has been cited and described by figures as noted as John Dewey and the architect and playground designer David Rockwell. Her original vision endures at City and Country School, which she founded in 1914 in the Greenwich Village section of New York City.

== Life and works ==
Pratt was born in Fayetteville, New York, on May 13, 1867. Her formal primary education was conventional, but her experiences of active, independent play with friends in Fayetteville's rural setting were to be more influential in her work. .

After graduating high school on June 24, 1886, she spent a year caring for her sick father at home. In the fall of 1887 she was asked to accept a position teaching first grade in the village school. She held this job until the fall semester of 1892, at which point she moved to New York City and enrolled in Teachers College. Although she began by studying kindergarten, she turned her attention toward earning a certificate from the Manual Training Shop, eventually earning a bachelor of pedagogy and a position teaching manual training to future teachers at the Philadelphia Normal School in 1894.

Pratt joined the Philadelphia Normal School for Girls only six months before its manual training program's inception. She was a special instructor in woodworking, training teachers to be proficient in skills such as gauging, squaring, sawing, chiseling, planning and boring, doweling, and chamfering. Pratt's understanding of the relationship between hands-on learning and other subjects in a school's curriculum would be evident throughout her career.

Pratt had a commitment to lifelong learning. In Philadelphia, she met Helen Marot, a feminist, social investigator, and writer. Marot founded a small library called the Library of Economic and Political Science, in which liberals and radicals would congregate and exchange ideas, where Pratt absorbed the spirit of progressivism. Pratt and Marot moved from Philadelphia to New York City in 1901. In New York, Pratt and Marot lived in Greenwich Village, where the Association of Neighborhood Workers of New York City hired Marot, and Pratt worked various jobs teaching manual training and carpentry. They lived together as life partners until 1940, when Marot died from a sudden heart attack.

Caroline Pratt is featured in the American artist Thomas Hart Benton’s mural America Today in the panel "City Activities with Dance Hall."

== Do-With Toys ==
Upon her first observations of children recreating their worlds through play, Pratt wished to provide tools for children to expand on this natural activity. Around 1911, she devised a line of toys, Do-With Toys, for children to dramatize their observations and construct their knowledge through play. The toys comprised simple people, animals, and furniture, to be used in open-ended contexts as devised by the child.

== City and Country School ==
In 1913, Caroline Pratt enacted a two-month experiment with young children from Greenwich Village. In this setting, the children were free to use materials to construct their knowledge about the world, using Pratt's unique designs for hand-made unit blocks. This experiment led to her launching the Play School, which embodied a child-centered approach to education. with a strong emphasis on community as children worked together to reconstruct their experiences through play. The curriculum was drawn from the children's environment: observations about the neighborhood, for example, would inspire children to reflect on their world directly so that they could make sense of their experiences. With the support from the Bureau of Educational Experiments, now known as Bank Street College of Education, the Play School expanded to brownstones on West 13th and 12th Streets, where it remains today, and was renamed the City and Country School. (See City and Country School for full history and contemporary profile.)

Under her leadership, the City and Country School developed an open-ended approach to teaching and learning that led to the design of several well-known programs. The Blocks Program, the Jobs Program, Rhythms, and a social-studies core curriculum were all (and continue to be) hallmarks of the school. Unit blocks continue to be used in classrooms and homes the world over, and C&C is well known for its commitment to progressive practices and hosts numerous visitors, researchers, and education experts to the present day.

She was Principal of the City and Country School until she retired in 1945. She continued on as Principal Emerita until her death on June 6, 1954.

== See also ==
- Helen Marot
