= Adolph C. Miller =

American economist and government official (1866–1953)

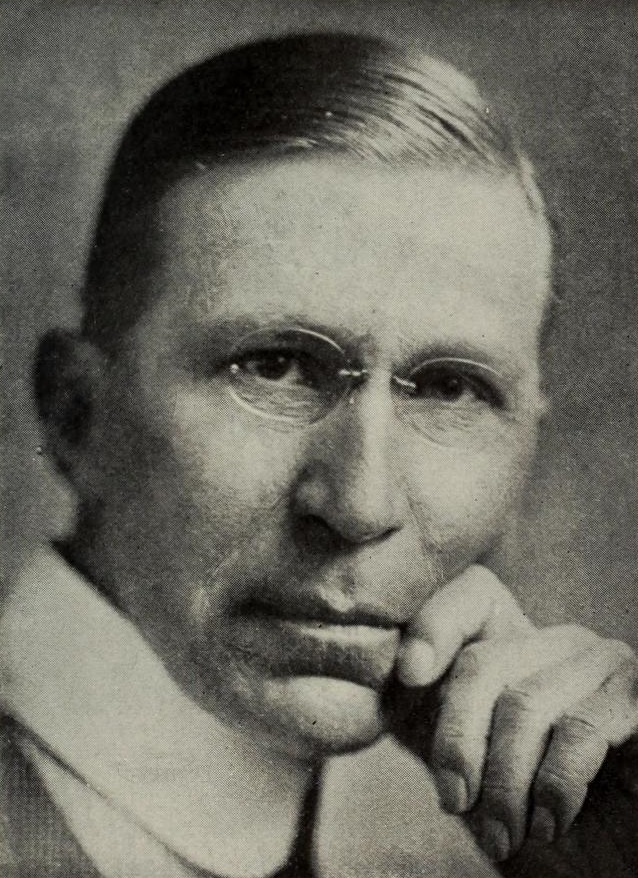

Member of the Federal Reserve Board
- In office August 10, 1914 – February 3, 1936
- President: Woodrow Wilson; Warren G. Harding; Calvin Coolidge; Herbert Hoover; Franklin D. Roosevelt
- Preceded by: Position established
- Succeeded by: John McKee

Personal details
- Born: January 6, 1866 San Francisco, California, U.S.
- Died: February 11, 1953 (aged 87) Washington, D.C., U.S.
- Party: Independent
- Education: University of California, Berkeley (BA); Harvard University (MA)

Adolph C. Miller (January 7, 1866 - February 11, 1953) was an American economist who served as a member of the Federal Reserve Board from 1914 to 1936. Miller was a notable benefactor of the University of California, Berkeley, where he was a graduate and professor of economics.

== Early life ==
Miller was born in San Francisco on January 7, 1866. After receiving his degree from the University of California, he studied abroad in Paris and Munich. Miller served as an instructor at Harvard University and then spent one year each as an assistant professor at his alma mater and Cornell University before being hired as a full professor of finance at the University of Chicago. While in Chicago, in 1895, Miller married Mary Sprague, daughter of a prominent Chicago businessman.

== University and political career ==
In 1902, Benjamin Wheeler, President of the University of California, persuaded Miller to return to Berkeley as Flood Professor of Finance and take charge of the College of Commerce, the predecessor of today's Haas School of Business. Miller remained there until 1913. In that year, Miller's classmate and friend, Franklin Knight Lane, was appointed Secretary of the Interior by Woodrow Wilson, and Lane persuaded Miller to come to Washington to serve as Assistant Secretary. In May 1913, Miller was also appointed as Director of the Bureau of National Parks.

In 1914, Miller was appointed one of the original members of the Federal Reserve Board, which had been enacted late the previous year. The terms of the initial members were staggered, and Miller received the longest initial term, ten years. Miller was the sole economist on the Board during World War I, and he supported policies which would reduce spending by the public, principally through higher taxes.

He served 22 years in that capacity before retiring in 1936. He remained a significant benefactor to the University of California, and its Miller Institute for Basic Research in Science was endowed with money left to the university and named for him.

His house in the Kalorama neighborhood of Washington DC, designed in 1924 by Baltimore architect Hall Pleasants Pennington, still stands at 2230 S Street NW.

== Bibliography ==
- Wells, Donald (2004), The Federal Reserve System, McFarland, ISBN 0-7864-1880-X

Government offices
New office	Member of the Federal Reserve Board; 1914–1936	Succeeded by John McKee
