= Sasha Polakow-Suransky =

American journalist and author (born 1979)

- Born: April 3, 1979 (age 47); United States
- Education: Brown University; Oxford University
- Occupation: Investigative journalist

Sasha Polakow-Suransky (born April 3, 1979) is an American journalist and author. He is currently executive opinion editor at the Financial Times. From 2017-early 2025, he was a deputy editor of Foreign Policy, and before that editor of international opinion at The New York Times op-ed page and a former senior editor of Foreign Affairs.

In 2015 he was an Open Society Fellow, while writing a book about the political impact of immigration. His first book, The Unspoken Alliance: Israel's Secret Relationship with Apartheid South Africa, was published in 2010. His second book, Go Back to Where You Came From: The Backlash Against Immigration and the Fate of Western Democracy, was published in 2017.

== Life ==
After graduating from Brown University, where he wrote for The College Hill Independent, Polakow-Suransky was awarded a Rhodes Scholarship and attended Oxford University, where he earned a doctorate in modern history.

He is the younger brother of Shael Polakow-Suransky; both are the children of Valerie Polakow and Leonard Suransky, South African Jews who were anti-apartheid activists in South Africa before emigrating to the United States in 1973 to avoid possible arrest.

== Works ==
- The Unspoken Alliance: Israel's Secret Relationship with Apartheid South Africa, Pantheon, 2010. ISBN 9780307388506, OCLC 800904318
- Go Back to Where You Came From: The Backlash Against Immigration and the Fate of Western Democracy, Nation Books, 2017. ISBN 9781568585925, OCLC 972386398
