= Reggie Nadelson =

American novelist

Reggie Nadelson is an American novelist, known for writing mystery novels.

== Early life ==
She was born and raised in Greenwich Village in Manhattan, New York. After graduating from City and Country School and Elisabeth Irwin High School in Greenwich Village, she majored in English at Vassar College, and then earned a graduate degree in journalism at Stanford. Nadelson was raised in a secular Jewish family and describes herself as such today. She has reported on secular Jewish culture in America for the BBC radio show, From Our Own Correspondent.

== Career ==
She migrated to London for The Guardian newspaper, and subsequently The Independent. She also began writing documentaries for the BBC. She has also contributed to the United States magazine Vogue, as well as several other London-based newspapers and magazines.

In 1995, she created Artie Cohen, a Russian-born, New York City cop around whom most of her novels would be based.

Tom Hanks has optioned Nadelson's Dean Reed biography Comrade Rockstar and is planning to produce a movie on Reed's life.

== Personal life ==
She spends her time living in both Manhattan and London.

== Bibliography ==
=== The Artie Cohen series ===
- 1995 Red Mercury Blues (also published as Red Hot Blues)
- 1997 Hot Poppies
- 1999 Bloody London
- 2002 Sex Dolls (also published as Skin Trade)
- 2004 Disturbed Earth
- 2005 Red Hook
- 2006 Fresh Kills
- 2009 Londongrad
- 2010 Blood Count

== Other novels ==
- Somebody Else (2003)
- Manhattan 62 (2014)

== Non-fiction ==
- Who is Angela Davis?: The Biography of a Revolutionary (1972) See Angela Davis.
- Comrade Rockstar (1991) (also published as Comrade Rockstar: The Life and Mystery of Dean Reed, the All-American Boy Who Brought Rock 'N' Roll to the Soviet Union)
- At Balthazar: The New York Brasserie at the Center of the World (2017) See also Balthazar
