= The Journal of Aesthetics and Art Criticism =

American peer-reviewed academic journal

- Discipline: Philosophy
- Language: English
- Edited by: Jonathan Gilmore, Sandra Shapshay

Publication details
- History: 1941–present
- Publisher: Wiley-Blackwell on behalf of the American Society for Aesthetics up to January 2021. From 2021 onwards JAAC is published by Oxford University Press.
- Frequency: Quarterly

Standard abbreviations
- ISO 4: J. Aesthet. Art Crit.

Indexing
- ISSN: 0021-8529 (print); 1540-6245 (web)
- LCCN: a43003205
- JSTOR: 00218529
- OCLC no.: 299335373

Links
- Journal homepage; Pre-2021 online archive

The Journal of Aesthetics and Art Criticism (JAAC) is a quarterly peer-reviewed academic journal covering the study of aesthetics and art criticism.

It was published by Wiley-Blackwell on behalf of the American Society for Aesthetics up to January 2021, when it shifted to Oxford University Press.

== Abstracting and indexing ==
The journal is abstracted and indexed in the Arts and Humanities Citation Index, Scopus, Academic Search Ultimate, IBZ Online, Periodicals Index Online, DIALNET, Art & Architecture Source, Art Abstracts, Film & Television Literature Index, Humanities Abstracts, Humanities Source Ultimate, Index Islamicus, International Bibliography of Theatre & Dance, Music & Performing Arts Collection, Music Index, Music Periodicals Database, Performing Arts Periodicals Database, Art Index, Modern Language Association Database, and Philosopher's Index.

According to the Journal Citation Reports, the journal has a 2025 impact factor of 0.9, ranking it 9th out of 151 journals in the category "ART" and 43rd out of 336 journals in the category “PHILOSOPHY”.
