= Lucy Sprague Mitchell =

American writer (1878–1967)

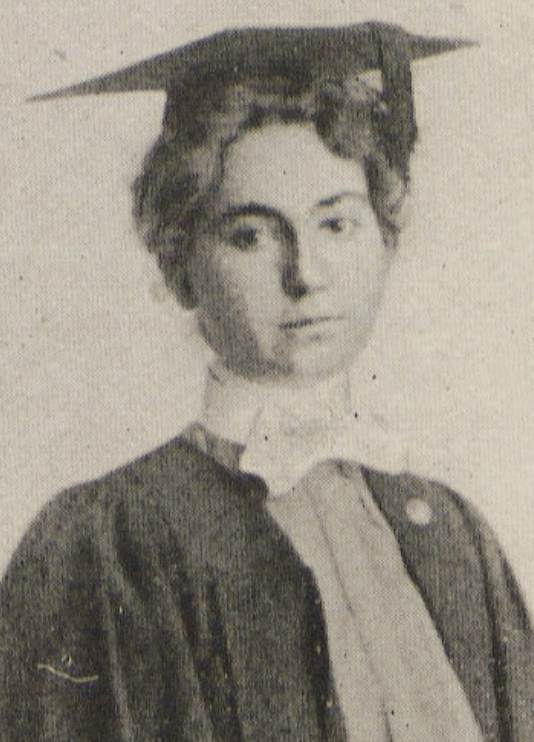
- Lucy Sprague, from the 1900 Radcliffe College yearbook

1st President of Bank Street College of Education
- In office 1916–1955
- Succeeded by: John H. Niemeyer

Personal details
- Born: Lucy Sprague; July 2, 1878 Chicago, Illinois
- Died: October 15, 1967 (aged 89) New York City
- Spouse: Wesley Clair Mitchell
- Relations: Adolph C. Miller (brother-in-law); Elizabeth Sprague Coolidge (cousin)
- Children: 4, including Arnold Mitchell
- Education: Radcliffe College
- Profession: Educator, writer

Lucy Sprague Mitchell (July 2, 1878 – October 15, 1967) was an American educator and children's writer, and the founder of Bank Street College of Education.

== Early life and education ==
Lucy Sprague was born in Chicago, Illinois, the daughter of Otho A. S. Sprague and Lucia Atwood Sprague. Her father was a businessman. She attended Radcliffe College from 1896 to 1900, graduating with honors in philosophy. During her time at Radcliffe College, Mitchell lived with Alice Freeman Palmer and George Herbert Palmer on Quincy Street in Cambridge, Massachusetts. Because of the college's strict codes of gender segregation at the time, Mitchell had to circumvent the all-male Harvard Yard in order to reach Harvard University's Museum of Comparative Zoology, where she worked in the Radcliffe Zoological Laboratory.

Her sister Mary married scientist Adolph C. Miller. Pianist Elizabeth Sprague Coolidge was her first cousin.

== Career ==
Mitchell was the first dean of women at the University of California at Berkeley, where she lectured in the English Department and promoted educational and career opportunities for women students from 1903 to 1912. She was succeeded by her assistant, fellow Radcliffe alumna Lucy Ward Stebbins. In 1916, influenced by the work of John Dewey, Mitchell cofounded the Bureau of Educational Experiments (BEE) in New York City to study and develop optimal learning environments for children. The BEE evolved into the Bank Street College of Education.

Mitchell wrote over twenty books, including North America (1931), Streets: Stories for Children Under Seven (1933), Horses Now and Long Ago (1938), The Here and Now Story Book (1938), See What's in the Grass (1945), Our Children and Our Schools (1950), and Believe and Make Believe (1956). She also wrote a memoir of her marriage, Two Lives: The Story of Wesley Clair Mitchell and Myself (1953).

== Personal life ==
Lucy Sprague married economist Wesley Clair Mitchell in 1912. They raised four children together, including social scientist Arnold Mitchell. W. C. Mitchell died in 1948. Lucy Sprague Mitchell died in 1967, aged 89 years, in Palo Alto, California. Columbia University holds a collection of her papers. Joyce Antler published a book-length biography of Mitchell, Lucy Sprague Mitchell: The Making of a Modern Woman (Yale University Press 1988).
