= Bank Street College of Education =

School in Manhattan, New York

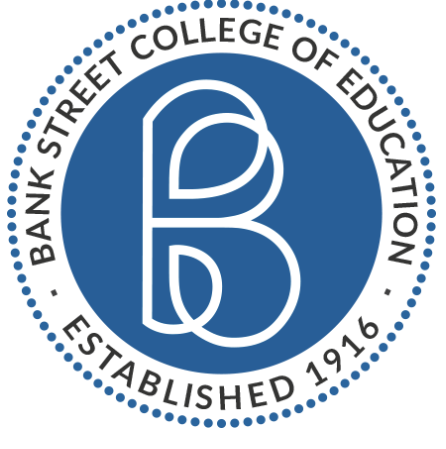
- Former names: Bureau of Educational Experiments, The Cooperative School for Student Teachers
- Type: Teaching school, private school, graduate school, research university, elementary school, preschool
- Established: 1916; 110 years ago
- Founder: Lucy Sprague Mitchell
- Accreditation: Middle States Commission on Higher Education
- Endowment: $49.1 million (2019)
- President: Shael Polakow-Suransky
- Dean of Children's Programs & Head of School: Doug Knecht
- Faculty: 125
- Students: 597 (2023, graduate school); 451 (2025, school for children)
- Location: New York City, New York, United States; 40°48′20″N 73°57′59″W
- Campus: Urban
- Website: www.bankstreet.edu
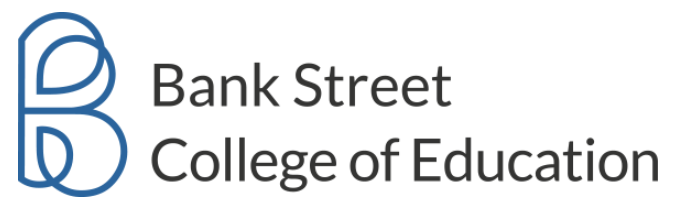

Bank Street College of Education is a private school, graduate school, and education research center located on the Upper West Side of Manhattan. It consists of a graduate-only teacher training college, Bank Street Graduate School of Education, and an independent nursery-through-8th-grade school, the Bank Street School for Children.

== History ==
The origins of the school lie in the Bureau of Educational Experiments, which was established in 1916 by Lucy Sprague Mitchell, her husband Wesley Clair Mitchell, and Harriet Merrill Johnson; Lucy Mitchell's cousin Elizabeth Sprague Coolidge provided financial support. The bureau was intended to foster research into, and development of, experimental and progressive education, and was influenced by the thinking of Edward Thorndike and John Dewey, both of whom Mitchell had studied with at Columbia University. The bureau was run by a council of twelve members, but Mitchell was its most influential figure until the 1950s. The name of the institution derives from its 1930–1971 location at 69 Bank Street in Greenwich Village.

In 1919 the bureau started a nursery school for children from fifteen to thirty-six months old; Harriet Johnson was the director. The school fed into the Play School for three- to seven-year-olds run by Caroline Pratt; eight-year-olds were taught in a special class by members of the bureau.

Bank Street College of Education served as an academic consultant during development for Multiplication Rock, the first series of Schoolhouse Rock!

The College was instrumental in the design of Bank Street Writer, an early microcomputer word processing package originally intended for schoolchildren (albeit with significant popularity among adults as well).

In 1958, the college received a $1,000,000 grant from the Department of Health, Education and Welfare for a five-year study on how schools for younger children could improve mental health development.

== Accreditation ==
Bank Street College of Education serves as the home for both the School for Children and the Graduate School of Education, as well as a partner to schools and communities to advance studies and research in education through Bank Street Education Center and Bank Street Family Center. Since 1960, the school has been accredited by the Middle States Association of Colleges and Schools or its successor the Middle States Commission on Higher Education. Bank Street School for Children is accredited by the New York State Association of Independent Schools.

== Bank Street College of Education ==
Bank Street College of Education is the education and research arm of Bank Street. It began in 1916 as the Bureau of Educational Experiments (BEE) in and was founded by Lucy Sprague Mitchell in New York City. Spearheading research into understanding how children learn and grow, Bank Street developed the Bank Street approach, known as the developmental-interaction approach, an expression of progressive education. In the 1950s, the school changed its name to Bank Street College of Education.

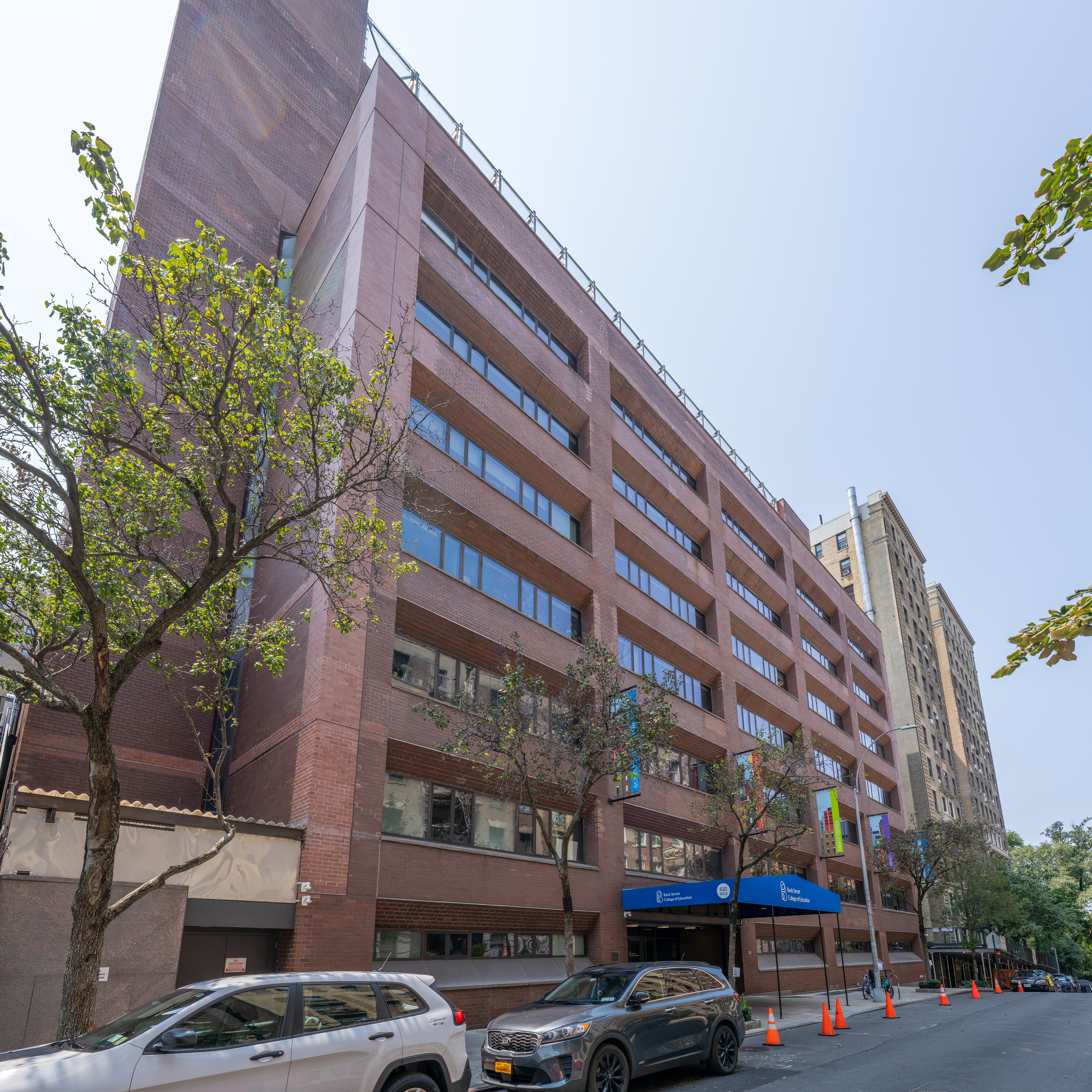
School Building (2026)

=== Bank Street Education Center ===
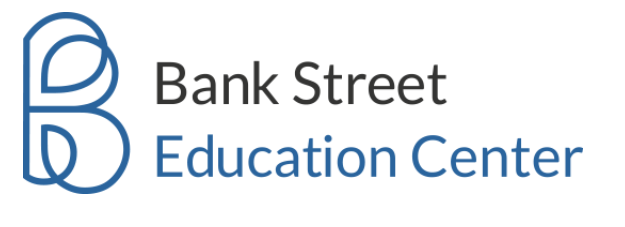
Bank Street Education Center

The Education Center at Bank Street provide various levels of trainings and education to schools and communities across the country with the purpose of making education more equitable.

=== Bank Street School for Children ===
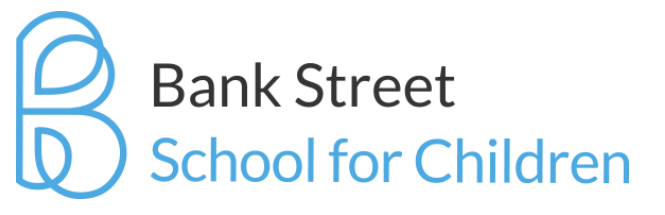
Bank Street School for Children logo

The Bank Street School for Children is a coed private preschool, elementary school, and middle school (PreK-8 school) within the Bank Street College of Education. The school includes children in nursery school through eighth grade. Student to teacher ratio averages around 6:1 with an average class size of 39. As of 2025, tuition ranges from $37,554 – $68,793 per school year. Bank Street School for Children offers various tuition payment options and financial aid, with about 59% of applicants receiving financial aid in an average amount around $21,618. There are approximately 451 children enrolled as students, approximately 43% of whom are students of color (students who are not non-Hispanic white). The instructors are often current or past students of Bank Street's graduate school, which shares a campus with the School for Children—including more than half of the teachers who are alumni.

The School for Children is accredited by the New York State Association of Independent Schools, and is a member of the National Association of Independent Schools.

=== Graduate School of Education ===
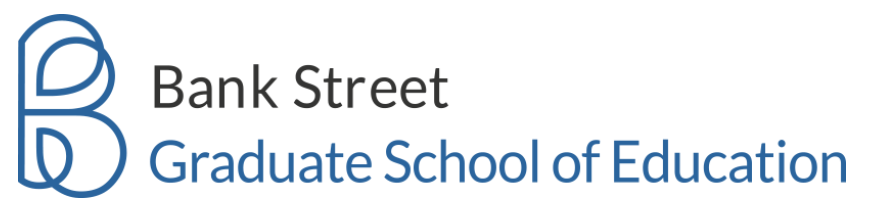
Bank Street Graduate School of Education logo

In the 1930s, Bank Street moved to 69 Bank Street and opened as the Cooperative School for Teachers, a joint venture with other schools with a goal to develop teacher education and training. In the 1950s, the school's name changed from the Cooperative School for Teachers to the Bank Street College of Education, after earning accreditation by the Board of Regents of New York State to award Master of Science degrees.

As of 2024, the graduate school had about 65 full time and 55 part-time faculty and staff and approximately 844 students, of which 87% were female.

=== Bank Street Family Center ===
Bank Street Family Center provides full-day, year-round childcare, preschool, and pre-k options for children between 6 months to five years old.

== Alumni ==
=== Graduate school ===
- Bill Ayers, militant activist and educator
- Lee Bennett Hopkins, educator and writer
- Claudine K. Brown, director at the Smithsonian Institution, museum educator, artist
- Margaret Wise Brown, writer
- Ruth Cohn, psychotherapist, educator, and poet
- Rosina Fernhoff, Obie Award-winning theater actress
- Adam Gidwitz, author
- Robie Harris, children's book author
- Trudie Lamb-Richmond, Schaghticoke Tribal Nation member and educator
- Anne Mitchell, educator
- Shael Polakow-Suransky, current president and former chief academic officer of the New York City Education Department
- Miriam Roth, educator
- Dorothy Stoneman, founder and president of YouthBuild USA
- Ellen Tarry, picture book author
- Edith Thacher Hurd, children's book writer
- Lucy Wainwright Roche, singer-songwriter
- Sara Wilford, philanthropist
- Valerie Wilson Wesley, author and editor
- Diane Wolkstein, New York City official storyteller

=== School for Children ===
- Purva Bedi, actress
- Liz Garbus, filmmaker
- Shuwanza Goff, deputy director of the Office of Legislative Affairs for President Joe Biden
- Zohran Mamdani, politician; mayor of New York City
- Angelica Page, actress and filmmaker
- Ally Sheedy, actress
