= List of toys =

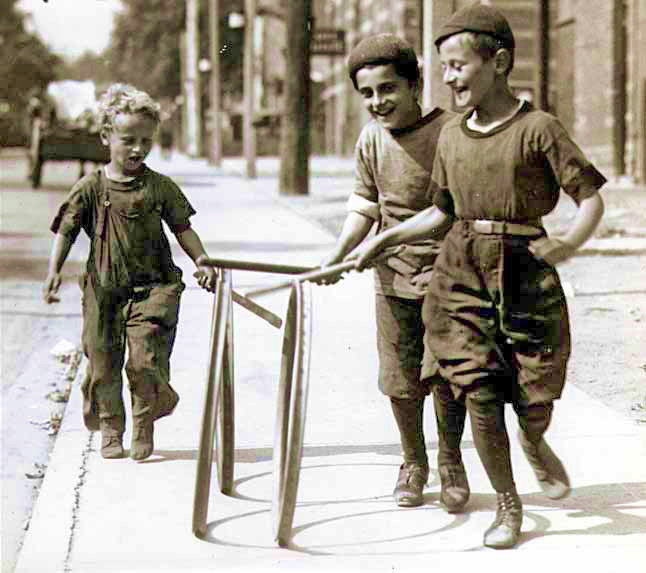
Hoops have been a popular toy across a variety of cultures since antiquity.

This article is a list of toys, toy sets, and toy systems; the toys included are widely popular (either currently or historically) and provide illustrative examples of specific types of toys.

== Action figures ==
- Army men
- B-Daman
- Bakugan
- Bionicle
- Dragon Ball's merchandising
- Evel Knievel Action Figure
- Funko
- G.I. Joe
- Gumby
- He-Man
- Jumping Jack
- Kenner Star Wars action figures
- Lara
- Little People
- Masters of the Universe
- Max Steel
- Monster in My Pocket
- Playmobil
- Pokémon
- Power Rangers
- The Smurfs merchandising
- ThunderCats
- Stretch Armstrong
- Superhero merchandise
- Teenage Mutant Ninja Turtles
- Toy soldier
- Transformers
- Weebles

== Animals ==
- Beanie Babies
- Breyer Animal Creations
- Cymbal-banging monkey toy
- Djungelskog
- Furby
- Hello Kitty's merchandising
- Filly
- Hatchimals
- Ithaca Kitty
- Littlest Pet Shop
- LuLu the Piggy
- My Little Pony
- National Geographic Animal Jam
- Pet Rock
- Puppy in My Pocket
- Rocking horse
- Rubber Duck
- Schleich
- Sock monkey
- Teddy bear
- Tickle Me Elmo
- Stick Horse
- ZhuZhu Pets

== Cars and radio-controlled ==
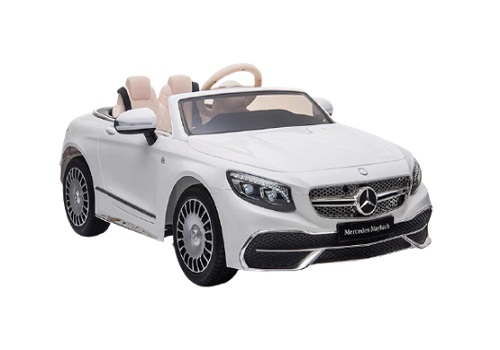
Maybach S650 Children's Electric Car Model - Smart Baby

- Corgi
- Cozy Coupe
- Didicar
- Dinky
- Hot Wheels
- Majorette
- Matchbox
- Power Wheels
- Slot cars
- Tomica
- Tonka

== Construction toys ==
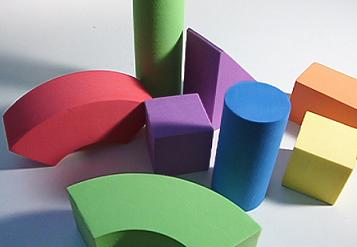
A set of toy blocks

- Erector Set
- K'Nex
- Lego
- Lincoln Logs
- Märklin
- Meccano
- Mega Blocks
- Playmobil
- Rasti
- Rokenbok
- Stickle bricks
- STIKFAS
- Tinkertoy
- Tog'l
- Zaks
- Zome

== Creative toys ==
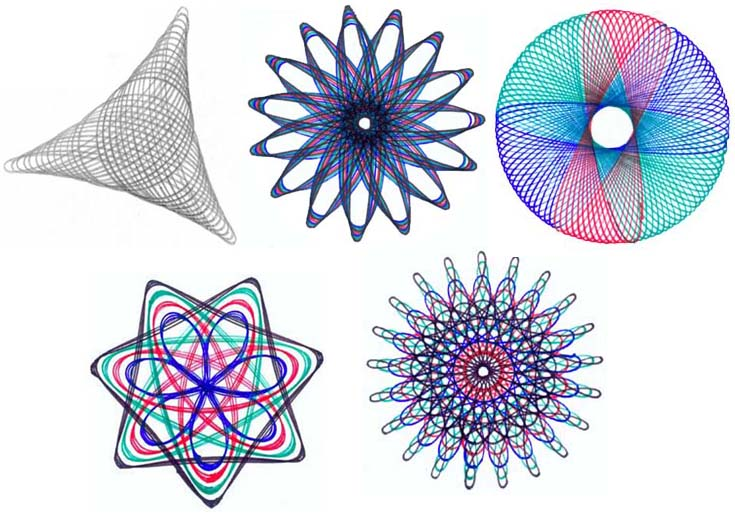
Designs drawn with a spirograph

- Cleversticks
- Coloring book
- Colorforms
- Crayola Crayons
- Creepy Crawlers
- Lego
- Lite-Brite
- Magic Slate
- Magna Doodle
- Magnetic Poetry
- Marble Run
- Mr. Potato Head
- Play-Doh
- Rainbow Loom
- Shrinky Dinks
- Silly Putty
- Spirograph
- Stickers

== Dolls ==
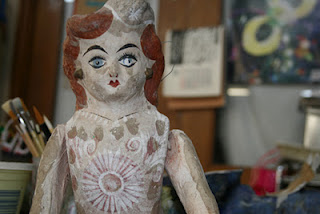
Mexican Lupita doll from the 20th century

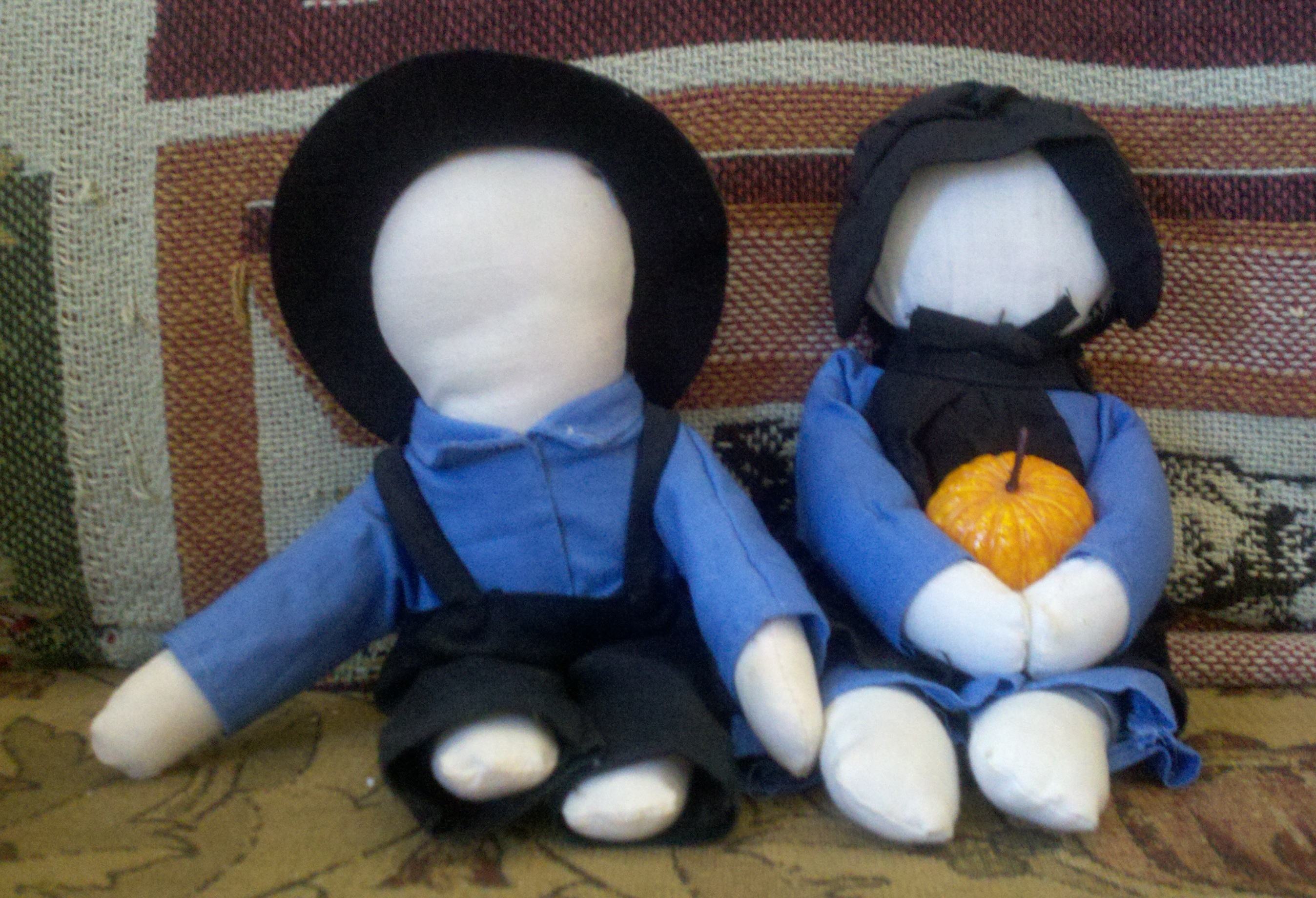
Faceless Amish dolls, a form of American folk art

- African dolls
- American Girl
- Amish doll
- Anatomically correct doll
- Apple doll
- Art doll
- Baby Alive
- Ball-jointed doll
- Barbie
- Betty Spaghetty
- Bisque doll
- Black doll
- Bratz doll
- Cabbage Patch Kids
- Celebrity doll
- Chatty Cathy
- China doll
- Composition doll
- Disney Princess merchandise
- Enchantimals
- Fashion doll
- Frozen Charlotte
- Groovy Girls
- Inuit doll
- Japanese traditional dolls
- Jumping jack (toy)
- Lupita dolls
- Mannequin
- Matryoshka doll
- Monster High
- My Little Pony
- Paper doll
- Parian doll
- Peg wooden doll
- Polly Pocket
- Roly-poly toy
- Raggedy Andy
- Raggedy Ann
- Rag doll
- Reborn doll
- Shopkins
- Strawberry Shortcake
- Stuffed animal
- Tanjore doll
- Tickle Me Elmo
- Topsy-Turvy doll
- Troll doll
- Voodoo doll
- Wind-up toy

== Educational toys ==
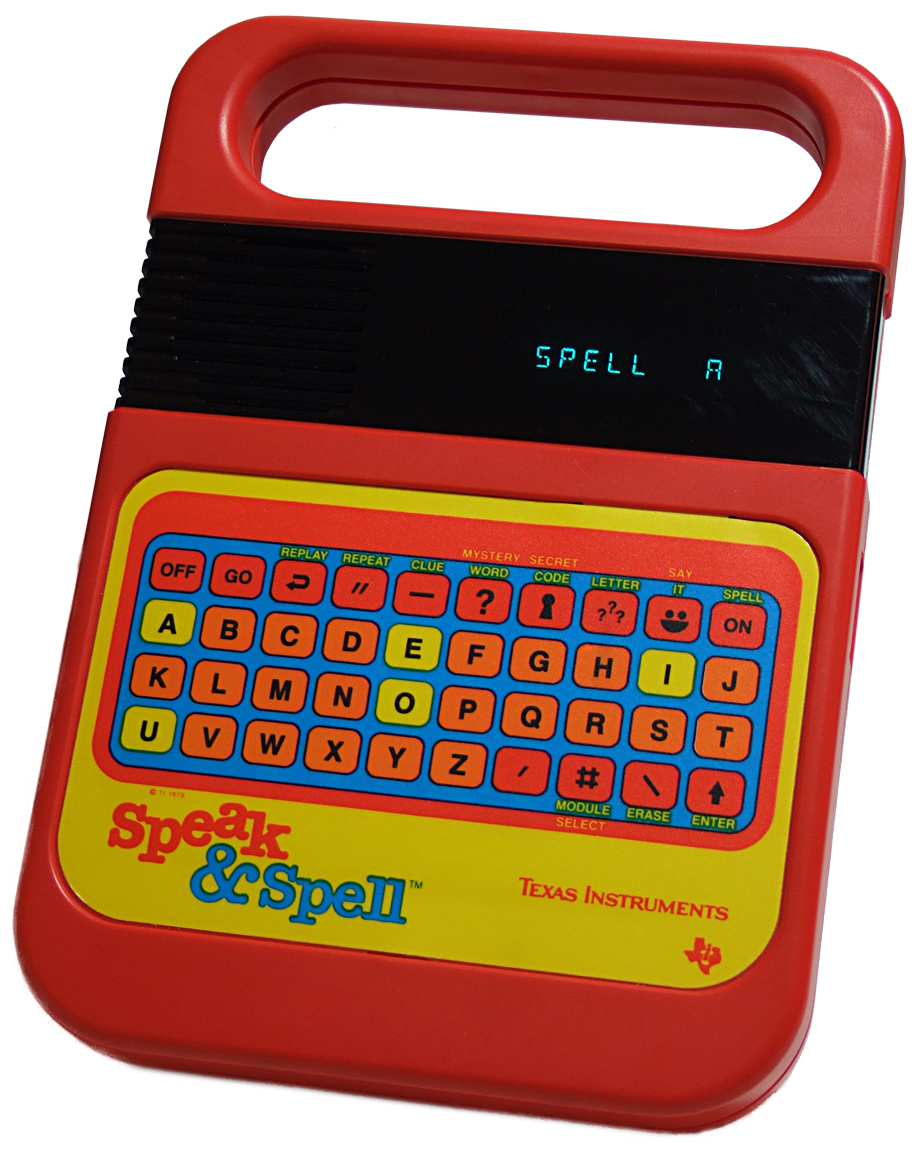
A Speak & Spell

- Ant Farm
- Lego Mindstorms
- Lego Mindstorms NXT
- qfix robot kits
- See 'n Say
- Speak & Spell

== Electronic toys ==
- 20Q
- Amiibo
- Digital pet
- Entertainment robot
- Evilstick
- Furby
- Robot dog
- Robot kit
- USB toy

== Office toys ==
An animation of a Newton's cradle

- Drinking bird
- Fidget Cube
- Fidget Spinner
- Kinetic sand
- Magic 8 Ball
- Newton's cradle
- Pin Art

== Food-related toys ==
- Easy-Bake Oven
- Pez dispenser
- Snow cone machine
- Tea set
- Mini Brands

== Games ==
- Barrel O' Monkeys
- Battleship
- Candy Land
- Chutes and Ladders
- Clue
- Concentration (aka Memory)
- Connect Four
- Crocodile Dentist
- Dominoes
- Dungeons & Dragons
- Gator Golf
- Hungry Hungry Hippos
- Jenga
- Life
- Ludo
- Mad Libs
- Mattel Auto Race
- Monopoly
- Mouse Trap
- Operation
- Pokémon
- Pong
- Pretty Pretty Princess
- Phase 10
- Risk
- Rock 'Em Sock 'Em Robots
- Scrabble
- Simon
- Sorry!
- Tic-tac-toe
- Toss Across
- Trivial Pursuit
- Twister
- Video game consoles
- Video games
- Uno
- Yu-Gi-Oh

== Physical activity and dexterity ==
- Balloon
- BB guns
- Beach Ball
- Bean bag
- Bicycle
- Big Wheel
- Bilibo
- Bop It
- Clackers
- Contact juggling (acrylic ball)
- Corn Popper
- Cozy Coupe
- Devil Sticks (juggling sticks)
- Didicar
- Footbag (dirt bag / hacky sack)
- Frisbee
- Gee-haw whammy diddle
- Hula Hoop
- Jacks
- Juggling clubs
- Jump rope
- Kite
- Laser tag
- Marbles
- Moon shoes
- Nerf
- Paddle ball
- Pogo stick
- Puppet
- Radio Flyer
- Roller Skates
- Scooter
- Skateboard
- Skip It
- Slinky
- Slip 'n Slide
- Soap-box cart
- Space Pets
- Table skittles
- Toy gun
- Water gun
- Wiffle bat and ball

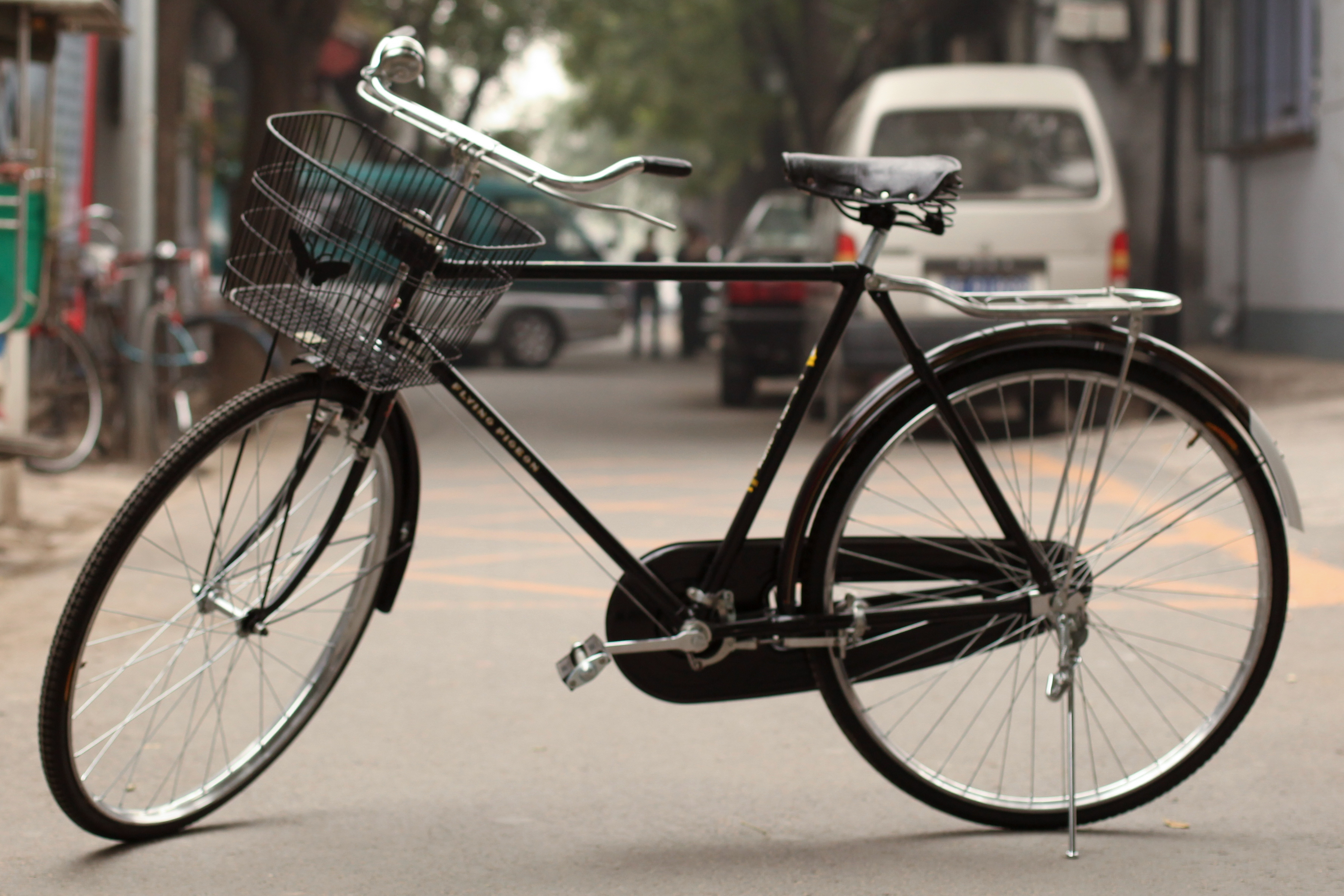
A bicycle

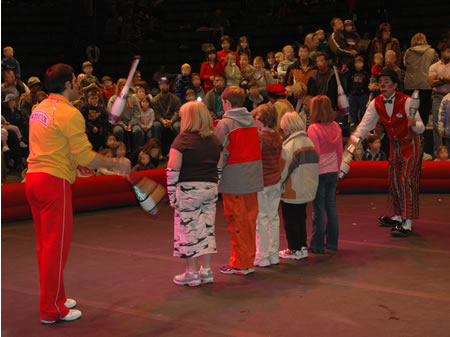
Jugglers juggling at a circus

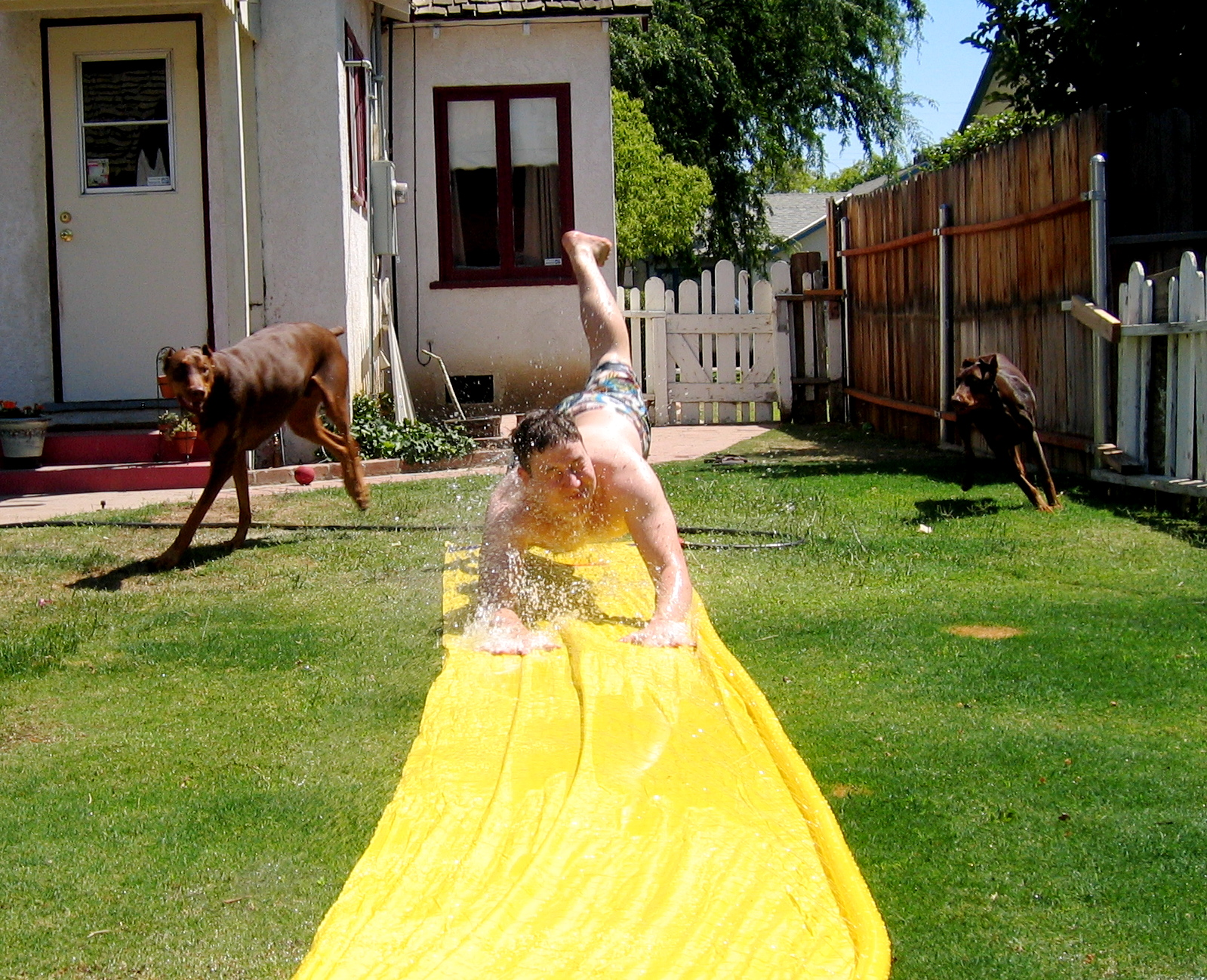
A person sliding onto a Slip 'n Slide

== Playground ==
- Ball pit
- Inflatable
- Jungle gym
- Playground slide

== Puzzle/assembly ==
- Jigsaw puzzle
- Mr. Potato Head
- Perplexus
- Puzzle
- Rubik's Cube
- Tangrams

== Science and optical ==
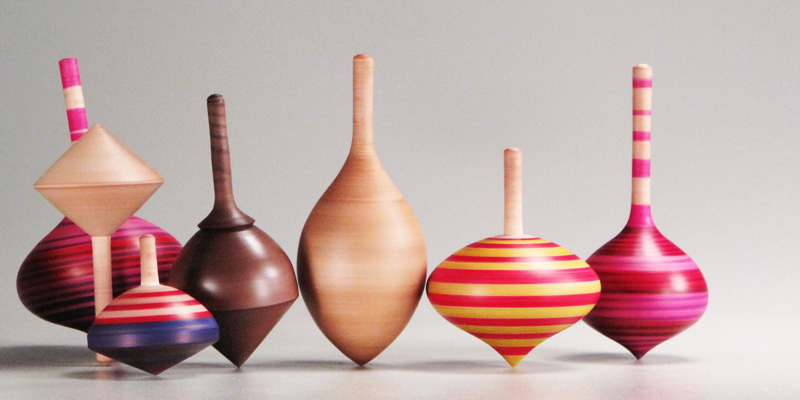
An assortment of tops

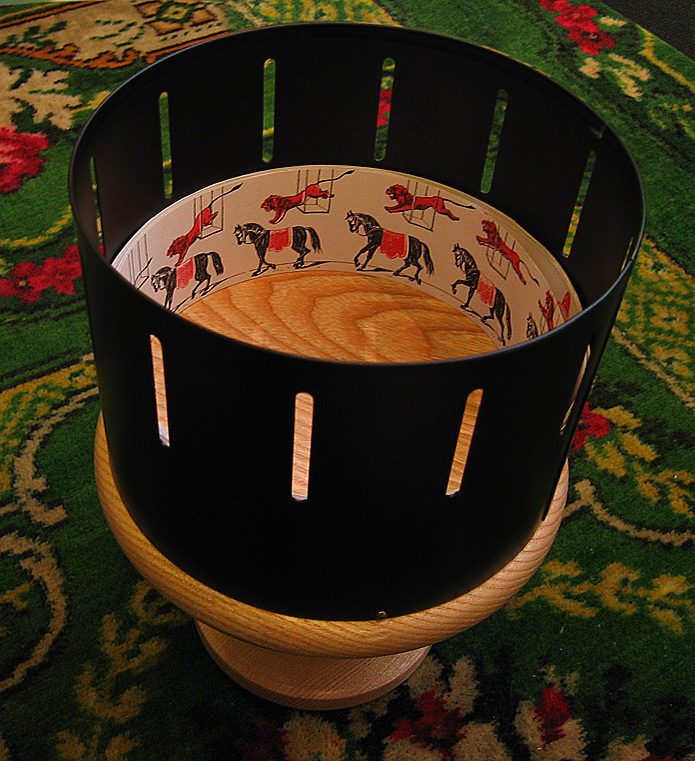
A zoetrope

- Ant Farm
- Chemistry set
- Etch A Sketch
- Jacob's ladder (toy)
- Kaleidoscope
- Magic 8 Ball
- Sea Monkeys
- Spinning top
- View-Master
- Wooly Willy
- Zoetrope

== Sound toys ==
- Jack-in-the-box
- Kazoo
- Moo box
- Groan tube
- Party horn
- Squeaky toy
- Toy piano
- Toy rattle
- Whirligig
- Whistle
- Whirly tube
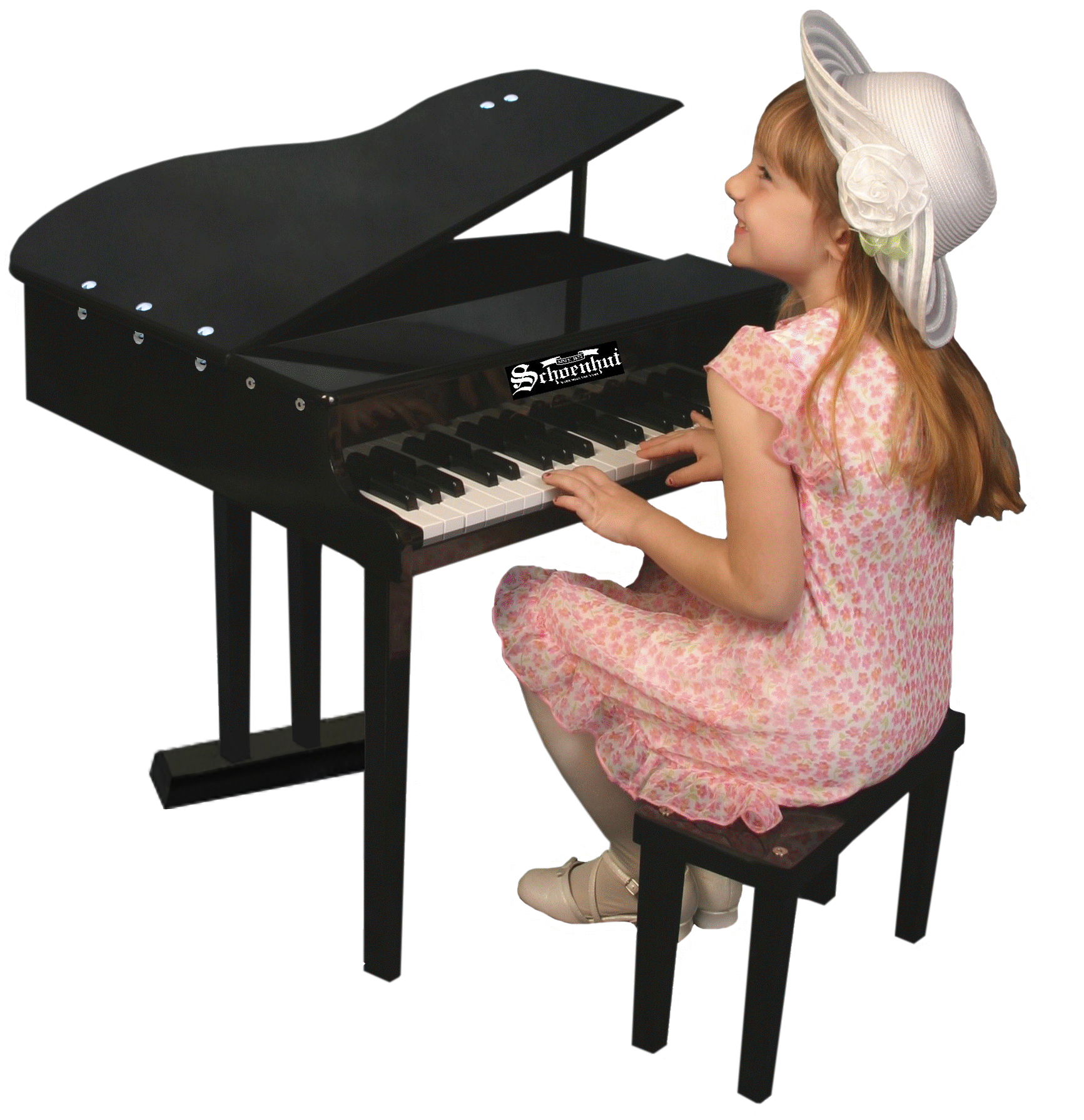
A child playing a toy piano

== Spinning toys ==
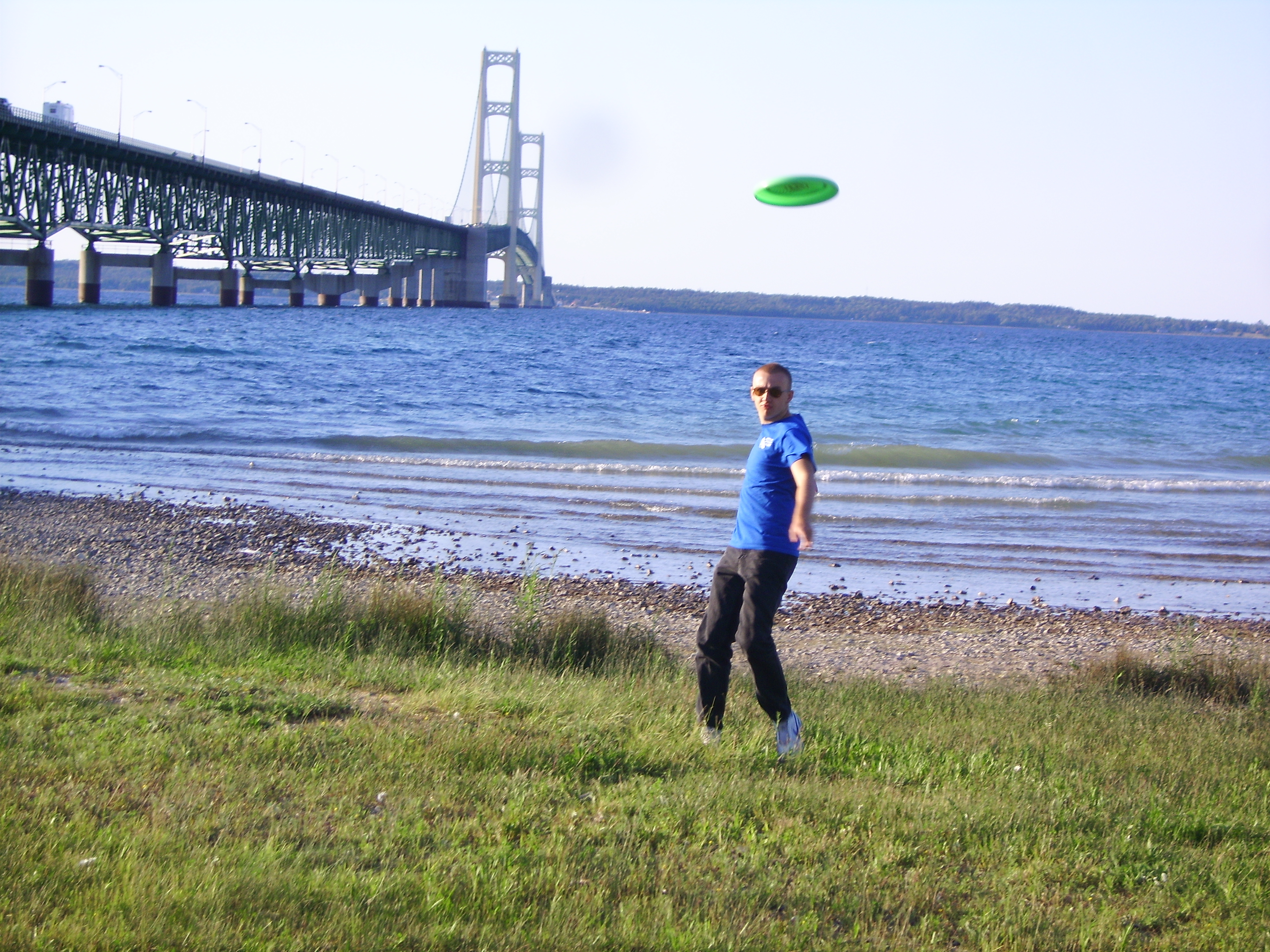
A person throwing a flying disc

- Battling Tops
- Beyblade
- Chinese yo-yo (Diabolo)
- Euler's Disk
- Fidget Spinner
- Frisbee (1950s)
- Gyroscope
- Hula hoop (1950s)
- Magnet Space Wheel (Whee-Lo)
- Pinwheel
- Top
- Yo-yo (1930s onwards)
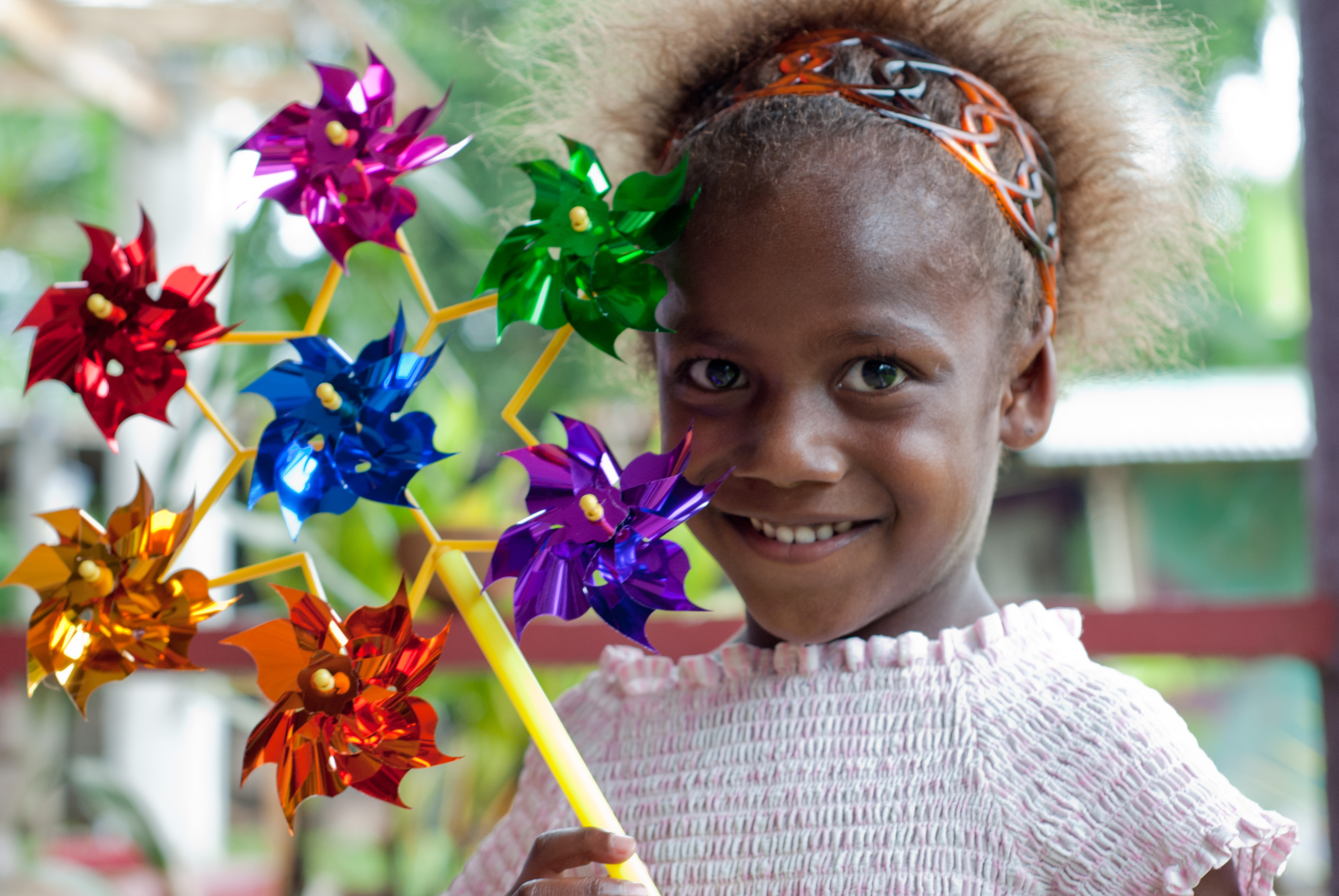
A child with pinwheels

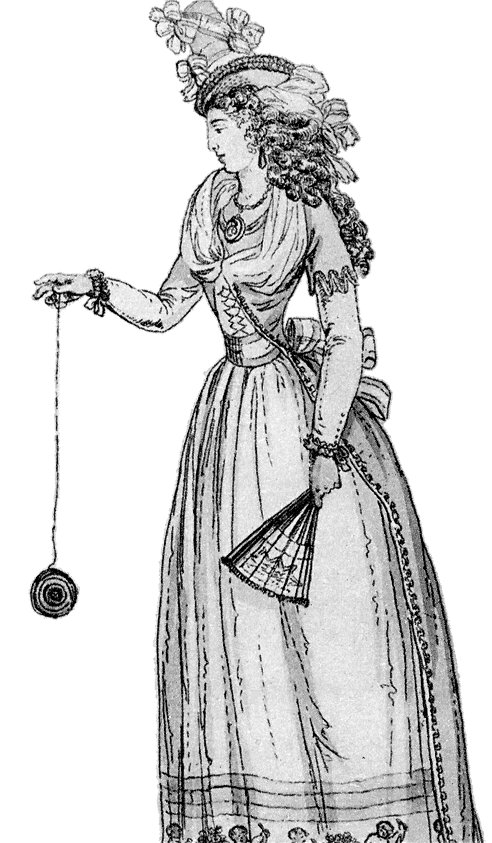
A 1791 illustration of a woman playing with an early version of the yo-yo, then known as a "bandalore"

== Wooden toys ==
- Ball-in-a-maze puzzle
- Bead maze
- Burr puzzle
- Lincoln Logs
- Matryoshka doll
- Peg wooden doll
- Roly-poly toy
- Wooden toy train

== Vehicles ==
- Boat
- Car
- Plane
- Train

== Movie and TV show toys ==
- Elmo
- Kermit the Frog

== See also ==
- Game
- Outline of games
- Category:Toys
- Category:Game manufacturers
- Category:Toy companies
- I Love Toys, a television program
