= R. A. Miller =

R. A. Miller may refer to:

- Reuben Aaron Miller (1912–2006), American folk artist
- Roy Andrew Miller (born 1924), American linguist
