= MacEdward Leach =

MacEdward Leach (1892-1967) was an American folklorist, whose work "greatly influenced the development of folklore as an academic discipline".

== Early life and education ==
Leach was born near Bridgeport, Illinois. Later in life he sometimes gave his birth date as 1896, seemingly to avoid forced retirement.

Leach graduated with a MA from Johns Hopkins University in 1917: his master's thesis was on the legend of the Holy Grail. He then researched for a doctorate at the University of Pennsylvania: studying under the Americanist, Cornelius Weygandt and anthropologist, Frank Speck.

Leach completed his doctorate, which dealt with the use of Celtic tradition in literature, in 1930.

== Personal life ==
Leach was married twice, first to Alice May (Maria) Doane, with whom he had a son, Donald. His second marriage was Nancy Rafetto, with whom he also had a son, Douglas.

Maria Leach was also a renowned folklorist: amongst her publications were The Dictionary of Folklore, Mythology, and Legend (1949–50) and The Rainbow Book of American Tales and Legends (1958).

== Career ==
After the completion of his doctorate Leach developed and taught courses on folklore within the University of Pennsylvania's Department of English. Over time, he adapted English literature courses he inherited into folklore courses: one titled "The Epic and Short Story', he gradually changed into a general folklore course, another on the literary ballad he transformed it into a folk ballad course. By 1959 Leach had developed a doctoral program in folklore and folklife - the second in the United States. A Folklore department was established at the University in 1962.

Early in his career, Leach carried out fieldwork in the Southern mountain regions of the United States, as well as in the John Crow Mountains in Jamaica. Later in life, mostly likely influenced by his Cape Breton born first wife, Leach carried out four collecting trips to Atlantic Canada. The recordings Leach made in Canada have since been made available online.

Leach was regarded as a charismatic lecturer who established the University of Pennsylvania as a well-respected site for the academic study of folklore and had an enormous impact on the folklorists he taught. One obituary credited him with being "a key man in the revolutionizing of the teaching of folklore in the United States".

MacEdward Leach spent his entire career at the university, retiring in 1966. His successor as Chair of the Folklore department was Don Yoder.

== Recognition ==
Leach served as both Secretary-Treasurer (1943–1960) and President (1961–1962) of the American Folklore Society (AFS). He has been credited with an enormous impact on the Society, having "almost single-handedly nurtured that organization from near collapse to vigor". His impact as an administrator included promoting the growth of local American folklore societies to aid the AFS and generating revenue for the AFS by creating a Bibliographical and Special Series of publications.

== Selected publications ==
Leach, MacEdward (1941). Logical Articulation. The English Journal, 30(9), 754–764. https://doi.org/10.2307/805900

Leach, MacEdward; Beck, Horace P. (1950). "Songs from Rappahannock County, Virginia". The Journal of American Folklore. 63 (249): 257. doi:10.2307/536528

Leach, MacEdward. 1958. 'Folklore in American Colleges and Universities'. Journal of American Folklore Supplement, pp10–11.

Leach, MacEdward. (1955). The Ballad Book. New York: Harper.

Leach, MacEdward. (1957). Folksong and Ballad. A New Emphasis. The Journal of American Folklore, 70(277), 205–207. https://doi.org/10.2307/538317

Leach, MacEdward. (1957). 'Celtic Tales from Cape Breton' in W.E. Richmond, ed. Studies in Folklore. Bloomington: Indiana University University Press. 1957.

Leach, MacEdward (1960). "Reply to Maud Karpeles". The Journal of American Folklore. 73 (289): 275. doi:10.2307/538005

Leach, MacEdward, and Coffin, Tristram P. (1961). The Critics and the Ballad. Carbondale: Southern Illinois University Press.

Leach, MacEdward (1961). Studies in medieval literature. In honor of Professor Albert Croll Baugh. Philadelphia: University of Pennsylvania Press.

Leach, MacEdward (1961). "Jamaican Duppy Lore". The Journal of American Folklore. 74 (293): 207. doi:10.2307/537633

Leach, MacEdward (1962-06). "Problems of Collecting Oral Literature". Publications of the Modern Language Association of America. 77 (3): 335–340. doi:10.2307/460494 ISSN 0030-8129.

Leach, MacEdward (1963). "Folklore of Jamaica: A Survey." Schweizerisches Archiv für Volkskunde 59: 60–81.

Leach, MacEdward (1963). "What Shall We Do with "Little Matty Groves"?". The Journal of American Folklore. 76 (301): 189. doi:10.2307/538519

Leach, MacEdward (1964). "Matthew Arnold and 'Celtic Magic'." In Ray B. Browne et al., eds. The Celtic Cross. Studies in Irish Culture and Literature." Lafayette: Purdue University Studies.

Leach, MacEdward. (1965). Folk Ballads and Songs of the lower Labrador Coast. Ottawa: National Museum.

Leach, MacEdward (1966). "Folklore in American Regional Literature". Journal of the Folklore Institute. 3 (3): 376. doi:10.2307/3813808

Leach, MacEdward (1966). "John Henry." In Folklore and Society: Essays in Honor of Benjamin A. Botkin. Hatboro, PA: Folklore Associates.

Leach, MacEdward (1966). Songs from the Outports of Newfoundland (sound recording). Washington: Smithsonian Folkways. FE 4075. 1966.

Leach, MacEdward (1967). "Superstitions of South Scotland from a Manuscript of Thomas Wilkie." In D.K. Wilgus & Carol Sommer, ed. Folklore International. Hatboro: Folklore Associates.

Leach, MacEdward and Glassie, Henry (1968) A guide for collectors of oral traditions and folk cultural material in Pennsylvania. With Henry Glassie. Harrisburg: Pennsylvania Historical and Museum Commission.

Leach, MacEdward (1967). "The Men Who Made Folklore a Scholarly Discipline." In Tristram Coffin, ed. Our Living Tradition: An Introduction to American Folklore. New York: Basic Books, 1968.

Leach, MacEdward (1973). The Terror of Quidi Vidi Lake: and other Newfoundland ghost poems. Agincourt: Book Society of Canada. 1973.
