= Little Tikes =

American children's toys manufacturer

- Type: Subsidiary
- Industry: Entertainment
- Founded: 1967; 59 years ago
- Founder: Tom G. Murdough Jr.
- Headquarters: Hudson, Ohio, United States
- Area served: Worldwide
- Products: Toys, juvenile furnishings, action figures
- Number of employees: 500
- Parent: MGA Entertainment (2006–present)
- Website: littletikes.com

Little Tikes is an American manufacturer of children's toys, with headquarters and manufacturing located in Hudson, Ohio. The company also has other manufacturing and distribution facilities in Asia and Europe. Little Tikes' products are mostly low-tech molded plastic toys aimed primarily at infants, toddlers and young children, for indoor and outdoor use, including its party kitchen and turtle sandbox.

== History ==
The company was established by Tom G. Murdough Jr. and Jack E. Hill in Aurora, Ohio, in 1967; Murdough purchased Hill's share of the company in 1969. The company was acquired by Rubbermaid in 1984. Murdough signed an employment agreement with Rubbermaid under which he would stay with the new parent company for a five-year period as president and general manager through 1989.

In May 1989, Murdough announced that he would be leaving Little Tikes at the end of that year to pursue other interests. In 1991, Murdough established a new toy business called Step 2, now based in Streetsboro, Ohio, aimed at competing with and outselling Little Tikes. In 1999, Rubbermaid merged with Newell to form Newell Rubbermaid.

The company was acquired by MGA Entertainment in September 2006 from Newell Rubbermaid for an undisclosed sum. As of 2006, the 500 employees at Little Tikes were generating approximately $250 million in revenue of Rubbermaid's $6.3 billion in annual sales, and the acquisition was projected to add $15 to $25 million to MGA Entertainment's bottom line. The purchase was said to allow a better fit with MGA Entertainment, a manufacturer of children's toys and entertainment products founded in 1979 whose products included the Bratz line of fashion dolls.

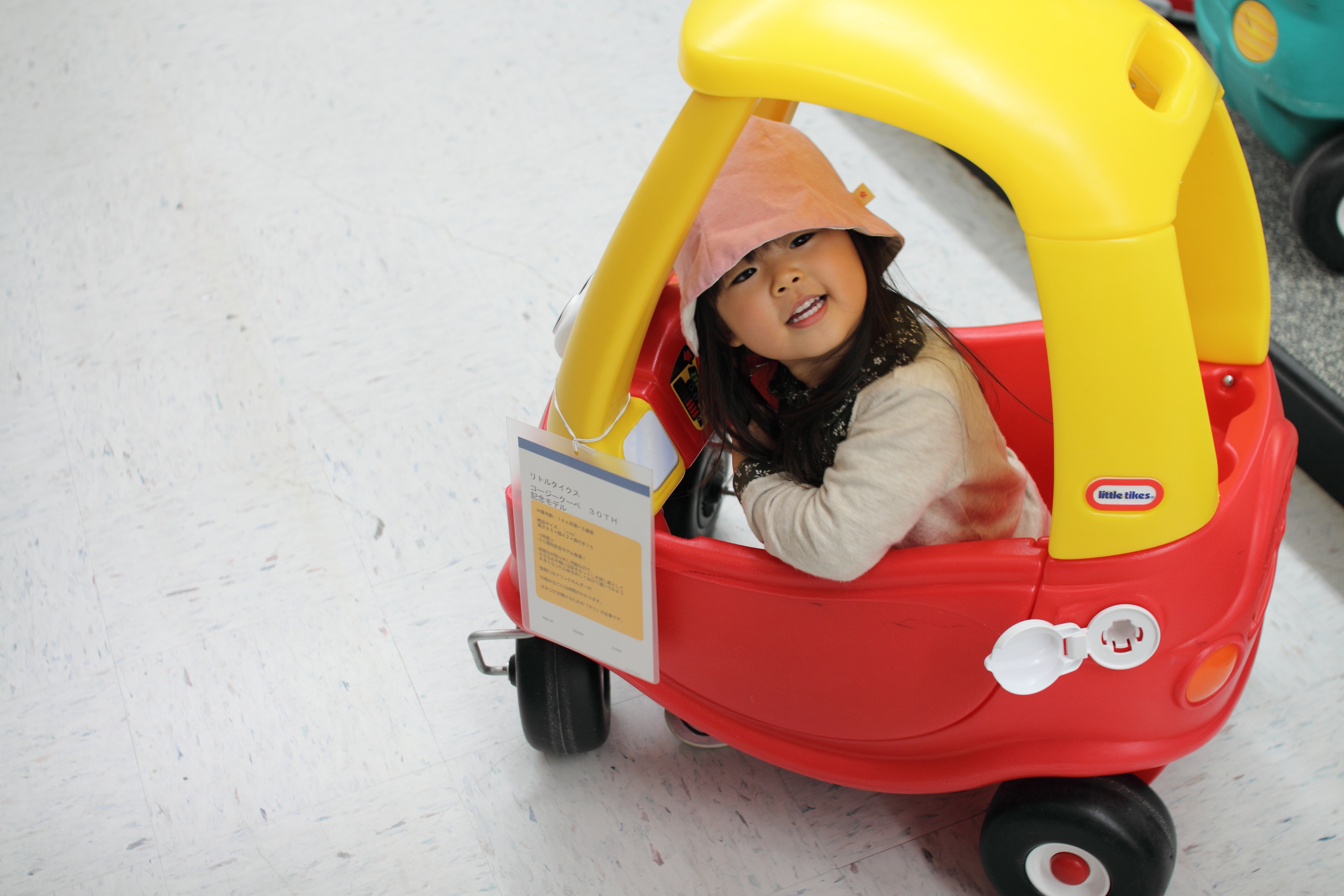
A Little Tikes Cozy Coupe with a child occupant

The firm's red and yellow Cozy Coupe toy car, released in 1979, reached 6 million units in sales by its 25th anniversary in 2004, and was called the "world's best-selling car for much of this decade" by The New York Times in 1998, outselling the Honda Accord and Ford Taurus. In 2009, cartoon eyes and a smile were added to the car. In 2022, the Cozy Coupe was transformed into a one-off electric car with the gas cap replaced by an electric socket and charger. Today, they still sell both the charger and gas pump.

While the company had traditionally focused on durable plastic toys that allow children to use their imagination while at play, by 2004 it had introduced its Magicook Kitchen, which uses radio frequency devices to allow components to communicate with each other, such as having the stove respond when it recognizes that a piece of food is placed on it.

Murdough was nominated for the Toy Industry Hall of Fame in 2019 and inducted in 2020.

== See also ==
- Playskool
- LEGO Duplo
- Fisher-Price
