= Amish doll =

Rag doll

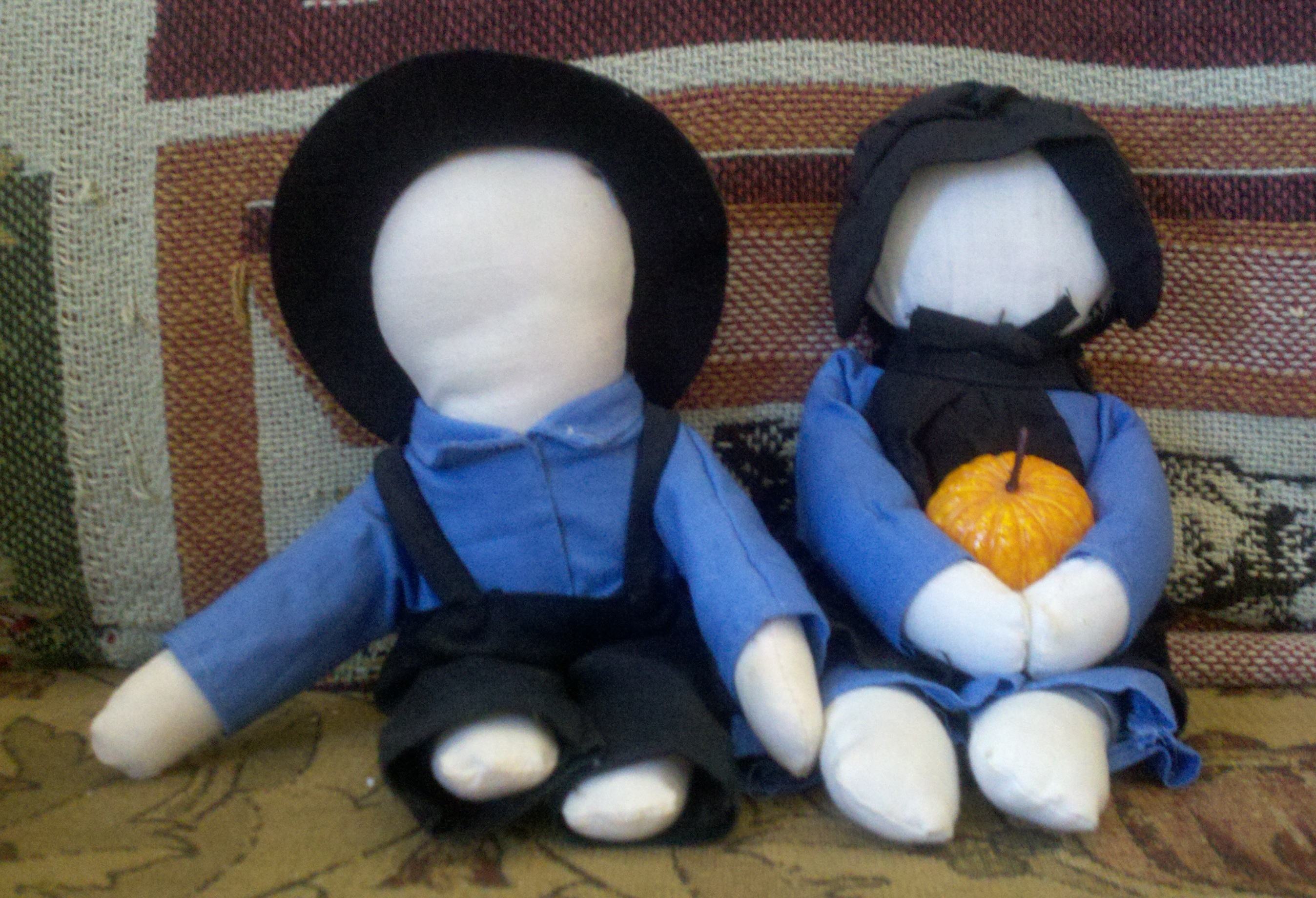
Faceless Amish dolls

Amish dolls are a type of rag doll and a popular form of American folk art, which originated as children's toys among the Old Order Amish people. While some Amish dolls have faces, the majority of them do not, to emphasize the fact that all are alike in the eyes of God.

== History ==
There are several accounts of the origins of faceless dolls used by Amish children. One account says that a young Amish girl was given a rag doll with a face for Christmas. Her father became upset and cut the head off the doll. He reportedly said "Only God can make people." He then replaced the head with a stuffed stocking that did not have a face. The little girl played happily with the doll for many years. Some Amish children have wrapped blankets around small logs and pretended they were dolls. A sociological study from 2007 says that the dolls are left faceless because "all are alike in the eyes of God", and that the lack of facial features agrees with the Bible's commandment against graven images.

Most Amish doll makers were anonymous. An exception was Lizzie Lapp (1860–1932) of Lancaster County, Pennsylvania, who sold her dolls under her own name. Similar dolls were made by members of Mennonite churches, a related religious group.

== Characteristics ==
An Amish doll is best described as a plain rag doll usually lacking physical features of a face and hair. It is also thought that a face on a doll makes it appear more worldly, which is not considered acceptable among the Amish. Not all Amish dolls, however, are faceless. Clothing on Amish dolls is similar to that worn by Amish children. Both girl and boy dolls are common; Amish children do not have a lot of toys, so both boys and girls play with the dolls. Fabrics are all solid colored. The doll body is commonly made from white or cream fabric, such as unbleached muslin, since the materials traditionally used to make the dolls are remnants from clothing made for family members. Faces were often made of oilcloth. The stuffing was traditionally rags, but usage of cotton, or in modern days polyester batting, is also common.

The dolls themselves may be sewn by hand or machine. Machine sewing in the Amish community is generally done by using a foot-operated treadle sewing machine. On older Amish dolls, it is not uncommon to see several layers of cloth on the head or body of one doll. When a doll became too dirty or badly worn, the head as well as its arms and legs would be completely covered with fresh cloth.

Antique Amish dolls made for and used by Amish children are highly collectible and can sell for upwards of US $1,000. However, reproductions made to deceive have proliferated, depressing the market.

== Tourist market ==
Wide interest in collecting Amish crafts began in the 1930s, and in 1939, Cornelius Weygandt, a professor at the University of Pennsylvania, described his collection of Amish and Mennonite dolls, praising the "painstaking fidelity" of their costumes. National advertisements for Amish dolls appeared in House & Garden magazine in 1941. These dolls, however, had faces. As tourism increased over the decades, faceless dolls have frequently appeared in souvenir shops near Amish communities. In 1955, John A. Hostetler, an expert on Amish society, described the marketing of dolls to tourists as an aspect of the commercialization of Amish culture.
