= Pinwheel (toy) =

Toy with a stick and a wheel

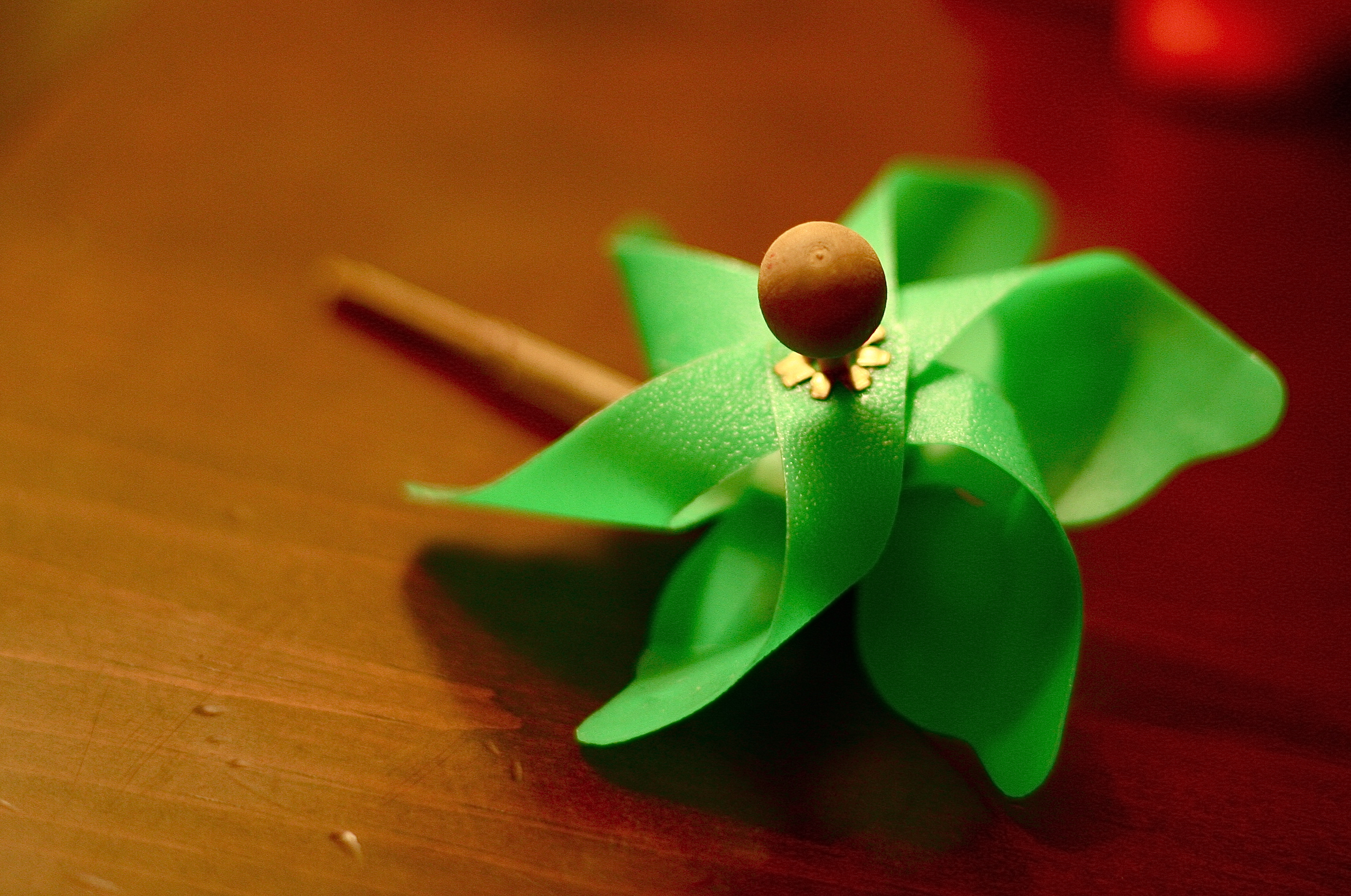
A pinwheel

Traditional Bangladeshi pinwheel, made with paper and plastic

A pinwheel (or windmill outside North America) is a simple child's toy made of a wheel of paper or plastic curls attached at its axle to a stick by a pin. It is designed to spin when blown upon by a person or by the wind.

== History ==
A similar toy had developed independently in Polynesia (known as pekapeka or peʻapeʻa) using either coconut palm leaflets or strips of pandanus leaves; in colder climates like that of New Zealand (the toy also called pepepe in Māori), phormium leaves are used.

Today's most popular style of pinwheels is rooted in East Asia. The design for example is typical of a Japanese origami folding technique for a pinwheel.

During the nineteenth century in the United States, any wind-driven toy held aloft by a running child was characterized as a whirligig, including pinwheels. Pinwheels provided many children with numerous minutes of enjoyment and amusement.

== See also ==
- List of toys
