= Gee-haw whammy diddle =

Two stick mechanical toy

Spinning gee-haw whammy diddle

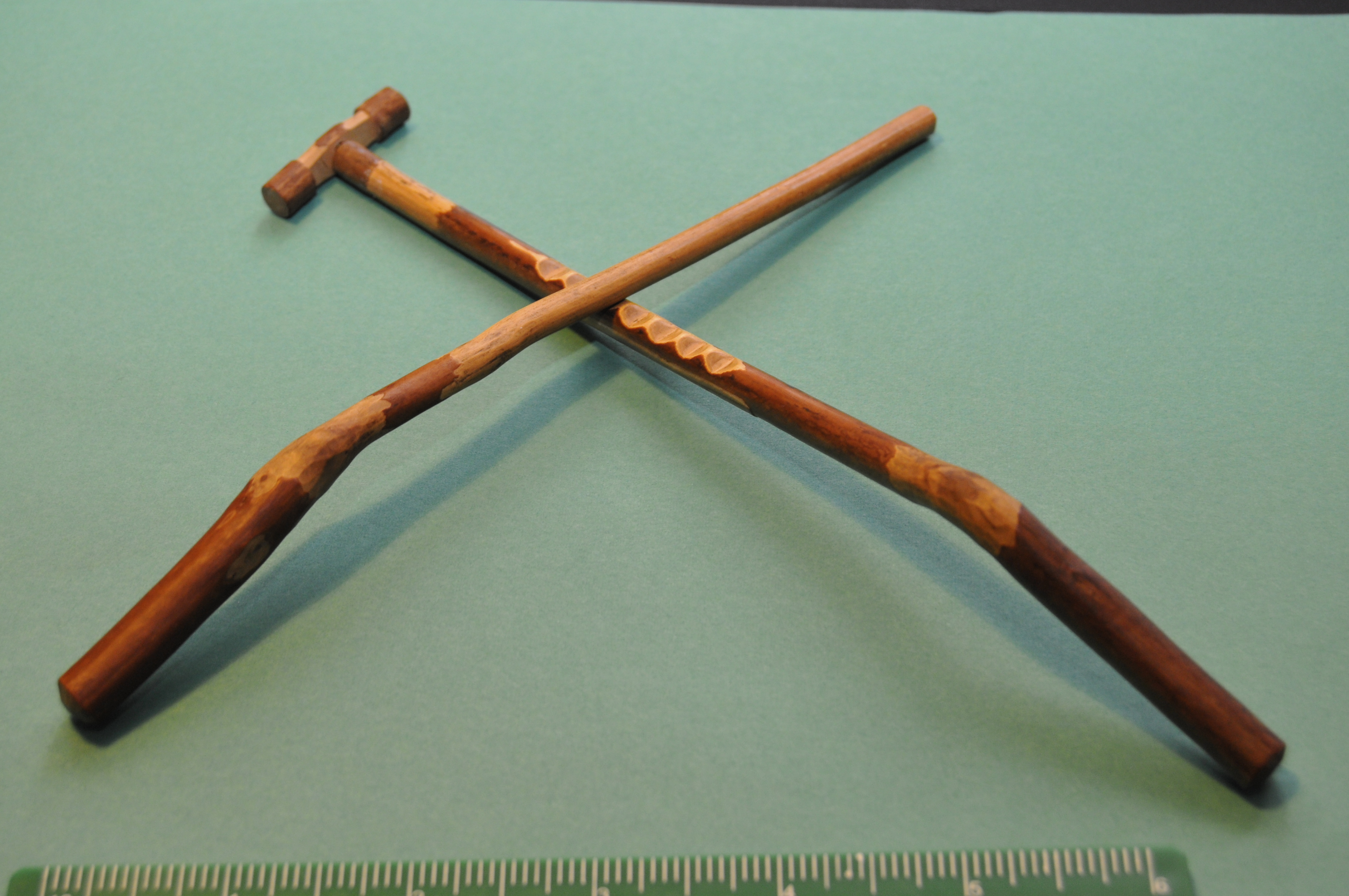
The gee-haw whammy diddle

A gee-haw whammy diddle is a mechanical toy consisting of two wooden sticks. One has a series of notches cut transversely along its side and a smaller wooden stick or a propeller attached to the end with a nail or pin. This stick is held stationary in one hand with the notches up, and the other stick is rubbed rapidly back and forth across the notches. This causes the propeller to rotate. Sometimes also known as a ouija windmill, a hoodoo stick or a VooDoo stick. The word whammy is sometimes whimmy, and the word diddle sometimes doodle, giving it three possible other names, and the gee-haw may also be dropped.

Gee-haw refers to the fact that, by rubbing a finger against the notched stick while rubbing, the direction of the spinning propeller may be reversed. The operator may do this surreptitiously and yell "gee" or "haw" to make it appear that the propeller is reacting to the commands. When called a hooey stick, the word "hooey" is used to signify the change of direction.

== Physical explanation ==
The nail holding the propeller must pass through a hole of approximately twice its diameter, essentially a twirling hoop on a stick. The side force of the finger or thumb on the notched stick forces it to the side as each notch is hit, thus giving it a repeating side jump to pivot the propeller in one direction or the other. A nicely balanced propeller will spin just fine, and it actually is not critical to have it heavy to one side, because the hole diameter always allows one side (slightly longer) to drop during the jerking motion which occurs. To observe the effect, the propeller attached to the end of the ribbed stick must not be pinned at its exact centre of mass, i.e. off-center or loose. For a functioning whammy diddle, there should be a "preferred" angle (i.e. when stationary, if the propeller is rotated around its axis and then released, it should return to its lowest-energy rest angle relative to the ribbed stick.) Rubbing the ribbed stick with another stick along the grooves creates a vertical alternating driving force $F_y$ acting on the centre of mass of the propeller:

$$F_y(t) = Y \cos(\omega t)$$

where $\omega = 2\pi/T$ and T is the time taken for the stick to move from one groove to the next; $Y$ is some unknown scaling factor that characterizes the force with which the two sticks are pressed against one another. By rubbing a finger against these grooves on the side, one can also introduce a horizontal alternating driving force $F_x$

$$F_x(t) = X \cos(\omega t + \phi)$$

where $\phi$ is a phase shift (describing the lag time between when the grooves contacts the moving rod, and finger respectively) and, again, X is some unknown scaling factor. Importantly, $\omega$ is the same frequency, and the two driving forces are said to be phase locked. The confluence of two phase matched driving forces in orthogonal directions gives rise to a rotational force on the centre of mass at the propeller end, and thus, rotation.

When the operator of the whammy-diddle surreptitiously changes the side at which their finger contacts the stick (e.g. by contacting with the thumb instead of the fore-finger, or by changing the side at which a finger contacts the grooves of the base) they change the sign of the phase $\phi$, and thus reverses the rotation.

== See also ==
- Whirligig
