= Whirligig =

Object that spins or whirls

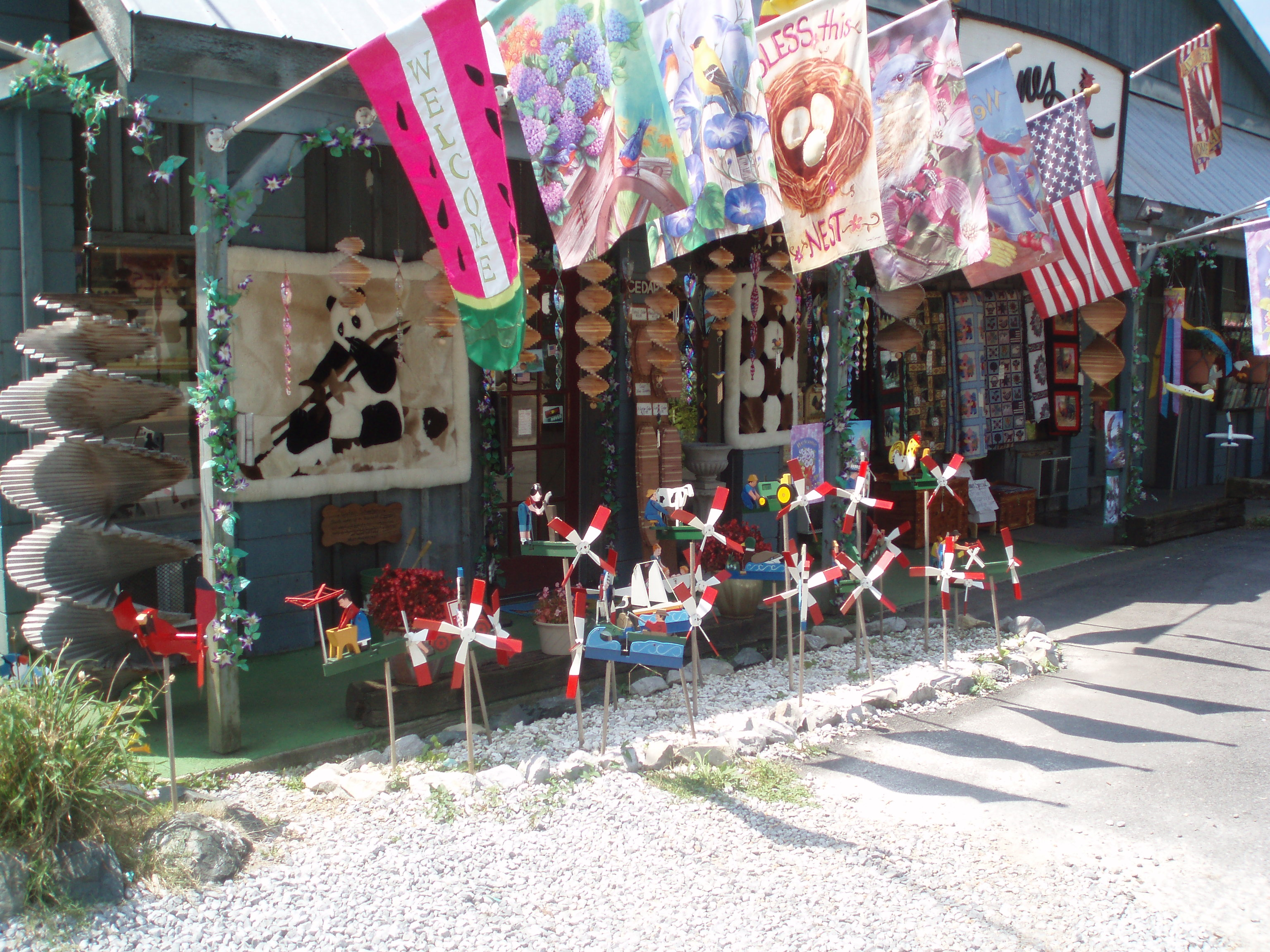
Whirligig store

A whirligig is an object that spins or whirls, or has at least one part that spins or whirls. They are most commonly powered by the wind but can be hand-, friction- or motor-powered. They can be used as kinetic garden ornaments, and can be designed to transmit sound and vibration into the ground to repel burrowing rodents.

== Types ==
Whirligigs can be divided into four categories: button, friction, string, and wind-driven.

=== Button whirligigs ===
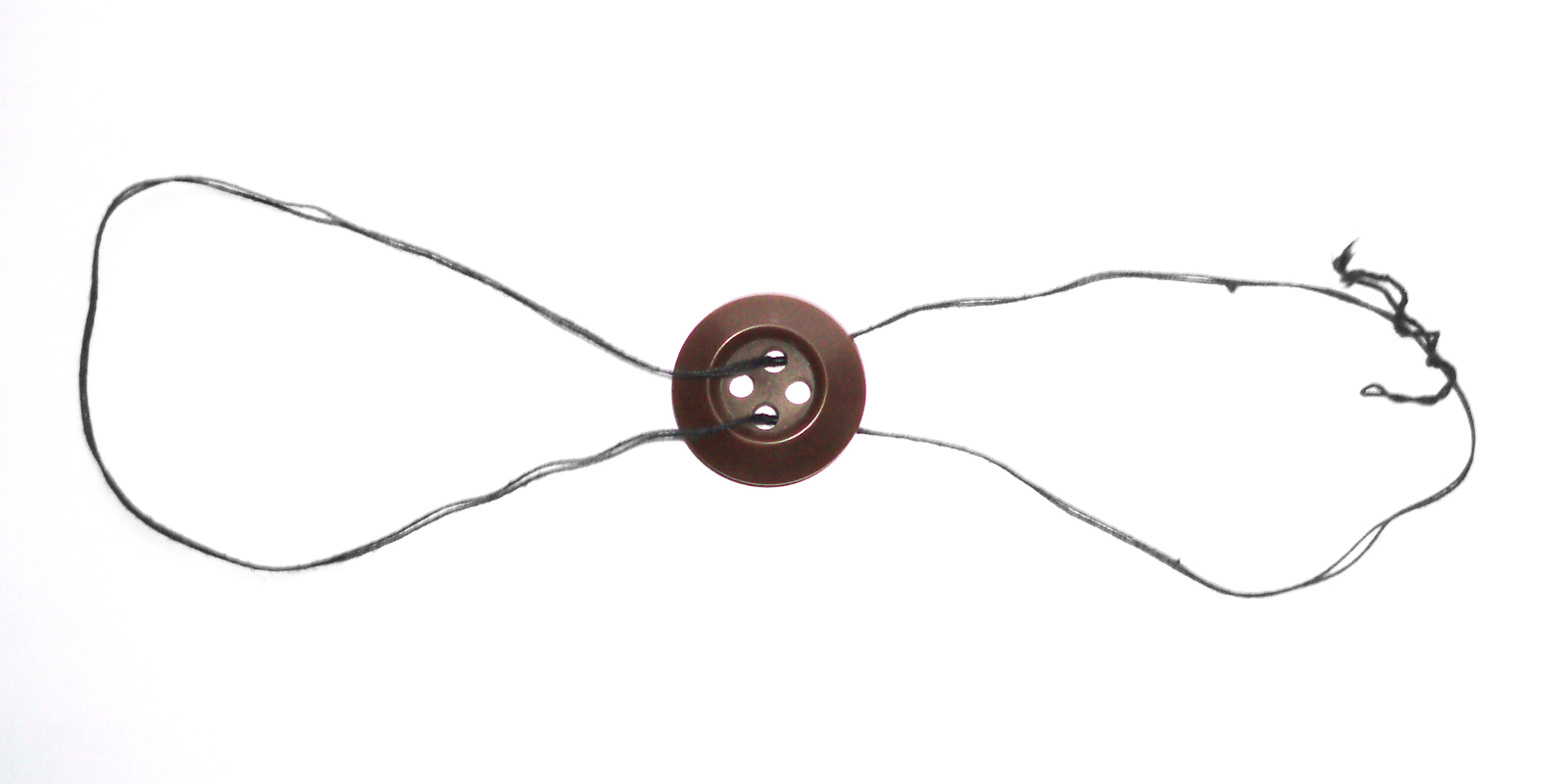
A traditional button whirligig from Ukraine—called a furkalka (фуркалка) due to the sound made while spinning

Button whirligigs, also known as button spinners and buzzers, are the oldest known whirligigs. They require only a piece of clay or bone and a strip of hide. The ancient Greeks had their own version of this toy, called an iynx, and Native American cultures had another in 500 BC. They were a popular children's toy during the Great Depression.

Button whirligigs are simple spinning toys whereby two looped ends of twisting thread are pulled with both arms, causing the button to spin. Button whirligigs are often seen today in craft shops and souvenir stores in the southern Appalachian Mountains.

A toy with a similar principle can be found in rural Malaysia especially near rubber plantations making use of rubber tree seeds.

==== Buzzers ====
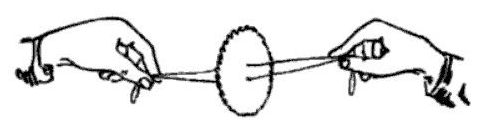
The Saw-Mill, an American home-built buzz toy.

A buzzer (also known as a buzz, bullroarer or button-on-a-string) is an ancient mechanical device used for ceremonial purposes and as a toy. It is constructed by centering an object at the midpoint of a cord or thong and winding the cord while holding the ends stationary. The object is whirled by alternately pulling and releasing the tension on the cord. The whirling object makes a buzzing or humming sound, giving the device its common name.

The sound can be modulated by how quickly the button is spinning and by the tightness of the string. A buzzer is often constructed by running string through two of the holes on a large button and is a common and easily made toy.

American Natives used the buzzer as a toy and, also ceremonially, as to call up the wind. Early American buzzers were constructed of wood, bone, or stone, and date from at least the Fourche Maline Culture, c. 500 B.C.

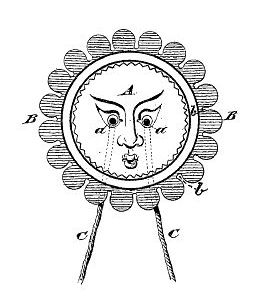
Drawing, "Toy Buzz", US Patent 193201, 1877

North American buzzers, buzzes, etc.
Eastern Cree; 1912 "A Buzzer of Bone"	Inuit; 1892 "Buzz Toy"	American Girl; 1916 "Whirligig Made from a Large Button"

=== Friction and string whirligigs ===
String-powered whirligigs require the operator to wrap the string around a shaft and then pull the string to cause the whirligig's motion. String whirligigs have ancient origins. The bamboo-copter or bamboo butterfly was invented in China in 400 BC. While the initial invention did not use string to launch a propeller, later Chinese versions did. The first known depictions of whirligigs are string-powered versions in tapestries from medieval times.

Friction whirligigs, also called gee-haws, depend on the holder rubbing a stick against a notched shaft resulting in a propeller at the end of the shaft turning, largely as the result of the vibration carried along the shaft. The motion needed to power a friction whirligig is very similar to rubbing sticks together to create fire. Friction whirligigs are another staple of craft shops and souvenir stores in the Appalachian Mountains.

=== Wind-driven ===
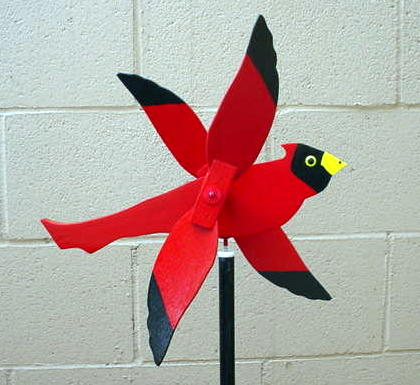
Wooden cardinal whirligig

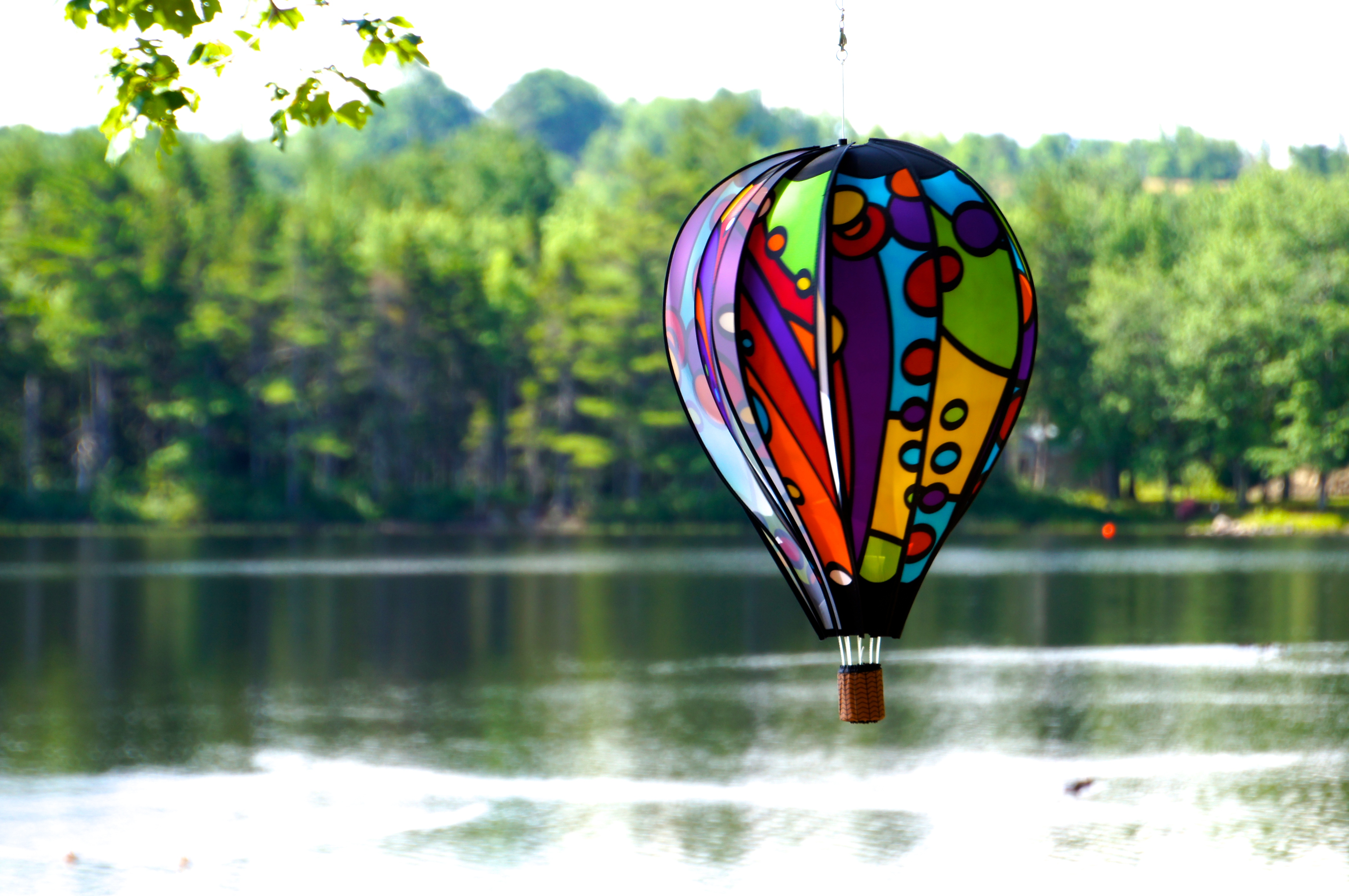
Wind-driven whirligig at a lake in Nova Scotia, Canada, designed to look like a hot air balloon.

A wind-driven whirligig transfers the energy of the wind into either a simple release of kinetic energy through rotation or a more complicated transfer of rotational energy to power a simple or complicated mechanism that produces repetitive motions or creates sounds. The wind simply pushes on the whirligig turning one part of it and it then uses inertia.

The simplest and most common example of a wind-driven whirligig is the pinwheel. The pinwheel demonstrates the most important aspect of a whirligig — blade surface. Pinwheels have a large cupped surface area which allows the pinwheel to reach its terminal speed fairly quickly at low wind speed.

Increasing the blade area of the whirligig increases the surface area so more air particles collide with the whirligig. This causes the drag force to reach its maximum value and the whirligig to reach its terminal speed in less time. Conversely the terminal speed is smaller when thin or short blades with a smaller surface area are utilized, resulting in the need for a higher wind speed to start and operate the whirligig.

Whirligigs come in a range of sizes and configurations, bounded only by human ingenuity. The two blade non-mechanical model is the most prevalent, exemplified by the classic Cardinal with Wings illustrated at right.

== History ==
=== Etymology of the word ===
The word whirligig derives from two Middle English words: whirlen (to whirl) and gigg (top), or literally "to whirl a top". The Oxford English Dictionary cites the Promptorium parvulorum (c. 1440), the first English-Latin dictionary, which contains the definition "Whyrlegyge, chyldys game, Latin: giracu-lum". It is therefore likely the 1440 version of whirligig referred to a spinning toy or toys.

=== Origins and evolution ===
Wooden rooster whirligig

The origin of whirligigs is unknown. Both farmers and sailors use weather vanes, and the assumption is one or both groups are probably the originators. By 400 BC the bamboo-copter or dragon butterfly, a helicopter-like rotor launched by rolling a stick, had been invented in China. Wind-driven whirligigs were technically possible by 700 AD when the Sasanian Empire began using windmills to lift water for irrigation. The weather vane, which dates to the Sumerians in 1600–1800 BC, is the second component of wind-driven whirligigs.

In early Chinese, Egyptian, Persian, Greek, and Roman civilizations there are ample examples of weathervanes but as yet, no examples of a propeller-driven whirligig have been found. A grinding corn doll of ancient Egyptian origin demonstrates that string-operated whirligigs were already in use by 100 BC.

The first known visual representation of a European whirligig is contained in a medieval tapestry that depicts children playing with a whirligig, consisting of a hobby horse on one end of a stick and a four-blade propeller at the other end.

For reasons that are unclear, whirligigs in the shape of the cross became a fashionable allegory in paintings of the fifteenth and sixteenth century. An oil by Hieronymus Bosch, probably completed between 1480 and 1500 and known as the Christ Child with a Walking Frame, contains a clear illustration of a string-powered whirligig.

A book published in Stuttgart in 1500 shows the Christ child in the margin with a string-powered whirligig.

The Jan Provoost attributed late sixteenth-century painting Virgin and Child in a Landscape clearly shows the Christ child holding a whirligig as well.

The American version of the wind-driven whirligig probably did not originate with the immigrant population of the United Kingdom, as whirligigs are mentioned in early American colonial times. How the wind-driven whirligig evolved in America is not fully known, though there are some markers. George Washington brought whilagigs of an unknown design, while returning from the Revolutionary War.

By the mid-18th century weathervanes had evolved to include free moving "wings". These "wings" could be human arms; pitchforks; spoons, or virtually any type of implement. The 1819 publication by Washington Irving of The Legend of Sleepy Hollow contains the following description: "a little wooden warrior who, armed with a sword in each hand, was most valiantly fighting the wind on the pinnacle of the barn".

By the latter half of the 19th century, constructing wind-driven whirligigs had become a pastime and art form. What began as a simple turning of artificial feathers in the wind advanced into full-blown mechanisms producing both motion and sound. Unfortunately, both the exposure to the weather and the fragile nature of whirligigs means very few wind-driven whirligigs from this era survive. The period between 1880 and 1900 brought rapid geographic expansion of whirligigs across the US. After 1900, production seemed for the most part to center on the southern Appalachians. Craftsman there continued to produce whirligigs into the 20th century. During the Great Depression a resurgence in production by craftsman and amateurs was attributed to the need for ready cash.

Today whirligigs are used as toys for children, as garden structures designed to keep birds or other garden pests away, as decorative yard art, and as art for indoors display.

== As folk art ==
Folk art whirligig

Detail of farmer pulling bull

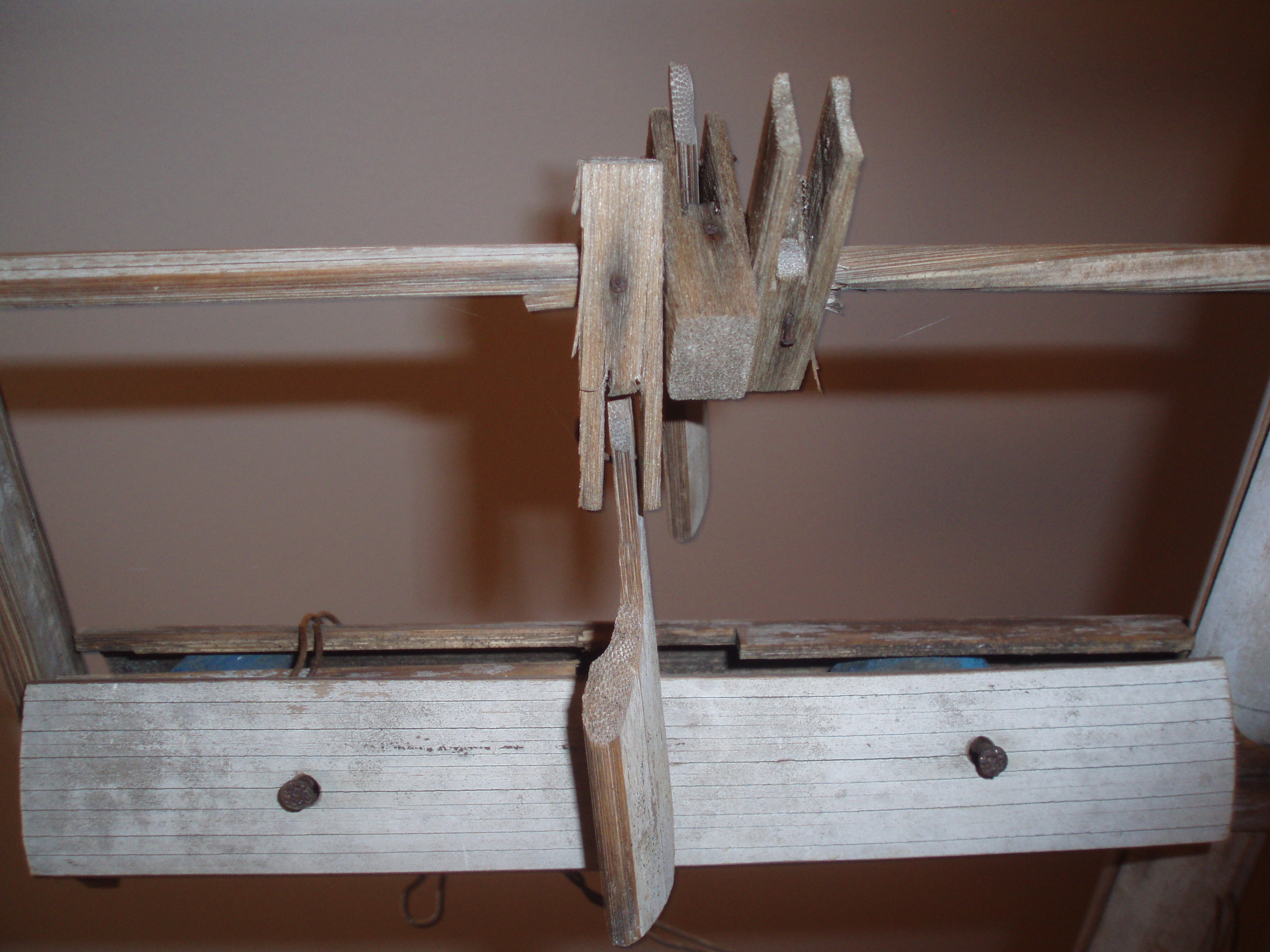
Detail of music mechanism – farmer pulling bull

A number of encyclopedic museums and more-specialized folk art museums now have collections or examples of whirligigs in their collections.

When whirligigs became recognized as American folk art is unclear, but today they are a well established sub-category. With recognition, folk art whirligigs have increased in value.

The photo on the right is of a traditional whirligig commonly found in Bali, Indonesia. They are still available, and are often used in the rice paddies as the sound they make when the wind blows scares birds away. This example was found near Clarkrange, Tennessee, on the Highway 127 Corridor Sale. It represents an interesting example of a combination mechanical and sound producing whirligig.

The propeller, the Balinese farmer and the bull are of tin. The farmer and bull are painted but the propeller blades are not. The body is of hand whittled bamboo, fastened with rusty nails and wire and a single piece of string. There are still pencil marks where various pieces were centered and/or aligned.

The farmer is connected to the shaft of the whirligig by a bamboo stick with an offset where the stick connects to the shaft. The result is: as the shaft turns the farmer's arm lifts from the offset shaft which makes the farmer pull the string which lifts the bull's head.

The shaft contains a second feature, a set of knockers that create a bit of music on raised pieces of bamboo. There are a total of six knockers which strike six bamboo plates. The bamboo plates are raised by placing a circular piece of bamboo or something similar between the knockers and the bamboo base. Each rotation causes three knockers to hit plates so the sound is actually different at each rotation. The knockers are nailed in pattern to the shaft.

Whirligigs from folk artist Reuben Aaron Miller and others are considered highly collectable. However, whirligigs' monetary value as folk art has been uneven. At a 1998 auction at Skinner Galleries, a 19th-century Uncle Sam with saw and flag in excellent condition sold for $12,650. At a 2000 auction at Skinner Galleries a 19th-century polychrome carved pine and copper band figure whirligig in excellent condition sold for $10,925 and an early 20th-century bike rider of painted wood and sheet metal sold for $3,450. In 2005, a 20th-century folk art whirligig in good condition brought $2,900 at an auction at Horst Auction Center in Lancaster, Pennsylvania.

== In literature ==
William Shakespeare, in Twelfth Night, uses the whirligig as a metaphor for "what goes around, comes around".

In his play Cupid's Whirligig, Edward Sharpham has the deity of love cast a spell over a group of Londoners so that one falls for another, who falls for another, and so on until the final person falls for the first: a cupid's whirligig.

O. Henry wrote a short story called "The Whirligig of Life", about a mountain couple who decide to divorce and the events that lead to their remarriage told from the perspective of the judge. The collection of O.Henry's short stories in which "The Whirligig of Life" appeared in 1910 was titled "Whirligigs".

Lloyd Biggle, Jr. wrote a novel titled The Whirligig of Time as part of his science fiction series featuring Jan Darzek, a former private detective.

In Whirligig, a novel by Paul Fleischman, a boy makes a mistake that takes the life of a young girl and is sent on a cross-country journey building whirligigs.

In the Newbery Award-Winning young adult novel Missing May by Cynthia Rylant, Ob, the main character's uncle, makes whirligigs as a hobby. After his wife who loved the whirligigs dies, the whirligigs continue to move and symbolize the fact that life must go on for Ob.

== In films ==
In the movie Twister, Helen Hunt's aunt Meg (played by Lois Smith) has a large collection of metal kinetic art whirligigs in her front yard to warn her of approaching tornadoes.

== In science ==
Manu Prakash, an assistant professor of bioengineering, and Saad Bhamla, a postdoctoral student at Stanford University built in 2016 an inexpensive, hand-powered centrifuge based on this ancient toy, that could help doctors working in developing countries. The 2 g (0.071 oz) Paperfuge with a material cost of 20 cents achieved 30,000 g at 125,000 rpm, separating pure blood plasma in less than 1.5 minutes and isolating malaria parasites in 15 minutes.

== See also ==
- Bullroarer
- Christmas pyramid (similar to a wind-driven whirligig, but using hot air rising from candles)
- Gee-haw whammy diddle
- Whirly tube
- Whirligig beetle

== General bibliography ==
- Beard, D.C. (1983). The American boy's handy book: what to do and how to do it. Boston: David R. Godine. ISBN 9780879234492. LCCN 82003155.
- Bishop, Robert and Coblentz, Patricia; A Gallery of American Weathervanes and Whirligigs (ISBN 0525476520 / 0-525-47652-0); E.P. Dutton, NY, 1981.
- Bridgewater, Alan; and Bridgewater, Gill; The Wonderful World of Whirligigs and Wind Machines (ISBN 0830683496 / 0-8306-8349-6); Tab Books, 1990
- Burda, Cindy; Wind Toys That Spin, Sing, Twirl & Whirl; (ISBN 0806939346 / 0-8069-3934-6); Sterling, New York, 1999
- Fitzgerald, Ken; Weathervanes and Whirligigs; Bramhall House, 1967
- Hall, A. Neely; Perkins, Dorothy. Handicraft for Handy Girls: Practical Plans for Work and Play. Boston: Lothrop, Lee & Shepard Co. (1916).
- Kroeber, Alfred L. "The Arapaho," Part IV "Religion", Bulletin American Museum of Natural History Vol. XVIII. New York: Published by Order of the Trustees (1907)
- Lunde, Anders S.; "Whirligigs: Design and Construction"; Mother Earth News, 1983
- Lunde, Anders S.; Whirligigs In Silhouette: 25 New Patterns (ISBN 0866750142 / 0-86675-014-2); Modern Handicraft Inc., Kansas City, MO; 1989
- Lunde, Anders S.; Whirligigs for Children Young and Old; (ISBN 9780801982347); Chilton Book Co., Radnor, PA; 1992
- Lunde, Anders S.; Easy to Make Whirligigs; Dover Publications, 1996
- Lunde, Anders S.; Making Animated Whirligigs; Dover Publications, 1998
- Lunde, Anders S.; Whimsical Whirligigs; (ISBN 0486412334); Dover Publications, 2000
- Lunde, Anders S.; Action Whirligigs: 25 Easy-to-Do Projects; Dover Publications, 2003
- Marling, Karal Ann; Wind & Whimsy: Weathervanes and Whirligigs from Twin Cities Collections; Minneapolis Institute of Arts, 2007
- Pettit, Florence Harvey; How to Make Whirligigs and Whimmy Diddles and Other American Folkcraft Objects (ISBN 0690413890 / 0-690-41389-0); Thomas Y. Crowell, New York, New York, 1972
- Pierce, Sharon; Making Whirligigs and Other Wind Toys; (ISBN 0806979801 / 0-8069-7980-1); Sterling Pub Co Inc; New York, New York; 1985
- Powell, J.W. (Director). Ninth Annual Report of the Bureau of Ethnology to the Secretary of the Smithsonian Institution 1887-'88. Washington, D.C.: Government printing Office (1892).
- Schoonmaker, David & Woods, Bruce; Whirligigs & Weathervanes: A Celebration of Wind Gadgets With Dozens of Creative Projects to Make; Sterling/Lark, New York, 1991
- Schwartz, Renee, Wind Chimes & Whirligigs, Kids Can Press, 2007
- Skinner, Alanson. "Notes on the Eastern Cree and Northern Saulteaux", Anthropological Papers of the American Museum of Natural History, pp. 1–178. New York: Published by Order of the Trustees (1912).
- Wells, J.B. Toy Buzz. US Patent #193201. US Patent Office (May 21, 1877).
- Wiley, Jack; How to Make Propeller-Animated Whirligigs: Penguin, Folk Rooster, Dove, Pink Flamingo, Flying Unicorn & Roadrunner, Solipaz Publishing Co., 1993
