= Stikfas =

Poseable action figures

STIKFAS
- Photo of a Stikfas toy Pirate and Ninja
- Type: action figure construction set
- Company: Stikfas Pte. Ltd.
- Country: Singapore
- Availability: 2001–2010?
- Official website

STIKFAS was a series of 3.25-inch (8cm) model assembly figures or toys made by Stikfas Pte. Ltd., a now-defunct company based in Singapore. Once assembled, they could be customized with stickers (marketed as "Stikers") and parts from other sets. STIKFAS are designed so that all of the joints are moveable ball/sockets, making the figurines poseable and interchangeable.

STIKFAS were sold in kits that include accessories like weapons and pouches, and sometimes additional models such as a dragon, dog, or bicycle, keeping with the theme of the kit. STIKFAS also have small square notches on their bodies, allowing rare earth magnets to be inserted. These notches are found on the upper legs, feet, and body sections. The curved U-shaped hands are also the same diameter as the notches. Once inserted into any of these areas, the magnets allow STIKFAS to be posed while adhering to a magnetic surface, preventing them from falling over. STIKFAS have been used by the webcomic and stop motion animation community.

== Stikfas Company History ==
STIKFAS debuted in 2001 through a co-branding collaboration with the computer game publisher Electronic Arts. This collaboration provided proof of concept and STIKFAS Pte. Ltd. was incorporated in August. Work began on the first mass-production model of the STIKFAS Action Figure Kit, which was made available to the public in December 2001, through online sales at www.stikfas.com.

From 2002 to 2004, STIKFAS was licensed to Hasbro. This move saw an increase in its product range, distribution network, and market recognition. During this period, STIKFAS was awarded the title of "Best Original Concept" in "Best of the Best 2002" by Wizard's Toyfare magazine, the industry's leading publication. That year, STIKFAS came in second for "Most Fun and Innovative Toy" in Toyshop Magazine's consumer poll.

STIKFAS debuted in Japan in the fall of 2003 under the distribution of Tomy Direct Co., Ltd. In February 2005, the first comprehensive fan book about STIKFAS, its products, and the people in the company was published by Hobby Japan, the nation's leading hobby magazine since 1969. This publication reinforced the cult status that STIKFAS has in Japan.
