= Cozy Coupe =

American toy car

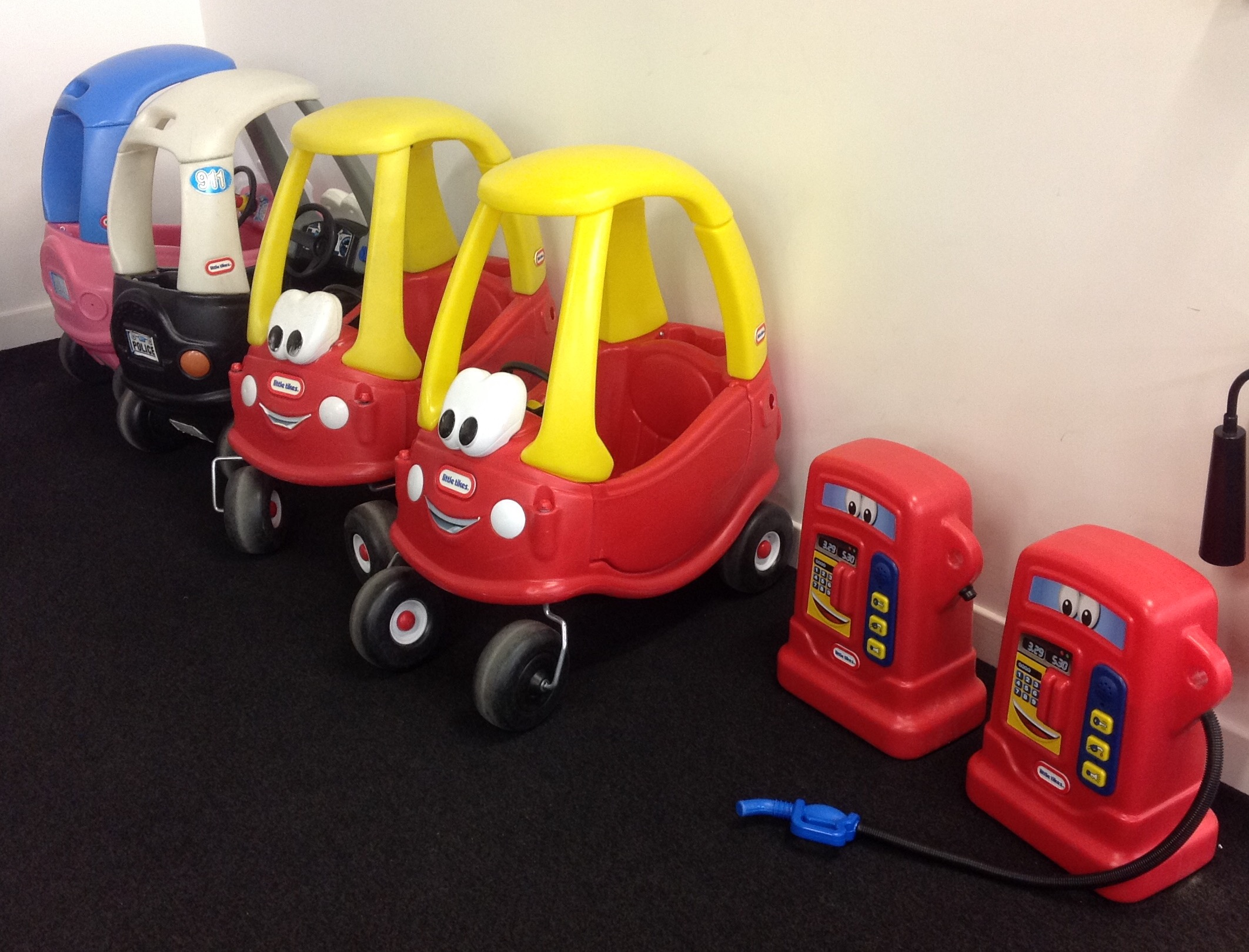
- Multiple Cozy Coupe models and accessory gas pumps at Haynes International Motor Museum
- Type: Toy car
- Invented by: Jim Mariol
- Company: Little Tikes
- Country: United States
- Availability: 1979–present
- Materials: Molded plastic

The Cozy Coupe is a red and yellow toy car manufactured and distributed by Little Tikes, an American manufacturer of children's toys based in Hudson, Ohio.

== Design ==
The car's design, described as "a cross between a Volkswagen Beetle and Fred Flintstone's vehicle", was created by Jim Mariol of Cincinnati-based manufacturer Design Alliance, who had worked as a designer at Chrysler starting in 1952 and engineered by Shirish Patel, Little Tikes' Vice President of Engineering and Product Engineer John Fawcett.

== Evolution ==
First sold in 1979 as one of the first molded-plastic toy cars sold in the United States, it was called the "world's best-selling car for much of this decade" by The New York Times in 1998, outselling the Honda Accord and Ford Taurus. By 1991, the Cozy Coupe was selling 500,000 units per year, making it the top-selling model in the United States, outselling the 399,000 Accords and 299,000 Taurus vehicles sold that year. By 1997, its sales of 313,000 units in the US and another 100,000 sold in the United Kingdom in 1997, would have made it the fifth-best-selling car in the US among non-toy vehicles.

By 1998, Tom Murdough, the founder of Little Tikes who had left the company to start competitor Step 2, had pointed out that the Cozy Coupe's design was becoming dated, looking "somewhat like the VW Beetle in looks and design", reflecting what was "a great design for its time, but it also looks like it was designed in the '70s." Little Tikes had introduced a number of brand extensions in 1996, including a purple roadster that looks akin to a Plymouth Prowler, a blue minivan that looks akin to a Dodge Caravan, an SUV, two pickup models and the yellow and teal Grand Coupe. While overall sales for Little Tikes increased after the introduction of the new models, the Cozy Coupe lost its spot as the industry's top seller.

By 1998, Little Tikes introduced the Cozy Coupe II, a redesigned model of its original classic that retained the red and yellow bubble-shaped exterior, while adding thicker pillars on the front roof, among other enhancements, including a remote control that makes sounds of doors unlocking, the horn beeping, the engine starting and a car alarm. J. C. Penney had included the updated car in its catalog starting in August 1998, with sales since its introduction doubling the sales in the corresponding five months of 1997. Total 1998 sales were expected to exceed 250,000 units. In 2009 Rakesh Patel, the owner of the first Cozy Coupe ever made, donated the very first Cozy Coupe off the assembly line from 1979 to the collection of the Crawford Auto-Aviation Museum in celebration of the coupe's 30th anniversary.

A mechanical computer mouse based on the design was released in the late 1990s, which was recalled in 2001 on the basis that the removable ball mechanism could pose as a choking hazard.
