= Space Pets =

Pneumatic-powered toys by TOMY

Space Pets were a line of pneumatic-powered toys designed, manufactured and marketed by TOMY (Takara) for the American market in the early 1980s.

== Design ==
Space Pets were powered by a small air tank that captured, compressed and controllably released air power that was converted into mechanical motion. Each Space Pet shipped with a "Tomy air pump" that was used to recharge the air tank and resembled a small bicycle pump.

The flagship model was the "High Hopping Hoomdorm", which resembled a mechanical grasshopper. Other models included the "Stretch-Legged Stoomdorm" which propelled itself in an accordion-like fashion, the "Fleet-Footed Floomdorm", and the "Lurch-Along Loomdorm".

Variations of Space Pets were sold under other names outside of the US. For example, the "High Hopping Hoomdorm" was packaged and sold as the "Sky Hopper" in the United Kingdom, while "Stretch-Legged Stoomdorm" was sold as "Lunar Legs".

The Hoomdorms were manufactured in Singapore for distribution in Australia, and manufactured in Japan for distribution in the United States.
