= Didicar =

Ride-on toy

Didicar is a self-propelled ride on toy made of polypropylene designed for children aged 3 years and up. The Didicar starts moving when the rider turns the steering wheel left and right. Thanks to the rotation of the steering wheel, the Didicar leverages its frictional force, gravity and inertia to move forward and backward. It is designed for hard, smooth or flat surfaces, both indoors and outdoors. It has no pedals, motors, batteries or greasy chains.

== Design ==
The Didicar looks like a four-wheeled scooter with a steering wheel in front. The child drives the Didicar seated on the seat with their feet resting on the front foot plates and with the legs surrounding the steering column. The Didicar has 6 wheels, 2 at the back and 4 in the front. Only the 2 rear wheels and two front Drive Wheels touch the floor. The first two wheels at the front of the front wheel assembly never touch the floor and help maintain stability and security in case the child leans forward. The larger front drive wheels of the front wheel assembly are connected to the steering wheel through a steering column. These are the wheels that move the vehicle. The rear wheels have independent rotation. The body and wheels are made of polypropylene, while roller bearings and other metal parts are made from stainless steel.

Didicar is designed for children from 3 years and adults with a maximum weight of up to 120 kg, and can reach speeds up to 6 mph. It's designed for use on hard, smooth, flat surfaces, both in indoors and outdoors. It's available in several different colours including blue, green, purple, pink, red and yellow.

== History and marketing ==
Didicar was introduced to the UK and Ireland in 2004 by Simac Marketing Ltd and is distributed in Spain and Portugal by Toycy Toys. It is sold for use as a domestic toy, as well as in schools.
