= Reuben Aaron Miller =

American folk artist

Reuben Aaron Miller (July 22, 1912 – March 7, 2006) was a self-taught folk artist, best known for his whirligigs, metal cutouts and drawings. Miller began producing outsider art late in life, placing hundreds of his completed works on his property, as well as selling them on the roadside. His work gained wider recognition in the 1980s, when it was featured in a music video, and subsequently exhibited in museums of art. Widely collected, and in constant demand, Miller is acknowledged as one of the more notable senior folk artists in the United States.

== Biography ==
=== Early years through retirement ===
The youngest of eight children, Miller was born July 22, 1912, in the East Hall County, Georgia community of Rabbittown, on the outskirts of Gainesville. Six months before he was born, his father was shot and killed over a land dispute for the control of a public road. For years after, the fatherless family "got by on farming cotton, hunting and fishing".

Miller dropped out of school at the age of 12 and went to work in a cotton mill. He also chopped wood for 50 cents a load. Later in life he served as an ordained minister for the Free Will Baptist Church. Miller retired at the age of 65, after his vision began to deteriorate due to glaucoma, and started making the whirligigs that he made as a boy to pass the time.

=== Later years as an artist ===
Miller lived out most of his life on the same property where he was born, only moving to a nursing home in his final years. His home was noted for being within "a stone's throw from the Rabbittown rabbit", a 20 ft. tall sculpture erected in 1993 to commemorate the community's namesake. Starting in the 1970s through the 1990s, Miller's property commanded attention in its own right, as Miller populated the landscape with hundreds of whirligigs and tin artwork, which he sold on the side of the road. Miller experimented with a number of themes, but the better known pieces, which he produced in numerous variations, are animals, devils, and "Blow Oscar".

=== Inspiration ===
Miller used his artwork to help spread the word of God. His materials consisted of paint, magic marker, tin, bicycle parts, and scrap metal. His work generally consisted of animal and human figures, and short inspirational messages, most notably "Lord Love You." His animal images range from bluebirds, chickens, pigs, and snakes to an assortment of dinosaur types, which were inspired by National Geographic programs on television. The Human figures include red devils, angels, culturally iconic symbols such as Uncle Sam and Elvis Presley, and more abstract characters that sport hats, cigars, or red claws. In his folk art (also referred to as outsider art), Miller's most persistent image is a figure entitled "Blow Oskar", which is based on his cousin, who would always blow his horn passionately whenever he would drive by Miller's property.

=== R.E.M. ===
Miller's artwork gained notoriety, outside of his immediate community, when his whirligigs were featured in the twenty-minute video Left of Reckoning, which was a collaboration of the Athens based rock group R.E.M. and painter and filmmaker James Herbert. Images of the "whirligigs" were also implanted into R.E.M.'s music video for the song "Pretty Persuasion."

=== Recognition and exhibitions ===
One of Miller's neighbors recollected "When he first started, we all laughed at him and said 'Who wants that junk?' When he started making money, we all wanted to help." In addition to the recognition he received from R.E.M., Miller's artwork appeared on the December 2001 cover of TV Guide. Miller began receiving visitors from overseas. His artwork, which he had sold for $5–$50 in the early years, by 2006 commanded gallery prices as high as $700–$800. Exhibitions soon followed. In 2006 Brenau University's Simmons Visual Arts Center featured his works in an exhibit titled "R.A. Miller: A Tribute." The Georgia Museum of Art organized a retrospective of Miller's work in 2009. The exhibit, titled "Lord Love You: Works by R.A. Miller from the Mullis Collection" ran August 15 through October 24, 2009. It featured 83 paintings, drawings, sculptures and whirligigs by Miller. On July 23, 2012, an exhibit and "birthday party" was held at the Quinlan Visual Arts Center, in Gainesville, Georgia to recognize the works of R.A. Miller, and to celebrate the 100th birthday of the late artist.

== Collections ==
- Art Museum of Southeast Texas, Beaumont, Texas
