= Cornelius Weygandt =

American literary scholar (1871–1957)

Cornelius Weygandt (13 December 1871—31 July 1957) was an American journalist, professor of English and Irish literature at the University of Pennsylvania, and popular author of Pennsylvania German descent.

== Bibliography ==
- Irish Plays and Playwrights (1913)
- A Century of the English Novel (1925)
- The Red Hills: A Record of Good Days Outdoors and in, with Things Pennsylvania Dutch (1929)
- The Wissahickon Hills: Memories of Leisure Hours out of Doors in an Old Countryside (Philadelphia: University of Pennsylvania, 1930)
- A Passing America: Considerations of Things of Yesterday Fast Fading from Our World (New York: Henry Holt, 1932)
- The Blue Hills: Rounds and Discoveries in the Country Places of Pennsylvania (New York: Henry Holt, 1936)
- The Time of Tennyson (1936)
- The Time of Yeats: English Poetry of to-day against an American Background (1937)
- Philadelphia Folks: Ways and Institutions in and about the Quaker City (New York: Appleton-Century, 1938).
- The Dutch Country: Folks and Treasures in the Red Hills of Pennsylvania (New York: Appleton-Century, 1939)
- The Plenty of Pennsylvania: Samples of Seven Cultures Persisting from Colonial Days (New York: H. C. Kinsey, 1942)
- On the Edge of Evening: The Autobiography of a Teacher and Writer Who Holds to the Old Ways (1946)
