= Trevor Devall =

Canadian actor (born 1972)

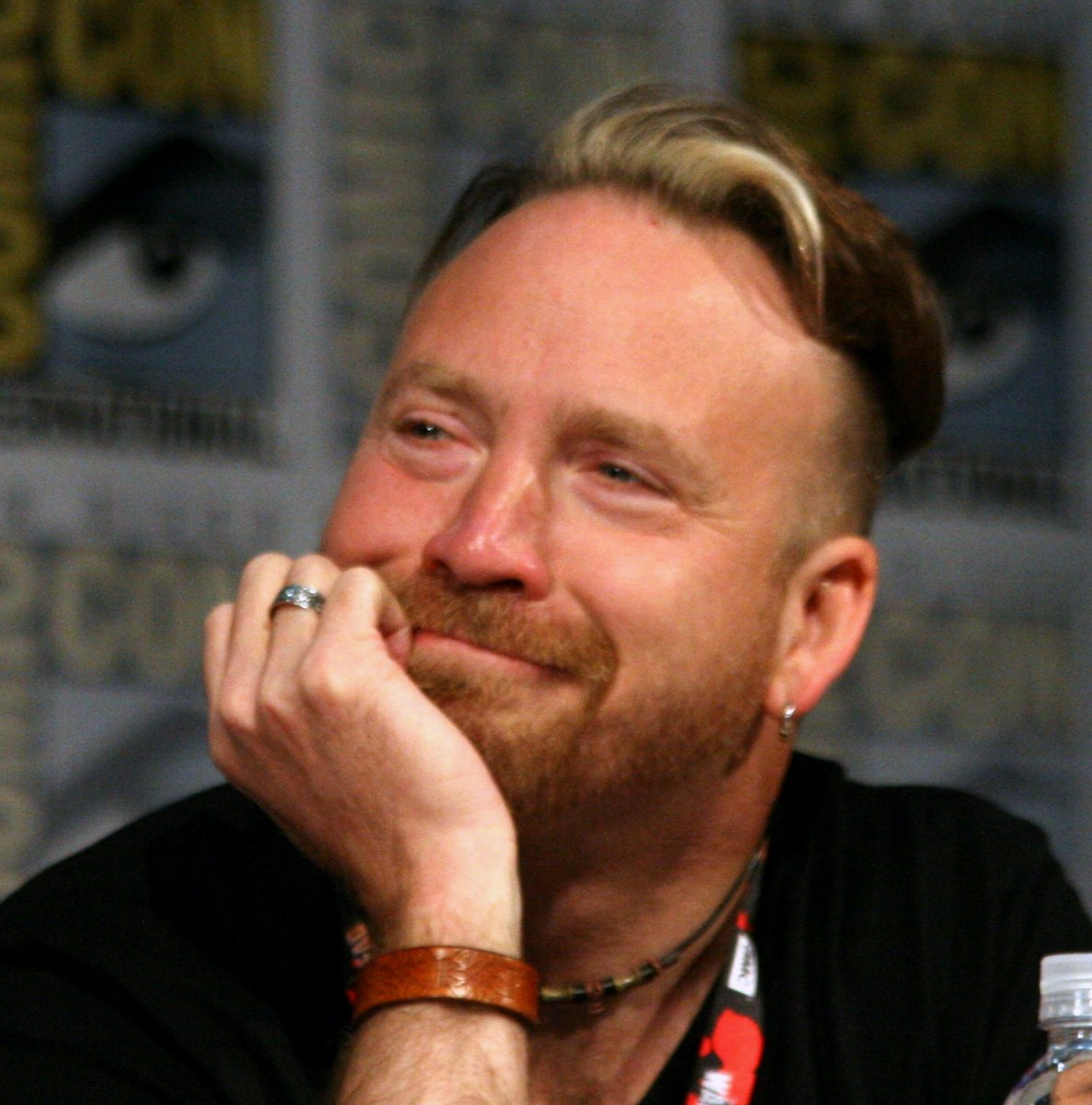
- Devall at the 2016 San Diego Comic-Con
- Born: November 10, 1972 (age 54)
- Occupations: Voice actor; podcaster
- Years active: 2000–present
- Title: Your Intrepid Host
- Website: www.trevordevall.com

Trevor Devall (born November 10, 1972) is a Canadian voice actor and podcaster. He worked for various studios in Vancouver, British Columbia, Canada for years, before he relocated to Los Angeles, California, United States in 2013. Between 2007 and 2013, he produced the podcast Voiceprint with Trevor Devall and Guests, where he interviewed other voice actors. Starting in 2019, he became more active in the tabletop role-playing games community, starting the actual play YouTube show Me, Myself and Die! where he played solo tabletop role-playing games; as well as launching a Kickstarter campaign for his own tabletop role-playing game system The Broken Empires in 2024.

== Early life ==
Trevor Devall was born on November 10, 1972, the youngest of five children to Theresa and Vernon Devall. He was into theatre and did tap, jazz, and Polynesian dance as a child. He attended the University of Alberta for drama and directed stage productions as well as student films.

Devall moved to Vancouver in 1998 to pursue a film directing career. While working for a talent agency, he made a demo tape for them and began landing work as a voice actor.

== Career ==
He is best known for voicing Hot Dog in Krypto the Superdog, Rocket Raccoon in the animated TV series Guardians of the Galaxy, Emperor Palpatine in Lego Star Wars, Pyro in X-Men: Evolution, Dukey in seasons 5 and 6 of Johnny Test, and various characters in the Netflix original series F Is for Family, as well as providing voices in English-language versions of various anime series, most notably as Mu La Flaga from Mobile Suit Gundam SEED, Mukotsu from InuYasha, Scourge from Transformers: Cybertron, Mr. Chang from Black Lagoon, and Aizawa from Death Note. He also voiced Hermiod on Stargate Atlantis and Ravus Nox Fleuret in the Final Fantasy XV video game and Kingsglaive: Final Fantasy XV feature film. Other than that, he voiced Mars in Dota 2 video game. On camera, he played Sir Atticus Moon in Big Time Movie. Devall played the voice of Rocket Raccoon in the animated Guardians of the Galaxy series and various subsequent media. He is also the voice of Ronnie in A Chuck E. Cheese Christmas.

=== Me, Myself and Die! ===
In 2019, Trevor Devall started the Me, Myself and Die! channel on YouTube, focused on actual plays of solo tabletop role-playing games, such as Savage Worlds, Ironsworn and Dominion Rules. In Me, Myself and Die!, Devall plays tabletop RPGs alone, covering both popular systems, as well as bringing attention to indie role-playing games.

The channel also features the series The Sage's Library, in which Trevor Devall reviews and discusses various tabletop role-playing games from his library. The videos cover many TTRPG systems, such as Traveller, Pathfinder or The Burning Wheel.

=== The Broken Empires ===
In October 2024, Trevor Devall started a Kickstarter campaign for his tabletop role-playing game called The Broken Empires, with the initial funding goal of US$10,000. By October 3 the project raised over $256,000 from more than 2,000 backers. The game is set in a gritty fantasy setting. Devall developed the system by picking and choosing mechanics from more than 125 other games over the course of four seasons of actual plays on his YouTube channel Me, Myself and Die!.

The game is promised to focus on exploration and intrigue, as well as to offer a lot of flexibility for the characters. One of Trevor Devall's ideas for the game is greater focus on social mechanics. He believes that some tabletop role-playing games, like The Burning Wheel, have too many mechanics for social interaction, while others, like OSR-style games, have none, and hopes to strike the right balance in The Broken Empires. For exploration mechanics, one of the major inspirations was The One Ring Roleplaying Game.

== Filmography ==
=== Animation ===
- 3-2-1 Penguins! – Flam Mingo
- A Kind of Magic – Gregor
- Action Dad – Nun Chuck, Red Skarf, Dr. Pincushion, Brick Brac, Mick's Belt Buckle, Rocky, Bomb, Scud, Red Skarf (Young), NunChuck (Young), See & Say, Cop #2 (2), Additional Voices
- Animaniacs – Additional Voices
- Animism: The Gods' Lake – Stevens, Nazi Biker (Ep. "The Hero's Journey... With Friends")
- Avengers Assemble – Rocket Raccoon (2nd voice), Ares, Grizzly
- Being Ian – Craig, Nash, Brad, 80's Station Disk Jockey, Additional Voices
- Blaze and the Monster Machines – Wartimer
- Bratz – Eitan
- Breadwinners – Trash Bandit, Oonski's Father, Super Duck, Captain Scurvybeak
- Carmen Sandiego – Roundabout
- Cat Burglar – Museum Director
- Class of the Titans – Apollo, Hades, King Minos, Thanatos, Adonis
- Costume Quest – Grubbin Levi, Chad, Announcer, Bodyguard #1, Crowd, Dave Grubbin, Dave Monster, Camera Man, KAHN News Announcer, Male Security Guard, Grubbin, Grubbins, Monster, Monster Chad, Security Guard, Old Folk
- The Deep – Devil Daniels, Fisherman #2
- Dinosaur Train – Boris Tyrannosaurus, Mr. Deinonychus, Thurston Troodon, Bucky Masiakasaurus
- Dinotrux – Garby, Skrap-It, Lloyd, Scoot, Craneosaur #1 (3)
- Dragon Booster – Moordryd Paynn, Captain Faier, Wulph, Shadow Booster
- Dreamkix – Sean, Pontelette, Maurice, Rabbit Anchor, Auditioning Rabbit
- Elena of Avalor – Nathaniel
- The Epic Tales of Captain Underpants – Smartsy Fartsy
- Fantastic Four: World's Greatest Heroes – Diablo
- F Is for Family – Holtenwasser, Red the Baggage Handler, Bolo, Greg, Mr. Goomer, Bing Crosby TV Announcer, Game Show Announcer, Cement Worker, Raymond Trentelle / Irish Cop, Carnival Ring Toss Employee, Additional Voices
- Firehouse Tales – Additional voices
- The Ghost and Molly McGee – Weird Larry, Irving the Illusionist
- Guardians of the Galaxy – Rocket Raccoon, Black Bolt, Fandral, Ranger
- Hanazuki: Full of Treasures – Basil Ganglia
- Hero: 108 – Spotter, Nain
- He-Man and the Masters of the Universe – Beast Man / R’Qazz, Bash
- Hydee and the Hytops – Zeke in The Snake Claws
- I Am Groot - Iwua
- Inhumans Motion Comics – Stalyenko, Alpha 1, Namor the Sub-Mariner, Rexel Toiven
- Jeff and Some Aliens – Anchor
- Johnny Test – Dukey the Dog (Seasons 5–6), Mr. Teacherman (Season 5), Additional Voices (Season 2)
- Johnny Test – Dukey the Dog, additional voices
- Justice League Action – Cain, Jonah Hex
- Kid vs. Kat – Burt Burtonburger
- Krypto the Superdog – Hot Dog
- Lego Marvel Avengers: Mission Demolition – Rocket Raccoon, Klaw, Popcorn Suit Vendor
- Lego Marvel Avengers: Strange Tails - Sabertooth, Klaw, Dry Cleaner Owner
- Lego Star Wars: Droid Tales – Emperor Palpatine, Admiral Ackbar, Jar Jar Binks, Jango Fett, Tion Medon, Boba Fett, Nien Nunb, Bib Fortuna, additional voices
- Lego Star Wars: The Freemaker Adventures – Emperor Sheev Palpatine, Admiral Ackbar, additional voices
- Lego Star Wars: The Yoda Chronicles – Emperor Sheev Palpatine, Ackbar, Bib Fortuna, Tion Medon, Salacious Crumb, Jar Jar Binks, Admiral Piett, Royal Guard
- The Little Prince – Coppelius (The Planet of the Oracle), Joseph (The Planet of Libris), Zig (The Planet of Carapodes)
- The Loud House – Various voices
- Marvel Super Hero Adventures – Rocket Raccoon
- Max Steel – Jim McGrath, Metal Elementor, Mega Elementor
- Miles from Tomorrowland – Galaxel
- My Little Pony: Friendship Is Magic – Thunderlane, Iron Will, Fancy Pants, Fedora-Wearing Clover Pony, Hoity Toity, Luggage Cart, Hayseed Turnip Truck, Golden Gavel, Mr. Zippy, Instructional Film Announcer, Fluffy Clouds, Additional Voices
- My Little Pony: Pony Life – Gummy, TV Producer Pony, Fancy Pants
- The Powerpuff Girls – Additional Voices
- Pupstruction - Herman S. Crably, Husky
- Regular Show – HD DVD, Stream Box Bot 1
- Scooby-Doo and Guess Who? – Max Kilobyte, Cameraman, Weatherly
- Slugterra – The King of Sling, Vance Volt, The Gentleman, Waiter, Additional Voices
- Sofia the First – Gunk, Sir Henley
- Spider-Man – Blizzard, Paladin
- Spidey and His Amazing Friends – Rocket Raccoon
- Star Wars Rebels – Hobbie, Additional Voices
- Superbook – Marianus, Eliab, Jesse, Jodas, Vendor, Joshua, Captain of the Guard, Guard, Older Brother, Pharisee 2, Aaron's Dad, Hatach, King Xerxes, Young Servant, Mourners and Followers, Pilate
- Supernoobs – Count Venamus
- Teen Titans Go! – Old Man, Spy Villain, Whimsy Starfire, Whimsy Beast Boy
- ThunderCats Roar – Slithe, Safari Joe
- The Tom and Jerry Show – Toodles' Dad, Stinker, Clerk, Shop Owner, Delivery Guy, Donnie, Gerald, The Invisible Cat, Police Chief, Western Narrator, Lawyer
- Tom and Jerry Tales – Radio Announcer, Thomas Jefferson, El Presidente
- Transformers: Robots in Disguise – Hermit, Patrolman #2
- TripTank – Edmund, Billy John
- Ultimate Spider-Man – Rocket Raccoon (2nd voice)
- Ultimate Wolverine vs. Hulk Motion Comics – Steve Rogers, S.H.I.E.L.D. Agent, George
- Underworld: Endless War – Kraven, Darius, Lord Clovis
- VeggieTales – Espresso, Old Man Zucchini
- Vixen – Drake, Jones
- Voltron: Legendary Defender – Antok, Keith's Dad, Galra Druid
- Wolverine: Weapon X Motion Comics – Bucky Barnes, Nightcrawler, Cyclops, Luke Cage, David Heimerdinger
- Wolverine vs. Sabretooth Motion Comics – Sasquatch, Captain America, Professor Thorton, Cyclops
- X-Men: Evolution – St. John Allerdyce/Pyro
- Zeke's Pad – Alvin Palmer, Ike Palmer, RJ Sloan, Stanley Steele, News Reader, Sketch, Peter, Calvin, Izzy, Bouncer, Additional Voices

=== Anime ===
- Aggretsuko – Himuro
- Ayakashi: Samurai Horror Tales – Odajima, Yahei
- Black Lagoon series – Mr. Chang, Leigharch, Yoshida, Neo-Nazi 1 (Ep. 6), NGO Worker (Ep. 7), Thai Man (Ep. 8) (also Roberta's Blood Trail OVAs
- Brain Powered – Edgar
- Cannon Busters – Quizmaster, Fetter, Batty, Additional Voices
- Elemental Gelade – Gladias
- Earth Maiden Arjuna – Black S.E.E.D. Soldier, Dance Mania Electric Hour DJ, Doctor, Power Plant Controller #1, S.E.E.D. HQ Controller, S.E.E.D. Official #4, White S.E.E.D. Soldier
- Galaxy Angel A – Octopus (Ep. 21)
- Ghost in the Shell: Stand Alone Complex OVAs – Togusa
- Great Pretender – James Coleman
- Hamtaro – Kana's Father (Conrad Iwata)
- Hikaru No Go – America's Representative, Kosuke's Grandfather, Toshiki Adachi
- Human Crossing – Michio Midorikawa, Cafe Owner, Kamano, Man at Party A, Shimada
- Infinite Ryvius – Analyst
- Inuyasha – Genbu, Ryūkotsusei, Mukotsu, Samurai Leader (Ep. 5), Satsuki's Brother, Shako, Shima's Father, Shinosuke, Villager (Ep. 1), Rōrō (Ep. 102)
- Kurozuka – Karuta, Man in Black
- Last Hope – Hao Wang
- Little Witch Academia – Mr. Holbrooke, Police Officer (Ep. 9)
- Maison Ikkoku – Restaurant Owner
- Marvel Future Avengers – Loki
- Master Keaton – Olaf Helmer (Ep. 35), Adult Student, Conductor, Franco, Reporter
- MegaMan NT Warrior – Mr. Match, Heimlich, Drillman
- MegaMan NT Warrior Axess – Mr. Match, Dr. Regal, Misaki
- Melty Lancer – Additional Voices
- Mobile Suit Gundam – Tem Ray
- Mobile Suit Gundam SEED – Mu La Flaga
- Mobile Suit Gundam SEED Destiny – Neo Roanoke, Mu La Flaga
- Mobile Suit Gundam 00 – Patrick Colasour, Howard Mason
- Nurse Witch Komugi – Shiro Mibu
- Ōban Star-Racers – Ondai
- Powerpuff Girls Z – Principal, various
- Project ARMS – Claw
- Ranma ½ – Mushroom Temple Lord
- Ronin Warriors – Fight Announcer (Message), Gas Station Attendant (Legend of the Inferno Armor), Police Officer (Legend of the Inferno Armor), Radio DJ (Legend of the Inferno Armor), Show Promoter (Message), UN Rep (Message), Uncle Chin (Gaiden)
- Saint Seiya: The Lost Canvas – The Myth of Hades – Griffon Minos
- Shakugan no Shana – Friagne, Marcosias (Season 1)
- Silent Möbius – Ganossa Maximillian
- Star Ocean EX – Ernest Raviede, Gyoro, Mars Elder, Shaizen, Additional Voices
- Tetsujin 28-go – Kaneda, Man in Black
- The SoulTaker – Shiro Mibu
- The Story of Saiunkoku – Enjun Sa (young), Guard 1, Official 2, Sa Family Member 3, Soldier 3
- Tokyo Underground – Emilia's Uncle, Officer, Researcher
- Transformers: Cybertron – Scourge, Megatron (Fallen)
- Transformers: Energon – Alpha Q, All The Terrorcon Units, Bruticus Maximus
- Ultraviolet: Code 044 – Ferdinand Daxus II
- Zoids: New Century Zero – Backdraft Official
- Zoids: Fuzors – Rotten Roger

=== Live-action ===
- Big Time Movie – Atticus Moon
- Henry Danger: The Movie - Blackout
- Stargate Atlantis – Hermiod
- Stargate SG-1 – Kvasir

=== Films ===
Year	Title	Role	Notes
2002	Escaflowne	Shesta	English dub
2003	Bionicle: Mask of Light	Pohatu	Direct-to-video
2004	G.I. Joe: Valor vs. Venom	Wild Weasel	Direct-to-video
2004	Bionicle 2: Legends of Metru Nui	Nuju	Direct-to-video
2005	Ark	Baramanda	
2005	Bionicle 3: Web of Shadows	Nuju, Rahaga, Iruini	Direct-to-video
2007	Tom and Jerry: A Nutcracker Tale	Lackey	Direct-to-video
2008	Sword of the Stranger	Isogai	English dub
2011	Underworld: Endless War	Lycan Darius, Vampires Kraven, Lord Clovis	
2013	Escape from Planet Earth	Hazmats	
2014	Slugterra: Ghoul from Beyond	The King of Sling	
2014	Grumpy Cat's Worst Christmas Ever	Wilson the Cockatoo	
2015	Mune: Guardian of the Moon	Sohone, Zucchini	
2015	Batman vs. Robin	Jack	Direct-to-video
2015	Justice League: Gods and Monsters	Emil Hamilton	Direct-to-video
2015	Marvel Super Hero Adventures: Frost Fight!	Rocket Raccoon, J.A.R.V.I.S., Malitri	Direct-to-video
2016	Open Season: Scared Silly	Shaw, Werewolf, Deputy #2	Direct-to-video
2016	Kingsglaive: Final Fantasy XV	Ravus Nox Fleuret	English dub
2017	The Jetsons & WWE: Robo-WrestleMania!	Elroy Jetson	Direct-to-video
2017	Batman and Harley Quinn	Bobby Liebowitz	Direct-to-video
2018	Suicide Squad: Hell to Pay	Punch	Direct-to-video
2018	The Death of Superman	Bruno Mannheim, Dabney Donovan	Direct-to-video
2018	Lego DC Comics Super Heroes: Aquaman – Rage of Atlantis	Ocean Master	Direct-to-video
2019	Reign of the Supermen	Dabney Donovan, Snakey Doyle, G. Gordon Godfrey	Direct-to-video
2019	Abominable	Van Driver	
2020	Dragon Quest: Your Story	Slon the Rook, Frank	English dub
2020	The Lego Star Wars Holiday Special	Emperor Palpatine	
2021	Lego Star Wars: Terrifying Tales	Emperor Palpatine, Grand Moff Tarkin	
2022	Tom and Jerry: Cowboy Up	Duke	Direct-to-video
2022	Lego Star Wars: Summer Vacation	Emperor Palpatine, Wuher	
2023	Justice League: Warworld	Drifter	Direct-to-video
2025	A Chuck E. Cheese Christmas	Leggymos, Ronnie, Party Store Employee	

- Junkers Come Here – Photographer (English dub)
- Mobile Suit Gundam: Char's Counterattack – Adenaur Paraya (English dub)

=== Video games ===
- Agents of Mayhem – Agent Hollywood (Rod Stone)
- Dota 2 – Mars
- Fallout 76: Steel Dawn – Brotherhood Hopefuls/Initiates
- Final Fantasy XV – Ravus Nox Fleuret
- Final Fantasy VII Remake – Andrea Rhodea
- Frogger's Adventures: The Rescue – Ranger Frog, TRIP Boss
- Frogger: Ancient Shadow – Dr. Wani, Mohan
- Halo 5: Guardians – Additional voices
- Hi-Fi Rush – PA-D0, TEC-78
- Infamous First Light – Additional voices
- Mafia III – Additional voices
- Marvel Cosmic Invasion – Rocket Raccoon, MODOK, Sauron
- Marvel Powers United VR – Rocket Raccoon, Kree Soldier
- Marvel vs. Capcom: Infinite – Rocket Raccoon
- Mass Effect: Andromeda – Additional voices
- Mobile Suit Gundam: Encounters in Space – Orteg
- Nickelodeon All-Star Brawl 2 – Vlad Masters
- Order of the Sinking Star – Magistrate Reynard, The Caver's Cousin
- Rise of the Tomb Raider – Additional voices
- Skylanders: Imaginators – Buckshot
- Trinity: Souls of Zill Ơll – Orphaus
- Under the Skin – Walla Group

=== Voiceprint with Trevor Devall and Guests ===
Between 2007 and 2013, Devall produced his own podcast, Voiceprint with Trevor Devall and Guests, where he interviewed fellow Vancouver-based voice actors and answered questions from fans. Each episode featured a different voice actor as the episode guest, though some episodes featured other people in the voice-acting business that may not actually be voice actors themselves; or behind-the-scenes looks at the life of a voice actor. Topics usually included how the guest made it into the voice-acting business, what it is like working in the industry, and the general lifestyle of a voice actor. The series concluded after 36 episodes in December 2013. Devall stated in the final episode that he hoped to continue the show with a "second season" following his move to Los Angeles, but this has not come to pass.

Voiceprint with Trevor Devall & Guests
Episode	Guest	Notes	Release Date
1	Sam Vincent	Premiere episode	July 16, 2007
2	Michael Dobson		July 25, 2007
3	Matt Hill		August 7, 2007
4	Vic Mignogna	Live interview at Animethon in Edmonton.	August 14, 2007
5	Kelly Sheridan		August 28, 2007
6	Brian Dobson		September 12, 2007
7	Brad Swaile		October 12, 2007
8	Scott McNeil		October 25, 2007
9	Karl Willems & Mike Iske	Director & Technician at Ocean Studios	November 15, 2007
10	Brian Drummond		November 27, 2007
11	Ian Corlett		February 20, 2008
12	Tabitha St. Germain		March 8, 2008
13	Behind the Toronto Con	A travel documentary by Devall and Brian Dobson of their experiences at Toronto AnimeCon, held March 15–16, 2008 in Toronto, ON. Features guest appearances by Kirby Morrow and Chris Patton.	March 27, 2008
14	Terry Klassen		April 24, 2008
15	Maryke Hendrikse		May 22, 2008
16	Colin Murdock		September 26, 2008
17	Richard Ian Cox		October 17, 2008
18	Lee Tockar		December 2, 2008
19	Kirby Morrow		December 25, 2008
20	Secret Toy Surprise	Podcast Commentary for: Gundam SEED episode 30 "Flashing Blades" with Sam Vincent; Death Note episode 13 "Confession" with Brian Drummond & Brad Swaile.	March 2, 2009
21	James Corrigall	Director at Ocean Studios.	May 12, 2009
22	Cathy Weseluck		August 5, 2009
23	Kyle Hebert	Live interview at Matsuricon 2009 in Columbus, OH.	September 14, 2009
24	Alessandro Juliani		November 3, 2009
25	Garry Chalk		December 5, 2009
26	Intermission	Featuring Sam Vincent, Kirby Morrow, and Gardiner Millar	September 8, 2010
27	Chiara Zanni		September 23, 2010
28	Paul Dobson		December 17, 2010
29	Voltron Force!	From Koko Productions Studio during the recording of the final episode of the new Voltron. Featuring the voices of Sam Vincent, Andrew Francis, Ron Halder, Ashleigh Ball, Ty Olsson, Giles Panton, Vincent Tong, Doron Bell Jr., Shannon Chan-Kent, and show producer Jeremy Corray.	March 16, 2011
30	Lisa Ann Beley		July 1, 2011
31	James Arnold Taylor	Recorded in West Hollywood, CA	September 21, 2011
32	David Kaye	Recorded in West Hollywood, CA	November 25, 2011
33	Andrew Francis		May 2, 2012
34	Mark Oliver		October 1, 2012
35	Andrea Libman		February 6, 2013
36	Trevor Devall	Finale; In a reversal of roles, Devall was interviewed by series premiere guest Sam Vincent.	December 23, 2013

=== Web series ===
- Me, Myself and Die! – Player, GM, and Host
