= Superbook (2011 TV series) =

- Also known as: Superbook Reimagined
- Genre: Christian media; Adventure; Science fiction; Fantasy
- Directed by: Tom Bancroft; Rob Corley; Bryant Paul Richardson; Tony Bancroft; Craig Grasso; Jerry Yu Ching; Robert Kirbyson
- Voices of: Samuel Vincent; Shannon Chan-Kent; Cathy Weseluck; Colin Murdock; Jan Rabson; Nicole Oliver; Noel Johansen; Jim Conrad
- Theme music composer: Mark Hammond (lyrics by Marty Goetz)
- Opening theme: "Superbook Theme Song"
- Ending theme: "The Salvation Poem" by Matt & Sherry McPherson
- Composer: Kurt Heinecke
- Countries of origin: United States; Japan
- Original language: English
- No. of seasons: 5
- No. of episodes: 68

Production
- Executive producer: Gordon Robertson
- Producers: Bryant P. Richardson; Sean Roche; John J. Schafer and others
- Editor: Bryant Paul Richardson
- Running time: 26 minutes
- Production companies: Daysview Digital Image (seasons 1–3); Toiion Animation Studios (seasons 3–5); Xentrix Studios (season 5)

Original release
- Network: Tokyo MX (Japan); CBN Smile Daystar ABC Family/Freeform (United States)
- Release: September 1, 2011 – April 4, 2021

Related
- Superbook (1981)

Superbook (also known as Superbook Reimagined) is a Christian animated television series produced for Christian Broadcasting Network (CBN) with Asia-Pacific region animation studios along with locally based partners like Tokyo MX and Word of Life Press Ministries in Japan. It is a reboot of the original series of the same name.

The series started on September 1, 2011, and ended on April 4, 2021, having five seasons and 68 episodes and was aired on Tokyo MX in Japan, ABC Family/Freeform, Daystar and the Trinity Broadcasting Network's Smile in the United States. Together, they are considered to be among the most successful animated collaborative Japanese and American media franchises. The series currently streams for free on Prime Video, the Superbook Kid's Bible App, the Superbook YouTube channel (run by CBN) and on Yippee TV, a Christian-based American children's subscription video on-demand over-the-top streaming service.

== Synopsis ==
When best friends Chris and Joy have a problem along with their robot named Gizmo, they uncover the secrets of Superbook through a mysterious portal to the past, traveling back in Biblical times from the eras of the Old Testament and the New Testament to solve them.

== Cast and characters ==
=== Main ===
- Christopher "Chris" Quantum (voiced by Sam Vincent): The friend of Joy, the owner of Gizmo, the son of Professor Quantum and Phoebe, and a student at Valleyview Middle School.
- Joy Pepper (voiced by Shannon Chan-Kent): The friend of Chris and Gizmo, who studies at Valleyview Middle School.
- Gizmo (voiced by Cathy Weseluck): The robot of Chris from Professor Quantum.
- Superbook (voiced by Colin Murdock): The device that takes Chris, Joy, and Gizmo through a mysterious portal to the past, travelling back in the Old and New Testament era during biblical times.

=== Recurring ===
- Professor Crispin Quantum (voiced by Jan Rabson): The father of Chris and the husband of Phoebe.
- Phoebe Quantum (voiced by Nicole Oliver): The mother of Chris and the wife of Crispin.
- Todd (voiced by Cathy Weseluck): The antagonistic rival to Chris and a cheating student at Valleyview Middle School.
- Jason (voiced by Brian Drummond): A reformed kid robber, who formerly steals from Chris' house.
- Jay (voiced by Michael Donovan): A classmate of Chris.
- Mitch (voiced by Brian Drummond): A classmate of Chris.
- Sharon Myers (voiced by Kathleen Barr): A former bully thief at the Valleyview Middle School.
- Janice (voiced by Keegan Connor Tracy): The president of the Girls' Leadership Club.
- Mrs. Pepper (voiced by Cathy Weseluck): The mother of Joy.
- Pearce (voiced by Michael Adamthwaite): The leader of the Skateboard Maniacs.
- Mr. Pepper (voiced by Colin Murdock): The father of Joy.

=== Guest ===
- Ranger Granger (voiced by Colin Murdock): The park ranger at the Quantum family camp.
- Barry (voiced by Alan Marriott): A bully who intimidates Tommy until Chris confronts him at the Valleyview Skateboard Park.
- Tommy (voiced by Aidan Drummond): A victim of Barry, who Chris defends.
- Miraculo (voiced by Colin Murdock): A fake magician, who Chris exposes.
- Will (voiced by Matt Hill): A bandmate of Chris.
- Principal Travis (voiced by Kathleen Barr): The principal of the Valleyview Middle School.
- Gizmo's Parrot (voiced by Sam Vincent): The parrot of Gizmo.
- Becky (voiced by Nicole Oliver): The partner of Joy for a science project.
- Bonnie Scott (voiced by Cathy Weseluck): The new girl in the wheelchair, who Joy nominates for the club.

== Episodes ==
Seasons	Episodes	Originally released	
Seasons	Episodes	First released	Last released
1	13	September 1, 2011	April 5, 2013
2	13	June 24, 2013	September 19, 2014
3	13	January 13, 2015	February 13, 2017
4	13	June 24, 2017	June 25, 2019
5	16	September 1, 2019	April 4, 2021

=== Season 1 (2011–13) ===
No. overall	No. in series	Title	Directed by	Written by	Original release date
1	1	"In the Beginning" "The Story of Creation"	Bryant Paul Richardson	Len Uhley	September 1, 2011
Superbook narrates how God created the heavens and the Earth in the beginning. In the present, Chris Quantum disobeys his father, Professor Crispin, by sneaking into the Quantum lab to look at his father's latest invention, a jetpack. After using it and causing a huge mess in the lab, Chris is ashamed. Superbook whisks him, alongside his friend Joy Pepper and his robot Gizmo, to Heaven, where they witness the fall of Lucifer, who becomes Satan following the rebellion against God and battle with Michael. Superbook then takes the trio to the Garden of Eden to meet the first humans, Adam and Eve. Transforming into the Serpent, Satan arrives at Eden and tempts Eve to eat the forbidden fruit of the Tree of the Knowledge of Good and Evil. Eve eats the forbidden fruit and gives some to Adam, disobeying God. Adam and Eve are ashamed of their nakedness as they cover themselves and hide from God. Knowing everything, God curses Adam, Eve and Satan. Stationing cherubim to guard the Tree of Life, God banishes Adam and Eve from Eden. Returning home, Chris asks for forgiveness from his father, and Professor Crispin forgives him. Cast: Brian Dobson as Michael, Paul Dobson as Lucifer / Satan / Serpent, Kirby Morrow as Adam, Keegan Connor Tracy as Eve, and Jim Conrad as God.
2	2	"The Test!" "Abraham and Isaac"	Bryant Paul Richardson	Michael Merton	January 25, 2012
In ancient Hebron, God makes a covenant with Abraham. In the present, Chris feels guilty about the sick boy at the local hospital wanting a Holo9, which is his birthday gift. Superbook whisks him, Joy, and Gizmo to Hebron, where they meet Isaac and his father, Abraham, who recalls how the three visitors, that include Jesus, affirm the promise of a child for Abraham and his wife Sarah. Taking Isaac, Abraham goes to Mount Moriah to make a burnt offering. Discovering through Gizmo that God tells Abraham to sacrifice Isaac the day before, the trio hurries to pursue Abraham and Isaac. Arriving at the altar, Abraham binds Isaac. At the other side of the mountain, Chris, Joy, and Gizmo witness how God calls Abraham to prevent him from sacrificing Isaac and God provides Abraham a ram as the burnt offering. Returning home, Chris gives the Holo9 to the sick boy, and Debbie, the nurse, gives him a raffle wristband for a game unit. Cast: Richard Newman as Abraham, Michael Daingerfield as Isaac, Jim Conrad as God, and Noel Johansen as Jesus / Visitor.
3	3	"Jacob and Esau" "The Stolen Birthright"	Bryant Paul Richardson	David Ehrman	March 1, 2012
In the Quantum yard, during a water fight, Joy accidentally gets Gizmo wet, who suddenly believes he belongs to her, making Chris furious at her. Superbook whisks them to the Negev Desert, where they meet the twin brothers Jacob and Esau. Their father, Isaac, favors Esau, the firstborn, while their mother, Rebekah, favors Jacob, who recalls God asserting Esau will serve Jacob. After an unsuccessful hunt, Esau demands that Jacob, who deceives to sell his birthright in exchange for a stew, give up his birthright. Superbook takes the trio forward on time to Haran, where they rejoin Jacob, who argues with his father-in-law, Laban. As Jacob tells the kids how he tricks Isaac into giving him his brother's blessing and then flees into Haran, he prepares to meet Esau again, following God's instruction. At dawn, Jacob wrestles with God, that is, Jesus, who changes his name to Israel and blesses him, naming the place Peniel. Facing each other, Esau forgives Jacob, and they reconcile. Upon returning, Chris forgives Joy and fixes Gizmo. Cast: Andrew Kavadas as Jacob, Michael Adamthwaite as Esau, French Tickner as Isaac, Maxine Miller as Rebekah, and Noel Johansen as Jesus / Angel of the Lord.
4	4	"Let My People Go!" "The Story of Exodus"	Bryant Paul Richardson	Cydne Clark and Steve Granat	April 1, 2012
Chris, Joy, and Gizmo argue about their best Superbook trip ever. Superbook whisks them to Midian, where they meet Moses, a Hebrew refugee and a shepherd, who is a former prince of Egypt. At Mount Sinai, God, who reveals himself as the God of his ancestors, calls him from a burning bush and sends him to the Pharaoh to lead Israel out of Egypt with the sign of Moses' staff. After Moses reunites with his brother Aaron, they confront the Pharaoh, who refuses to let Israel go. Returning to the Pharaoh, Moses and Aaron give him the sign of Aaron's staff becoming a serpent. As the Pharaoh refuses to let Israel go, the land of Egypt suffers the Ten Plagues, leading to him letting Israel go. During the final plague, Moses instructs Israel on the Passover and leads them out of Egypt. Regretting his decision, the Pharaoh and his army pursue the Israelites to the Red Sea. With the Israelites trapped and hearing God's direction, Moses parts the Red Sea, and the Israelites cross over. As the army approaches, Moses closes the sea, drowning the Egyptians. Returning home, the trio agrees that the recent adventure is the best. Cast: Jim Conrad as God, Richard Newman as Moses, Michael Kopsa as Aaron, and Paul Dobson as Pharaoh.
5	5	"The Ten Commandments" "Moses and the Law"	Bryant Paul Richardson	Cydne Clark and Steve Granat	May 3, 2012
During his family camp, Chris adventurously ignores the rules, getting himself, Joy, and Gizmo trapped inside a cave. Superbook whisks them to the Sinai Desert in the 2nd millennium BC, where they meet Moses, Aaron, and the Israelites, who receive bread from heaven, which they call Manna. God gives his commandments as Moses consecrates the Israelites at Mount Sinai, but the Israelites beg Moses to speak to them instead. Going up to the mountain to receive the commandments, Moses leaves Aaron in charge of the people. Impatient with Moses not returning, the Israelites decide to carve a god with their ornaments as Aaron reluctantly helps them. God delivers the Ten Commandments to Moses at the mountain, written on two stone tablets. Coming back to the camp and seeing the Israelites celebrating and worshiping their Golden Calf, Moses smashes the stone tablets and destroys the golden calf. As Moses intercedes for the Israelites, God renews his covenant and gives two new stone tablets. Upon returning, the trio is found by Ranger Granger and Chris' parents, with Chris acknowledging his guilt. Cast: Jim Conrad as God, Richard Newman as Moses, and Michael Kopsa as Aaron.
6	6	"A Giant Adventure!" "David and Goliath"	Rob Corley and Tom Bancroft	Brian Cochran and Sean Gaffney	September 9, 2011
In ancient Bethlehem, Prophet Samuel anoints a young shepherd named David, the youngest son of Jesse, to be the new king of Israel. In the present, Chris is discouraged from playing the guitar in front of the crowd. Superbook whisks him, Joy, and Gizmo to the Valley of Elah, where they meet David, who takes down an offensive bear. Accompanying David to the battle camp between the Israelites and the Philistines, the trio witness Goliath, a giant from Gath, taunting the army of Israel. After reprimanding his oldest brother Eliab, David presents and proves himself to King Saul to fight Goliath. That night, David plays his harp and encourages Chris to play the guitar for God. With five smooth stones and a sling, David confronts Goliath while the latter ridicules the former. David hurls a stone with his slingshot that hits Goliath's forehead, stumbling the giant and making the Philistines flee, and David triumphs. Upon returning, Chris overcomes his fear and plays the guitar in front of the audience. Cast: Colin Murdock as the Commander, Alessandro Juliani as David, Paul Dobson as Goliath and Saul, Scott McNeil as Samuel, and Trevor Devall as Eliab and Jesse.
7	7	"Roar!" "Daniel and the Lions' Den"	Bryant Paul Richardson	Mark Steele	October 24, 2012
At the Valleyview Skateboard Park, Chris struggles to do the right thing when the bully, Barry, harasses the boy, Tommy. Superbook whisks Chris, Joy, and Gizmo to ancient Babylon in approximately 500 BC, where they witness the advisers of King Darius jealously plotting against Daniel, who is the King's friend. Following the announcement of King Darius' decree of praying only to him under the direction of the other advisers, the trio goes to Daniel's house to warn him of the law. Daniel continues to pray to God, teaching Joy how to pray too, but the palace guards arrest him. King Darius hesitantly complies with the decree, throwing Daniel into the lions' den. That night, King Darius doesn't sleep while the trio prays for Daniel. The next day, the King hurries to the lions' den, calling for Daniel. Being lifted from the den, Daniel responds and recognizes God. Then, King Darius addresses the other advisers. Upon returning, Chris stands up for Tommy against Barry. Cast: Michael Kopsa as Daniel and Mark Oliver as Darius.
8	8	"The First Christmas"	Bryant Paul Richardson	Len Uhley	December 25, 2012
The wise men reach ancient Jerusalem from the East by the star. In the present, Chris goes to the mall for the Christmas raffle after ignoring the nativity scene, unaware of the true meaning of Christmas. Superbook whisks him, Joy, and Gizmo to Jerusalem, where they encounter King Herod speaking with the wise men who seek to worship the King of the Jews, but King Herod secretly plans to find the infant king. Superbook takes the trio on the road, where they meet a couple from Nazareth, a pregnant Mary and her husband, Joseph, during the census of Quirinius. Mary recounts the announcement of the birth of Jesus by the Angel Gabriel. Entering Bethlehem, Mary and Joseph stay at the stable as no lodging is available. As Mary is about to give birth, Chris is bothered about the situation, but the trio witnesses the annunciation to the shepherds by the Angel Gabriel on the outskirts of Bethlehem. Going back to the stable, Chris, Joy, and Gizmo, alongside the shepherds and the wise men, meet the newborn baby Jesus with Mary and Joseph. Upon returning, Chris fully understands the true meaning of Christmas. Cast: Brian Dobson as Joseph and Wise Man #2, Teryl Rothery as Mary, Colin Murdock as Herod, Sam Vincent as Wise Man #1, and Michael Dobson as Wise Man #3.
9	9	"Miracles of Jesus"	Bryant Paul Richardson	Len Uhley	September 29, 2012
As Chris begins to believe the supposed miracles of a street magician named Miraculo, Superbook whisks him, alongside Joy and Gizmo, to ancient Capernaum in Galilee, where they meet Jesus of Nazareth, who heals a paralytic at a house, and Satan tries to oppose him. The trio joins the crowds as Jesus teaches them the Parable of the Sower. At a campfire, after discussing teachings and miracles with Jesus, Chris asks about the sign of Jesus' power to his disciple Simon Peter. Sailing to the region of the Gadarenes, Jesus, the disciples, and the trio experience a storm on the Sea of Galilee caused by Satan. As the disciples wake up Jesus, who is sleeping, he rebukes them of their faith and calms the storm. Coming across the tombs in the region of the Gadarenes, they encounter a demoniac who begs Jesus from torture and identifies himself as Legion. He heals the demoniac, casting out Legion and sending it to the pigs, enraging Satan. Jesus tells Chris to tell others about him. Upon returning, Chris exposes Miraculo's fake tricks. Cast: Noel Johansen as Jesus, Sam Vincent as the Possessed Man, Brian Drummond as Simon Peter and the Paralytic, Paul Dobson as Satan, and Colin Murdock as Herder #1.
10	10	"The Last Supper"	Bryant Paul Richardson	Sean Gaffney	December 2, 2012
Chris becomes arrogant towards his band auditions, disregarding his bandmates. Superbook whisks him, Joy, and Gizmo to the 1st-century Bethany, where they meet Simon Peter, a disciple of Jesus. Accompanying the disciple, the trio meets John, another disciple who argues about the place of honor with other disciples, including Judas Iscariot. Rejoining his disciples, Jesus rebukes them about greatness. When Jesus triumphantly enters Jerusalem while riding a donkey, the crowds praise and welcome him with palm branches. Jesus cleanses the Temple as he drives out the sellers and moneychangers, continuing to teach. At the house, a woman anointing Jesus' feet with expensive perfume troubles Judas Iscariot, but Jesus rebukes him. Struggling with Jesus' recent actions, Judas Iscariot betrays Jesus to the leading priest with thirty pieces of silver. Jesus washes his disciples' feet, teaching Simon Peter and the disciples about humility. During the night at the supper in the upper room, Jesus predicts the betrayal to his disciples, secretly permitting Judas Iscariot to go. As Judas Iscariot leaves the room, Jesus institutes the Communion and prays for his disciples. Returning home, Chris humbles himself and serves his bandmates. Cast: Noel Johansen as Jesus, Brian Drummond as Simon Peter, Trevor Devall as Judas Iscariot and the Vendor, and John Payne as John.
11	11	"He Is Risen!" "The Resurrection of Jesus"	Bryant Paul Richardson	Tim Hodge and Len Uhley	March 31, 2013
In 30 AD, in the Garden of Gethsemane, Jesus prays to the Father about his impending suffering, and Michael the Archangel comforts him. When Satan enters him, Judas Iscariot arrives, alongside Temple priests, and betrays Jesus with a kiss. Simon Peter tries to defend Jesus with a sword, but Jesus intervenes. The temple guards arrest Jesus, and John comforts Mary. In the present, Chris gets into an argument with his mother, Phoebe, after he selfishly skips dinner with a visiting relative. Superbook whisks them, Joy, and Gizmo to Jerusalem, where they meet John and Mary, who await Jesus' trial before Pontius Pilate. Following the trial, Pontius Pilate orders whipping Jesus. The Roman soldiers mock the Messiah as they put a purple robe and crown of thorns on him. Judging the crowds' response, Pontius Pilate reluctantly condemns Jesus to death. Arriving at Golgotha and after carrying the cross on the road, Jesus is crucified on the cross. Entrusting John to Mary and drinking sour wine, Jesus dies, and the Roman centurion professes belief while experiencing earthquakes and darkness. After three days, Mary Magdalene brings the good news of the resurrected Jesus appearing to her at Jesus' tomb, and Simon Peter and John confirm it. Returning home, Chris respects Phoebe's wishes. Cast: Noel Johansen as Jesus and the Temple Priest, Teryl Rothery as Mary, John Payne as John and the Roman Soldier #2, Nicole Oliver as Mary Magdalene, Brian Drummond as Simon Peter, Michael Donovan as the Angel, Trevor Devall as Pontius Pilate, and Paul Dobson as Satan and the Roman Soldier #1.
12	12	"The Road to Damascus" "The Conversion of Saul"	Bryant Paul Richardson	Tim Hodge	January 27, 2013
Chris doesn't see a chance of the kid Jason changing his ways when the latter robs the former's house. Superbook whisks him, Joy, and Gizmo to ancient Jerusalem, where they meet Ananias, who hides from Saul of Tarsus, a persecutor of the followers of Jesus. After telling the trio about the martyrdom of Stephen, who is an evangelist and a devout follower of Jesus, Ananias recounts how Saul approves of stoning Stephen, prompting Saul to arrest anyone who believes in Jesus. Escaping from Saul, Joy and Gizmo flee while Ananias and Chris go to Damascus. The High Priest permits Saul to apprehend the followers of Jesus in Damascus. On the road to Damascus, Jesus appears to Saul through light from heaven, sending him as his minister to Jews and Gentiles, blinding Saul. Witnessing Saul's conversion, Joy and Gizmo tell it to Chris. Jesus calls Ananias to heal Saul's blindness, and at Straight Street, Ananias heals and baptizes Saul. When Saul preaches his conversion by Jesus, the Temple guards search for him, and Saul escapes with a basket. Returning home, Chris gives Jason a second chance. Cast: Noel Johansen as Jesus; Brian Dobson as Saul; Garry Chalk as Ananias, the Temple Guard, and the High Priest; and Sam Vincent as Stephen.
13	13	"Revelation: The Final Battle!" "Revelation!"	Bryant Paul Richardson	Sean Gaffney	April 5, 2013
In the future, Satan rallies his troops for the final battle with Jesus. In the present, Chris believes his parents will never forgive him after accidentally causing his house to burn down. Superbook whisks him to Armageddon, where he meets Satan, disguised as the Angel Lucifer, who attempts to lure Chris to his side. Meanwhile, Superbook whisks Joy and Gizmo to the throne room of heaven, where they meet an elderly John, who witnesses the end of days, writing down visions of the future. John explains the Spirit of God, who brings him to Heaven, remembering the ascension of Jesus while promising the Holy Spirit. Superbook takes Joy and Gizmo to the desert where Chris is, who realizes Lucifer is the Devil, who fails to tempt him to eat the forbidden fruit. Filled with the Holy Spirit, Chris confronts Satan, who becomes the Snake, and then flees with Joy and Gizmo. Jesus, with his armies of heaven, suddenly returns and vanquishes Satan. With evil destroyed forever, God restores all creation with a new heaven, a new earth, and a New Jerusalem. Recording everything, John, alongside the trio, bows before God. Returning home, Chris faces his parents, who forgive him. Cast: Noel Johansen as Jesus, Paul Dobson as Lucifer / Satan / Snake, and John Payne as John.

=== Season 2 (2013–14) ===
No. overall	No. in series	Title	Directed by	Written by	Original release date
14	1	"Jonah" "Jonah Hears God"	Bryant Paul Richardson	Cory Edwards	June 29, 2013
In ancient Israel, Prophet Jonah runs away from God, who commissions him to warn Nineveh, a city of God's enemies. In the present, Joy refuses to show mercy to Sharon Myers, the Valleyview Middle School thief bully, demanding justice from Principal Travis. Superbook whisks her, Chris, and Gizmo to a boat amidst the great storm on the Mediterranean Sea, sailing for Tarshish, where they meet the runaway Jonah. Following the casting of lots, the ship's captain and the crewmen identify Jonah as the cause of the storm and throw him and the trio overboard. As the storm ceases, a great fish swallows them, and they stay inside it for three days. Jonah prays, causing the fish to spit him and the trio onto a beach. Arriving at Nineveh, Jonah warns its people about God's judgment as he witnesses their wickedness. Learning the repentance of Nineveh through the King's decree to pray and fast by wearing sackcloth and sitting in ashes, Jonah is upset with God, who has forgiven Nineveh. After explaining his mercy to Nineveh, God comforts Jonah with the lesson of a plant. Upon returning, Joy shows mercy to Sharon. Cast: Bill Mondy as Jonah and a Ninevite, Jim Conrad as God, Dale Wilson as the Ship's Captain and the King of Nineveh, Michael Kopsa as Crewman #1 and a Ninevite Man, Sam Vincent as Crewman #2, Colin Murdock as Crewman #3 and a Ninevite, Cathy Weseluck as a Ninevite Woman, and Sam Vincent as a Ninevite.
15	2	"Joseph and Pharaoh's Dream" "Joseph Shares His Dreams"	Bryant Paul Richardson	Sean Gaffney	August 29, 2013
In ancient Canaan, seeing Jacob give the coat of many colors to his son, Joseph, favorably, Joseph's brothers, including Reuben and Judah, jealously throw Joseph into a pit. In the present, Chris' plan for the soccer match is interrupted when Professor Crispin helps someone with a stranded car. Superbook whisks Chris, Joy, and Gizmo to a prison in ancient Egypt, where they meet Joseph, the prisoner in charge, who recounts his old dreams of greatness, leading to his envious brothers selling him to slavery. The Pharaoh's cup-bearer, whose dreams Joseph has interpreted, seeks Joseph's help to explain the Pharaoh's dreams. Pharaoh tells his dreams to Joseph, who interprets them as seven years of abundance and seven years of famine. Discerning Joseph's wisdom, the Pharaoh makes him the Governor of Egypt. During the famine, when Joseph's brothers arrive in Egypt to buy grain, Joseph confronts them, who bow before him, and demands to bring Benjamin. With the famine worsening and Simeon in prison, Jacob reluctantly agrees to let Benjamin go. Perceiving his brothers, Joseph tests them with his special cup, revealing himself and reconciling with them. Jacob reunites with Joseph, moving into Egypt. Upon returning, Chris trusts God's plans. Cast: Kirby Morrow as Joseph; Andrew Kavadas as Jacob, Reuben, and the Steward; John Payne as Judah; James Kirk as Benjamin; and John Novak as Pharaoh.
16	3	"The Fiery Furnace!" "Shadrach, Meshach, and Abednego"	Bryant Paul Richardson	Brian Cochran	August 27, 2013
Chris struggles with the moral dilemma of looking at an answer guide for an upcoming test which he hasn't studied for. Superbook whisks him, Joy, and Gizmo to ancient Babylon in 500 BC, where they meet three friends, Shadrach, Meshach, and Abednego, discussing the Golden Image that King Nebuchadnezzar sets up. After the astrologers threaten the three friends, the celebratory ceremony for the Golden Image begins, and by King Nebuchadnezzar's command, everyone bows down to worship it, except for Shadrach, Meshach, and Abednego. When they defy King Nebuchadnezzar, the King arrests them to give them another chance to worship the Golden Image or face being cast into the fiery furnace. Standing up for their faith in God, Shadrach, Meshach, and Abednego refuse to worship it. Furious, King Nebuchadnezzar orders them to be thrown into the fiery furnace. Looking at the fiery furnace, King Nebuchadnezzar sees Shadrach, Meshach, and Abednego, with the fourth person he describes as God, walking out of the fire unharmed. King Nebuchadnezzar commands the three friends to come out, praising God and decreeing against anyone who speaks against their God, taking down the Golden Image. Upon returning, Chris decides against using the answer guide in taking the test and barely passes it. However, the teacher gives him extra credit for his honesty, earning him a trip to the amusement park. Cast: Brian Drummond as Shadrach and a Babylonian Official; John Payne as Meshach, a Babylonian Official and a Soldier; Michael Donovan as Abednego and a Babylonian Official; Garry Chalk as King Nebuchadnezzar; Colin Murdock as a Babylonian Official; and Sam Vincent as a Soldier.
17	4	"Rahab and the Walls of Jericho" "Rahab and Jericho"	Bryant Paul Richardson	Len Uhley	July 18, 2013
At the east side of the Jordan River, God calls Joshua to succeed Moses to lead the Israelites into the Promised Land. In the present, Joy struggles with her unfriendly partner, Becky, for a science project. Superbook whisks her, Chris, and Gizmo to the Israelite encampment, where they meet Joshua, who discusses sending two spies to Jericho. Accompanying the spies into Jericho, the trio meets Rahab, an innkeeper, who lets the spies in. After the guards interrogate Rahab concerning Israelite spies, who she hides on the roof, Rahab deals with the spies to save her family with a scarlet rope as the sign. Superbook takes the trio forward to the west side of the Jordan River, rejoining the Israelites, who carry the Ark of the Covenant, and Joshua, who recounts his meeting with Jesus—the Commander of the Lord's army. With the priests blowing their horns daily, the Israelites march around the walls of Jericho once a day for six days, then seven times on the seventh day, where they shout, causing the city walls to fall. The spies save Rahab and her family while Joshua and his troops conquer Jericho. Upon returning, Joy befriends Becky. Cast: Jim Conrad as God; Noel Johansen as Jesus / Commander of the Lord's Army; Trevor Devall as Joshua, the Captain of the Guard and the Guard; Brian Drummond as the Second-In-Command and the Spy #2; Michael Donovan as the Spy #1; Lisa Ann Beley as Rahab; and John Payne as the King of Jericho.
18	5	"Esther: For Such a Time as This!" "Queen Esther"	Bryant Paul Richardson	Sindy McKay	August 17, 2013
In ancient Persia, 5th century BC, Haman, the minister, plots to kill all the Jews, casting lots with his friends to seal the fate of Mordecai, a Jew in exile, and approaches King Xerxes to decree it. In the present, challenged to stand up to Janice, the President of the Girls' Leadership Club, Joy is discouraged. Superbook whisks her, Chris, and Gizmo to Susa in Persia, where Joy meets Queen Esther, who mentions the previous Queen Vashti, and her servant, Hathach. Queen Esther, alongside Joy, witnesses her cousin, Mordecai, who wears sackcloth and ashes, refusing to bow before Haman. Queen Esther sends Hathach to speak with Mordecai, who encourages the Queen to talk to King Xerxes about Haman's decree, making all Jews fast. In the court, King Xerxes favors Queen Esther, who bravely approaches him, holding out his golden scepter. The Queen invites King Xerxes and Haman to a banquet, where she exposes Haman's plans against Mordecai and the Jews, enraging King Xerxes. Taking away Haman, King Xerxes decrees to help the Jews through Mordecai and Queen Esther. Upon returning, Joy nominates Bonnie Scott, the new girl in the wheelchair, for the club. Cast: Keegan Connor Tracy as Esther, Michael Dobson as Mordecai and the King's Servant, Trevor Devall as Hathach and Xerxes, Andrew Kavadas as Haman, Colin Murdock as Haman's Friend, Sam Vincent as Haman's Friend, and John Payne as the Servant Overseer.
19	6	"John the Baptist"	Bryant Paul Richardson	Len Uhley	January 9, 2014
After baptizing his disciples in the Jordan River, John the Baptist baptizes Jesus. In the present, Chris must choose between playing stolen games or deleting them. Superbook whisks him, Joy, and Gizmo to the wilderness beside the Jordan River, where they meet John, who preaches repentance to the crowds. Confronting a Sadducee, John says someone greater than him is coming. When King Herod Antipas interrupts the sermon, John publicly rebukes his sin of taking his brother's wife, Herodias, who is angered. While the trio searches for locusts and honey, John's disciples ask their teacher regarding Jesus, and John tells them that Jesus is the Messiah. As a favor to Herodias and her daughter, Salome, King Herod Antipas arrests John. Superbook takes the trio forward to Galilee, where they rejoin John's disciples, who, on their teacher's behalf, ask Jesus if he is the Messiah. The trio goes to Machaerus after learning John is imprisoned there, where John prophecies about himself. At Herodias' request, Salome dances for King Herod Antipas, who promises to her, and she asks for John's head. King Herod Antipas regretfully beheads John. Ultimately, Jesus acknowledges and recognizes John the Baptizer. Returning home, a melancholic Chris faces Sam. Cast: Jim Conrad as God, Noel Johansen as Jesus, Paul Dobson as John the Baptist, Michael Donovan as Herod Antipas, Teryl Rothery as Herodias, Kathleen Barr as Salome, Brian Drummond as John the Baptist's Disciple #1 and a Sadducee, Michael Dangerfield as John the Baptist's Disciple #2, and Colin Murdock as the Centurion.
20	7	"Paul and the Shipwreck" "The Shipwreck"	Bryant Paul Richardson	Steve Granat and Cydne Clark	November 11, 2013
In ancient Jerusalem, an angry mob causes a disturbance by falsely accusing Paul, a Christian, of bringing a non-believer into the Temple, leading to Captain Lysias arresting Paul. In the present, Joy must choose between finishing her mission or giving up on a disaster relief effort. Superbook whisks her, Chris, and Gizmo to a ship boarding that heads to Rome, where they meet Paul, now a prisoner, who will stand trial before Caesar, recounting Jesus appearing to strengthen him in his cell, encouraging Joy. While sailing, Paul shares with the ship's officers about a pending disaster after sensing danger, but they dismiss him. When the storm suddenly emerges, Paul, while praying, sees an angel who appears and affirms safety. Paul tells the crew that everyone will be all right, ministering to them by giving bread. Approaching an island, the shipwrecks and Captain Julius instructs everyone to head for shore. Everyone arrives on the island of Malta, where Paul is miraculously unharmed after being bitten by a viper. Witnessing the miracle, the locals ask Paul to heal the father of their leader, Publius. Paul heals him, staying in Malta temporarily for Rome. Upon returning, Joy faces her relief project. Cast: Noel Johansen as Jesus; Michael Donovan as the Angel, Julius, and a Sailor; Brian Dobson as Paul; Colin Murdock as the Centurion and a Roman Soldier; Sam Vincent as Lysias and a Maltese Man; Michael Dobson as the Ship's Captain; and Andrew Kavadas as a Sailor and Publius.
21	8	"Job"	Bryant Paul Richardson	Sean Roche	June 24, 2014
Satan visits Heaven to ask God for permission to torment Job. In the present, during the worst week of his life, including losing his pet iguana and breaking his arm, as well as losing money, Chris loses his grandfather. Superbook whisks him, Joy, and Gizmo to a land where Sabean raiders take Job's cattle. Satan rains down fires on Job's possessions and kills his children. Escaping from catastrophes, the trio witnesses Job and his wife receiving the reports of the calamities. Despite the calamities and horrifying tragedies, Job continues to worship and serve God by sacrificing. Satan visits Heaven a second time to ask God for permission to plague Job's body, striking him with boils that prompt his wife to contend to curse God and die. Visiting Job, his friends, Eliphaz, Bildad, and Zophar, assert that Job's problems are because of his sin, arguing with Job, who asks God what he has done wrong. Speaking with Chris, Job declares that his redeemer lives. When Eliphaz, Bildad, and Zophar leave, God confronts Job. As God shares his grandness with Job, he repents. After God criticizes them for their foolishness, Eliphaz, Bildad, and Zophar return to Job and ask for forgiveness. Then, God restores Job and his household. Returning home, Chris reads a passage at his grandfather's funeral. Cast: Jim Conrad as God; Michael Donovan as Michael and Zophar; Sam Vincent as an Angel and Job's Servant; Paul Dobson as an Angel, Job's Servant, and Satan; Colin Murdock as an Angel and Bildad; Alan Marriott as Job; Cathy Weseluck as Job's Wife; Andrew Kavadas as Job's Servant; Michael Adamthwaite as Job's Servant; and Gary Chalk as Eliphaz.
22	9	"Noah and the Ark" "Noah Hears from God"	Bryant Paul Richardson	Len Uhley	September 9, 2013
Chris must choose between skipping school during school hours or rejecting Pearce's dangerous influence. Superbook whisks him, Joy, and Gizmo to when the world is fraught with evil, where God vows to destroy the world. The trio meets Noah, where God tells Noah to build an ark, covenanting to save Noah and his family from the flood. Alongside the trio, Noah, his sons, Shem, Ham, and Japheth, and their wives build the ark. When everything is ready, including the animals, God tells Noah to enter the ark. When God closes it, the flood begins, raining for 40 days. During the flood, Chris discusses his situation with Noah. Remembering and saving only Noah and his family, God stops the rain, and the waters recede after the flood. Noah releases a raven and a dove to look for land, and the dove returns with an olive leaf. God commands Noah to leave the ark, alongside his family and all animals, proceeding to share with Noah about his rainbow covenant, promising not to destroy the world with a flood again. Upon returning, Chris rejects Pearce's dangerous influence. Cast: Jim Conrad as God, Ron Halder as Noah, Kathleen Barr as Noah's Wife, Michael Adamthwaite as Japheth, Colin Murdock as Marauder #1, and Michael Donovan as Marauder #2.
23	10	"Gideon"	Bryant Paul Richardson	Tim Hodge, Cydne Clark and Steve Granat	October 11, 2014
When Joy's parents get stuck in the middle of a storm due to a tree falling on their car, Joy doubts she'll be able to rescue them. Superbook whisks her, Chris, and Gizmo to Ophrah between 1400 and 1000 BC, where they meet Gideon and his servant, Purah, who are Israelites hiding from the Midianites invading Israel. At the terebinth tree, the trio witnesses Gideon encountering Jesus, the Angel of the Lord, who tells him to rescue Israel from the Midianites and reassures him with his offering. Superbook takes the trio forward in time, where they reunite with Gideon, now the commander of Israel's army. Following God, Gideon tells his soldiers frightened to fight to return to their homes and then cuts the size of his army even more by watching how soldiers drink from a stream. After Gideon shares how God affirms his plans through a sheep's fleece, he, alongside Purah, sneaks into the Midianite army's camp, where he hears a Midianite soldier's dream that strengthens him. Rallying his army of 300, Gideon prepares them to battle the Midianites, defeating them with God's help by blasting ram's horns and smashing pitchers with torches. After defeating the Midianites, Gideon affirms God as the ruler of Israel. Returning home, Joy saves her parents. Cast: Noel Johansen as Jesus / Angel of the Lord and an Israelite Soldier; Michael Dobson as Gideon and an Israelite Soldier; Lee Tockar as Purah, Midianite Soldier #2, and an Israelite Soldier; Jim Conrad as God and an Israelite Soldier; Sam Vincent as Midianite Soldier #1 and an Israelite Soldier; and Colin Murdock as an Israelite Soldier.
24	11	"Peter's Denial"	Bryant Paul Richardson	Len Uhley	April 10, 2014
Cast: Noel Johansen as Jesus and Temple Guard #2; Brian Drummond as Simon Peter; John Payne as John; Brad Swaile as Thomas; Colin Murdock as Temple Guards #1 and #4; Sam Vincent as Temple Guard #3; Shannon Chan-Kent as Servant Girl #1; and Cathy Weseluck as Servant Girl #2
25	12	"The Prodigal Son"	Bryant Paul Richardson	Sean Roche	August 27, 2014
Cast: Noel Johansen as Jesus; Cole Howard as Micah; Brian Drummond as Simon Peter; John Payne as John; Ian Hanlin as Prodigal Son; Michael Donovan as Prodigal Son's Father and Scribe; Trevor Devall as Older Brother and Pharisee #2; Sam Vincent as Servant; Michael Adamthwaite as Pharisee #1
26	13	"Elijah and the Prophets of Baal" "Elijah"	Tony Bancroft and Bryant Paul Richardson	David Baldwin	September 19, 2014
Cast: Michael Dobson as Elijah and Prophet of Baal #2; Brian Doe as Tobiah; Trevor Devall as King Ahab, Muluch, Hason and Prophet of Baal #4; Teryl Rothery as Jezebel; Colin Murdock as Amnon; Cathy Weseluck as Nahara; Sam Vincent as Prophet of Baal #1; Andrew Kavadas as Prophet of Baal #3

=== Season 3 (2015–17) ===
No. overall	No. in series	Title	Directed by	Written by	Original release date
27	1	"Ruth"	Tony Bancroft and Bryant Paul Richardson	Erin Zimmerman	January 13, 2015
Cast:
28	2	"Tower of Babel and The Day of Pentecost" "The Tower of Babel"	Bryant Paul Richardson	Sean Roche	August 20, 2015
Cast: Noel Johansen as Jesus; Brian Dobson as Archangel Michael, Tower Leader and Judean Man; Colin Murdock as Angel and Judas, son of James; Michael Donovan as Man in White #1; Sam Vincent as Man in White #2 and Naysayer #1; Brian Drummond as Architect, Simon Peter and Jewish Man #1; Brad Swaile as Aide and Thomas; Teryl Rothery as Mary; John Payne as John and Jewish Man #2; Shannon Chan-Kent as Servant; Jan Rabson as Egyptian and Naysayer #2; and Cathy Weseluck as Elamite Woman.
29	3	"The Birth of John the Baptist"	Craig Grasso and Bryant Paul Richardson	Sean Roche	November 6, 2014
Cast: Mark Oliver as Zechariah and Priest #3; Ellen Kennedy as Elizabeth; Teryl Rothery as Mary; Michael Dobson as Archangel Gabriel; Richard Newman as Priest #1; Trevor Devall as Priest #2; and Cathy Weseluck as Children's Laughter.
30	4	"Isaac and Rebekah" "Rebekah and Isaac"	Robert Kirbyson and Bryant Paul Richardson	David Ehrman and Nate Ehrman	August 3, 2015
Cast:
31	5	"Naaman and the Servant Girl"	Bryant Paul Richardson	Sean Roche	December 11, 2014
Cast: Paul Dobson as Naaman and King Joram's Aide; Erin Matthews as Servant Girl; Cathy Weseluck as Naaman's Wife; Brian Drummond as Elisha and Syrian Raider #2; Garry Chalk as Elisha's Servant and King Joram; Sam Vincent as Ben-Hadad II; Ian Hanlon as Naaman's Aide; and Colin Murdock as Syrian Raider #1.
32	6	"Samuel and the Call of God" "Samuel"	Jerry Yu Ching	Sean Gaffney	December 11, 2015
Cast:
33	7	"David and Saul" "Saul and David"	Bryant Paul Richardson	Len Uhley	February 4, 2016
Cast:
34	8	"Nehemiah"	Bryant Paul Richardson and Robert Kirbyson	Nate Ehram and David Ehrman	May 26, 2016
Cast:
35	9	"Elisha and the Syrians"	Jerry Yu Ching	Mark Edward Edens	September 26, 2016
Cast:
36	10	"Lazarus"	Jerry Yu Ching and Bryant Paul Richardson	Nate Ehram	March 17, 2017
Cast:
37	11	"King Solomon"	Jerry Yu Ching and Bryant Paul Richardson	David Baldwin	November 28, 2016
Cast:
38	12	"Nebuchadnezzar's Dream" "Daniel and King Nebuchadnezzar's Dream"	Jerry Yu Ching and Bryant Paul Richardson	Mark Edward Edens	February 27, 2017
Cast:
39	13	"The Good Samaritan"	Bryant Paul Richardson	Mark Edward Edens	February 13, 2015
Cast:

=== Season 4 (2017–19) ===
No. overall	No. in series	Title	Directed by	Written by	Original release date
40	1	"Jesus Feeds the Hungry" "Miracles of Jesus 2/Miracles II"	Bryant Paul Richardson and Jerry Yu Ching	Sean Gaffney and Sean Roche	November 18, 2018
Cast:
41	2	"Peter and Cornelius" "Salvation for All!"	Bryant Paul Richardson and Jerry Yu Ching	Cheryl McKay	June 24, 2017
Cast:
42	3	"Paul and Silas"	Bryant Paul Richardson and Jerry Yu Ching	Erin Zimmerman	August 21, 2017
Cast:
43	4	"Teach Us to Pray" "How Do You Pray"	Bryant Paul Richardson and Jerry Yu Ching	David Baldwin	April 14, 2018
Cast:
44	5	"Peter's Escape"	Bryant Paul Richardson and Jerry Yu Ching	Len Uhley	October 14, 2017
Cast:
45	6	"Jesus Heals the Blind" "Miracles of Jesus 3/Miracles III"	Bryant Paul Richardson and Jerry Yu Ching	Cheryl McKay	November 17, 2017
Cast:
46	7	"Joshua and Caleb" "Caleb and Joshua"	Bryant Paul Richardson and Jerry Yu Ching	David Baldwin	April 27, 2018
Cast:
47	8	"Elijah and the Widow"	Bryant Paul Richardson and Jerry Yu Ching	Erin Zimmerman	May 25, 2018
Cast:
48	9	"Solomon's Temple" "Building the Temple"	Bryant Paul Richardson and Jerry Yu Ching	David Baldwin	April 9, 2019
Cast:
49	10	"Paul and Barnabas"	Bryant Paul Richardson and Jerry Yu Ching	Sean Roche	March 27, 2019
Cast:
50	11	"Jesus in the Wilderness" "The Temptations in the Wilderness"	Bryant Paul Richardson and Jerry Yu Ching	Len Uhley	February 6, 2019
Cast:
51	12	"Jeremiah"	Bryant Paul Richardson and Jerry Yu Ching	Mark Edens	October 25, 2018
Cast:
52	13	"Philip"	Bryant Paul Richardson and Jerry Yu Ching	Mark Edens	June 25, 2019
Cast:

=== Season 5 (2019–21) ===
No. overall	No. in series	Title	Directed by	Written by	Original release date
53	1	"The Birth of Moses"	Bryant Paul Richardson	David Evan Cunningham (screenplay); Sean Roche	September 24, 2019
Cast:
54	2	"Nicodemus"	Bryant Paul Richardson	Sean Roche	December 17, 2019
Cast:
55	3	"Zacchaeus" "Baptism"	Bryant Paul Richardson	Cheryl McKay (screenplay); Sean Roche	January 21, 2020
Cast:
56	4	"Isaiah" "Isaiah & Hezekiah"	Bryant Paul Richardson	Mark Edens (screenplay); Sean Roche	February 3, 2020
Cast:
57	5	"The Sermon on the Mount"	Bryant P. Richardson	Cheryl McKay (screenplay); Sean Roche	March 11, 2020
Cast:
58	6	"Baptized!" "Calling of the Twelve Disciples"	Bryant P. Richardson	Cheryl McKay (screenplay); Sean Roche	April 17, 2020
Cast:
59	7	"Jesus — Friend of Sinners" "The Parable of the Great Supper, The Call of Matthew and The Sinful Woman"	Bryant P. Richardson	David Balchwin & Sean Roche	June 12, 2020
Cast:
60	8	"Paul Keeps the Faith"	Bryant P. Richardson	David Evan Cunningham (screenplay); Sean Roche	September 15, 2020
Cast:
61	9	"Love Your Enemies" "Garden of Gethsemane and Stoning of Stephen"	Bryant Paul Richardson	Mark Edward Edens (screenplay)	January 28, 2021
Cast:
62	10	"Paul and the Unknown God, Part 1" "Defending Your Faith ━ Pt. 1"	Bryant P. Richardson	Bryant P. Richardson (screenplay)	November 20, 2020
Cast:
63	11	"Paul and the Unknown God, Part 2" "Defending Your Faith ━ Pt. 2"	Bryant P. Richardson	Bryant P. Richardson (screenplay)	November 20, 2020
Cast:
64	12	"Doubting Thomas"	Bryant P. Richardson	Mark Edward Edens (screenplay)	February 18, 2021
Cast:
65	13	"The Promise of a Child"	Bryant Paul Richardson	Sean Roche	November 12, 2019
Cast:
66	14	"Rescued!"	Bryant Paul Richardson	Sean Roche	July 20, 2020
Cast:
67	15	"Heroes of the Bible"	Bryant P. Richardson	Sean Roche	March 20, 2021
Cast:
68	16	"The Widow's Mite" "Tithing"	Bryant P. Richardson	Sean Roche	April 4, 2021
Cast:

== Shorts ==
=== Gizmo Go! (2020–22) ===
In 2020, Superbook began releasing DVDs about Miss Tina starting her internship at Quantum Labs and meeting four comical robots: Gizmo, Rig, Gears and Widget.

Title	Original release date
"Tina's First Day: A Lesson in Courage"	2020
"The Quantum Hotel: A Lesson in Obedience"	2021
"Call the Repair Bots! A Lesson in Honesty"	2021
"Case of the Missing Protonatron: A Lesson in Friendship"	2021
"The Wind-Up Robot: A Lesson in Accepting Differences"	2022
"The Fast and the Gear-ious: A Lesson in Patience"	2022
"Invasion of the Bug-O-Mytes: A Lesson in Working Together"	2022
"Quantum Karaoke: A Sing-Along Special"	2022
"Quantum Christmas"	2023
"A Tale of Two Widgets: a Lesson in Self-Control"	August 15, 2023
"Rig of the West: a Lesson in Generosity"	2024
"Return of the Flying House: a Lesson in Humility"	TBA
"Kindness Is No Joke: A Lesson in Kindness"	TBA

=== Superbook Specials (2022) ===
Title	Original release date
"Gizmo's Christmas Party Dilemma"	2022
"Gizmo's Roadmap to Easter"	2022
"The Adventures of Captain Kindness"	2022

== DVD releases ==
From 2016 to 2021, Superbook began releasing DVDs which contained two previously released episodes per DVD. There are also special features on each DVD, such as how to draw a character in the Superbook artwork style, music videos, and/or informational videos explaining where the events of the stories may have taken place or how they relate to Jesus Christ.

Volume	Title	Original release date
1	"Explorer Volume 1"	2016
2	"Explorer Volume 2"	2016
3	"Explorer Volume 3"	2016
4	"Explorer Volume 4"	2016
5	"Explorer Volume 5"	2016
6	"Explorer Volume 6"	2016
7	"Explorer Volume 7"	2016
8	"Explorer Volume 8"	2017
9	"Explorer Volume 9"	2017
10	"Explorer Volume 10"	2017
11	"Explorer Volume 11"	2017
12	"Explorer Volume 12"	2018
13	"Explorer Volume 13"	2018
14	"Explorer Volume 14"	2018
15	"Explorer Volume 15"	2018
16	"Explorer Volume 16"	2018
17	"Explorer Volume 17"	2018
18	"Explorer Volume 18"	2018
19	"Explorer Volume 19"	2019
20	"Explorer Volume 20"	2019
21	"Explorer Volume 21"	2019
22	"Explorer Volume 22"	2019
23	"Explorer Volume 23"	2019
24	"Explorer Volume 24"	2019
25	"Explorer Volume 25"	2020
26	"Explorer Volume 26"	2020
27	"Explorer Volume 27"	2021
28	"Explorer Volume 28"	2021
29	"Explorer Volume 29"	2021
30	"Explorer Volume 30"	2021
31	"Explorer Volume 31"	2021
