= Slugterra: Return of the Elementals =

- Film poster
- Directed by: Johnny Darrell; Logan McPherson; Behzad Mansoori-Dara; Daniel DeSerranno; Steve Sacks
- Written by: Guy Toubes; Jonathan Callan; Ken Pontac; Asaph Fipke
- Produced by: Asaph Fipke; Chuck Johnson; Ken Faier
- Starring: Sam Vincent; Andrew Francis; Lee Tockar; Shannon Chan-Kent; Vincent Tong; Mark Oliver; Brian Dobson; Brian Drummond
- Music by: Brian Carson
- Production company: Nerd Corps Entertainment
- Distributed by: Shout! Factory
- Release date: August 21, 2014
- Running time: 63 minutes
- Country: Canada
- Languages: English; French

Slugterra: Return of the Elementals is a 2014 Canadian animated film produced by the Canadian company Nerd Corps Entertainment. It is the second film of the 2012 animated series Slugterra. It premiered on August 2, 2014, in US and August 21, 2014.

== Plot ==
Following the events of the previous film, Junjie has settled in as a member of the Shane Gang and introduces to them concept of Slug-Fu. Where in by forging a deep connection to his Slugs Junjie can control them from a distance, as he demonstrates with his Infurnus Joo-Joo. Things soon take a turn for the bizarre when all of the group's Air and Toxic Slugs suddenly turn into incurable Ghouls.

Further investigation reveals that every Air and Toxic slug in Slugterra has been turned as well. While on their way to help deal with the chaos the group are ambushed by the Shadow Clan and brought to their base of operations. There Eli is slugged by an Enigmo Slug containing a holographic message from Will Shane.

The Hologram explains that in the event that Will is no longer with him, and if Slugterra was ever truly in danger, then the Shadow Clan have instructions to find Eli and hit him with that slug, which details the legend of the Elementals. According to legend, all Slugs evolved from five Slugs that regulate and control the life blood of Slugterra, each representing one of the five Elements: Earth, Fire, Water, Wind and Energy.

If, in the event that one of the Elementals were to be affected by something, say for example, becoming a Ghoul, then all of their descendants will also be affected, even those who have since evolved into unique sub elements like the Toxic Slugs. If in the event that such a thing were happen then Eli must find all five slugs, de-ghouled, and shoot them all at once which will effectively cure every slug in Slugterra.

With the Wind Slug having obviously already been Ghouled, the group decides to go after the Water Slug next, which is at Undertow Cavern. There the group discover that in addition to the fact that the high number of Ghouled slugs have effected the environment, such as regular water being turned into Dark Water. But that they have been beaten to the water slug by a newly formed alliance of the Darkbane, the Goon with a new dark slinger and a heavily mutated Dr. Blakk, who was mutated when he fell into the Deep Caverns from Eli's previous fight with him.

With the Water Elemental ghouled as well, the Shane Gang decide to go after the Earth Elemental next. The Shane Gang's lack of trust in Junjie nearly costs them their lives when they almost drown in mud, saved only because of the Earth Elemental. Meanwhile, the Alliance has gone to Quiet Lawn Cavern to collect the Energy Elemental, only to learn that it's not there and confront Red Hook. After the Alliance leaves, the Shane Gang arrive and soon hit the same roadblock as the alliance have, not even with Kord's Elemental Slug Tracker. However, when they arrive there, they see Red Hook who was wounded when Blakk crushed him with a rock and the Shane gang helps him but all looks hopeless at first until Doc arrives and heal him. Eli puts two and two together realizes that having found Doc inside Quiet Lawn realizes that Doc is the Energy Elemental!

With the tally two slugs each the group decides to go and get the final Slug, the Fire Elemental. With the only entrance into the cavern being a large hole leading Junjie and Eli are forced to go alone as they are the only ones who can ride their Infurnuses to the top. Unfortunately in the middle of the flight, the Fire Elemental got ghouled turning the two Infurnusi into Ghouls as well. Kord gets the idea to scrap their Mecha-Beasts for parts to build jet packs to fly to the top and provide much needed back up. The fight spills out into the heavily ghouled mushroom forest where the Goon is separated from his slinger, who is revealed to be none other than Eli's own long lost father: Will Shane.

Further more now that the Earth Elemental is ghouled as well, leaving the group only their Energy Slugs to fight with and Doc is their only hope to cure the Elementals. Dr. Blakk and the Goon make the decision to put their differences aside to defeat the Shane Gang. In the resulting cross fire, a shot from the Wind Elemental opens a terra-portal into the Deep Caverns that Will knocks himself, Blakk, and the Goon into. As much as it pains him to do so the others convince Eli to fire off the slugs with the others, saving Slugterra but in exchange, sealing the portal. Eli promises himself that the group will rescue his father and nothing is going to stand in their way.

== Cast ==
- Sam Vincent as Eli Shane, Will Shane
- Andrew Francis as Kord, Shadow Clan Leader
- Lee Tockar as Pronto
- Shannon Chan-Kent as Trixie
- Vincent Tong as Junjie
- Brian Drummond as Redhook, TV Announcer
- Brian Dobson as Goon
- Mark Oliver as Dr. Blakk

== Release ==
=== Theater ===
This film was released on August 2, 2014, in USA Theaters by Screenvision. The film was also released in Canada on August 21, 2014, in Theaters by Cineplex with a limited Fire Elemental Slug toy and a poster.

=== DVD ===
The film is available on Amazon in the United States and in Canada with a bonus Slug toy. In the US and Canada, the DVD features a bonus episode, "Noodle Strikes Back."

=== Television ===
The film aired on television on September 13, 2014, on Disney XD Canada.
