= Action Dad =

- Genre: Adventure; Animation; Comedy; Science Fantasy; Action
- Created by: Andrew Dickman (concept)
- Starring: Chelan Simmons; Lee Tockar; Ashleigh Ball; Michael Donovan; Sarah John
- Countries of origin: United States; Canada; Australia
- Original language: English
- No. of seasons: 1
- No. of episodes: 22

Production
- Producers: Christine Danzo; Konnie Kwak; Ira Warren
- Running time: Approx. 18-20 mins
- Production companies: Toonzone Studios; CCI Entertainment; SLR Productions Ltd

Original release
- Network: Cartoon Network Brazil
- Release: September 12 – October 16, 2012

Action Dad is a 2012 animated series based on an original concept by Andrew Dickman. It was produced by Animation Development Company and Toonzone Studios. The show features the voices of Chelan Simmons, Lee Tockar and Michael Donovan. The show premiered in Brazil on September 12, 2012, on Cartoon Network Brazil. The show has also aired in Portugal, Israel and France. Although previously thought to premiere in mid-2011, the show has yet to be distributed in the United States as of 2026.

== Plot ==
The story revolves around Liz Ramsey (Chelan Simmons) and her little brother Mick Ramsey (Ashleigh Ball in the series, Joel McFarlene in the pilot), two normal teenagers with one exception; their father Chuck Ramsey (Michael Donovan in the series, Maurice LaMarche in the original pitched pilot) is a secret spy and their mother Angela Ramsey (Sarah Johns) is a super-villain. Although the two parents work for both good and evil, they have the same intention of keeping their children out of harm from their missions and enemies.

== Cast ==
- Chelan Simmons as Liz Ramsey
- Ashleigh Ball as Mick Ramsey
- Michael Donovan as Chuck Ramsey
- Sarah Johns as Angela Ramsey
- Lee Tockar as Various
- Ian James Corlett as Baron Von Dash
- Peter Kelamis as Shortcut, Prince Eyeball, H.Q. Voice, Alam Voice, Director, Computor
- Trevor Devall as Nun Chuck
- Paul Dobson as Glass Jaw
- Cole Howard as Jack Poundpenny

== Characters ==
=== Ramsey Family ===
- Chuck Ramsey: Agent Ramsey is the best Agent of the headquarters S.H.H.H.H.H (Super hollow fact heroic fighter Humatizados), manages to overcome some missions and most of them is to combat Von dash, is married to Angela although they fight one-on-one.
- Angela Ramsey: Angela or agent mother is a beautiful agent of the improvement of A.R.G.H (Association of Repressive Gangsters skilled) headquarters, she worked alongside Baron Von Dash although sometimes betrays it to protect her family.
- Liz Ramsey: Liz Ramsey is the eldest daughter of Chuck and Angela, Liz is good in combat techniques, when you want to do things for older people learn to drive, get a boyfriend or be in an appointment, Chuck hardly leaves Her to do those things.
- Mick Ramsey: Mick Ramsey is the youngest son of Chuck and Angela, Mick is very smart, knows a lot about robotics and sometimes assists parents in their dangerous missions from the home, is not very good physically, but is good with his mind.

=== S.H.H.H.H.H ===
- Major Break: Major Break is the Commander of the barracks of S.H.H.H.H.H, gives orders to all agents, considered Chuck Ramsey as his right hand and leads to Slam McJackson and PoundPenny to fight against A.R.G.H.
- Slam McJackson: Slam McJackson is the one That handles the controls of S.H.H.H.H.H being very adventurous and sometimes helps Chuck in their missions from the barracks when it comes to the danger.
- Ms. PoundPenny: Ms. PoundPenny is one of the agents of S.H.H.H.H.H and the only female agent of the barracks. She helps with the coordinates of the headquarters and has a son named Jack who is the love of Liz Ramsey.

=== A.R.G.H ===
- Baron Von Dash: Von Dash is an agent of A.R.G.H that helps agent mother Against S.H.H.H.H.H but most of the time fails due to agent Ramsey or dur to his own Incompetence He is very clumsy.

== Episodes ==
1. "Agent of MEH" – 17 September 2012
2. "Double Agent Double Date" – 18 September 2012
3. "Getting Schooled" – 19 September 2012
4. "Family Von Dash" – 20 September 2012
5. "Made of Dishonor" – 21 September 2012
6. "World of Workcraft" – 24 September 2012
7. "Old Agent" – 25 September 2012
8. "Action Ramp" – 26 September 2012
9. "2 Buff Chuck" – 27 September 2012
10. "Chuck Goes to Hollywood" – 28 September 2012
11. "Chuck in The Middle" – 1 October 2012
12. "Agent Gone Child" – 2 October 2012
13. "It's A Mall World" – 3 October 2012
14. "Shrinky Fink" – 4 October 2012
15. "Girl Powerless" – 5 October 2012
16. "Thugz Bunny" – 8 October 2012
17. "Time Drivel" – 9 October 2012
18. "Mad Magazine" – 10 October 2012
19. "Xendra Freelance Agent" – 11 October 2012
20. "Giant Crop of Horror" – 12 October 2012
21. "Stop & Shoot the Rose" – 15 October 2012
22. "Curl Scout" – 16 October 2012

== Production ==
Dickman came up with the concept for the show as early as 2006, wanting to make a family orientated show. On the matter he said "I used to LOVE old action hero movies (which were also comedies sometimes) that starred either Hulk Hogan, Arnold Schwartzenegger and etc... I miss those old movies, I wanted to see if I could bring that back, a little with this cartoon" He originally pitched the concept to Frederator Studios for their Random! Cartoons anthology when his short for the series, Ivan the Unbearable, was still in production until Toonzone Studios picked up the series. Dickman's only involvement in the project was for the conceptualization of the project's main characters and ideas, as well as boarding an 10-minute pitch pilot which only one minute of it was animated to be used as a pitch for potential investors.

Dickman was not acknowledged of the show going forward until 2009 when he contacted the studio about the show's status and was informed the series was already in production without his involvement. Seth Kearsley was initially brought on board as a showrunner and to revamp the entire concept, although Kearsley was only on the series to direct and edit the pilot episode due to funding issues. Dickman has also stated that commitments to storyboarding on Dinosaur Train prevented him from being involved in the series as well, and believed that him not being contacted was so the studio could "make all the changes they wanted." Some of the changes include the characters' getting new designs and the series' main antagonist, Baron Gash, being renamed to Baron von Dash.

Dickman stated that he was dismissive on the show's final product after seeing it in 2011, and revealed that he wasn't contractually paid for when the show aired on television because his agreement with the studio only covered airings on American cable networks and not international airings.
