= Dreamkix =

2010 South Korean television series

- Promotional poster
- Also known as: Roy's Dream Team
- Genre: Family; CGI cartoon
- Written by: Grant Moran; Ben Townsend-; Chris Brown; Andrew Nicholls and Darrell Vickers; Andrew Guerdat; Stevie Sullivan
- Directed by: Dale Kang
- Voices of: Cathy Weseluck; Brad Swaile; Tabitha St. Germain; Kelly Metzger; Peter Kelamis; Peter New; Sam Vincent; Brian Drummond; Trevor Devall
- Theme music composer: Shin Kim
- Opening theme: Unknown title
- Ending theme: Myungsun Jang
- Composer: Youngjin Mok
- Country of origin: South Korea
- Original languages: English; Korean
- No. of seasons: 1
- No. of episodes: 26 (11 aired)

Production
- Executive producer: Esther Sohn
- Producer: Daeshik Jung
- Running time: 22 minutes
- Production company: Designstorm Animation Studio

Original release
- Network: Seoul Broadcasting System (South Korea); Disney Channel (Southeast Asia)
- Release: June 7 – July 12, 2010

DreamKix is a South Korean CGI animation television series produced by Designstorm Animation Studio. It was intended to promote the 2010 FIFA World Cup in South Africa.

== Storyline ==
DreamKix is the story of a farmyard football team that does its best to join the greatest sporting event of all-the first international football "Dream League" where are the most powerful teams on the planet compete. Roy (one of the main characters) builds a team that is made up athletically challenged characters. However, once these teammates come together they overcome their deficiencies, discover their own unique strengths, and become heroes on the football field and winners in their daily lives.

== Main characters ==
- Roy (No. 10)

Roy is a Dachshund who is a soccer-head who won't give up on his dream of playing football no matter how many people tell him to - because soccer isn't just a game to Roy, it's a passion. With short stubby legs and a body like a sausage, Roy feels he has to prove himself to everyone? His opponents, his teammates, even his dad? Both on and off the field. It is true, he may not be a typical athletic animal, like lions or rhinos, but thanks to the help of his friends Morrie and Emily, Roy learns that his particular physique has its own strengths, especially when it comes to his 'tornado header', a whip-like spinning header that shoots harder than most people is kicks. Roy is a born striker. He is used to charging after the ball, always looking for an opportunity to score. That attitude gets him into sticky situations off the pitch as well as on. It is then that he truly needs the help of his teammates, and each time he learns to appreciate more and more the strength a team gives him. He has a crush on Rebecca. Voiced by Cathy Weseluck.

- Rebecca (n°11)

Rebecca is the fastest dog the Farm lands have ever seen. She is sleek, graceful, 100% classy and the exact opposite of a Sunny Farm F.C. player. Rebecca has incredible internal drive. She is vowed to master every football skill, and gets angry with herself if she can't. That anger only pushes her harder, but she never lets it show. No one on the team knows why the pretty track star joined them, but they are glad she did (especially Roy, for more than one reason.). Voiced by Kelly Metzger.

- Emily (owner)

Emily is a dairy cow who knows nothing about football, except that she owns a team in the biggest football league in the world. She does know that the only way to save her grandfather's farm is by sponsoring a winning team in the Dream League. She needs Roy as much as Roy needs her. She also happens to be the best owner Sunny Farm F.C. could have. Emily is an expert on animal nature. She can find the positive points in any player, see past their defects, discover their strengths, and help them develop their own special skills. Emily thinks fast and outside the box, coming up with quick, unique solutions to any problem. This is what helps her team go up against clubs who have all the money and players they want. It's what helps her challenge them. It's what helps her, and the team, win. Emily may not understand the rules of football, and Roy and Morrie may spend half their time explaining the off-side rule to her, but they both know how valuable she is, and they're proud to wear the Sunny Farm logo on their shirts. Thanks to Roy, Morrie, and the rest of the team, she's learning and she's learning to love it. Voiced by Tabitha St. Germain.

- Morrie (manager, n° 20)

Morrie is a football maniac, Roy's best friend, and team coach for Sunny Farm F.C. Because of a mole's sensitivity to sunlight, while Roy and the other kids were out playing football, Morrie was underground watching every match around the world on the Internet, his face pressed close to the screen. Morrie is a soccer savant. He speaks in statistics, thinks in tactics, and can dream up a strategy to meet any set play. He knows the stats and specs of every player and every team playing - down to their favorite food, and the kind of underwear they wear. He's the ideal coach for Sunny Farm F.C., and often helps save the team from defeat. While Roy is impetuous and often acts without all the information, Morrie always has that information at his paw tips. That's what makes them such great friends. But without Roy, Morrie would just be a sports encyclopedia watching from the sidelines. Roy urges Morrie to action, getting him into the game, both literally and figuratively. Morrie isn't always comfortable being out of his hole, but now he's in the Dream League, his world just got a lot bigger. He may be nervous, but with Roy, Emily, and the rest of the team with him, he's ready to meet the world. Then after winning Dream League he became Manager of First Sunny Farm F.C. Voiced by Brad Swaile.

- DeSanctis Cheep (n°2)

DeSanctis is the main striker for Sunny Farm F.C. He's a chicken with professional experience and amazing football, most of his dribbles and kicks led by pure talent and instinct. DeSanctis was once a very famous soccer player in the past being the main strike(n°9) of teams like JCMN, MPHC. DeSantis played 25 seasons and scored over 450 goals in his career. DeSanctis has chronic short-term memory problems, causing him to completely forget what he's doing every few minutes - forget which way he's playing, forget which team he's playing on even forget he's playing football altogether. It's unknown when DeSanctis developed this memory issue. Voiced by Peter New.

- Byrne (n°9)

Byrne is a cute, cuddly little sheep and the hardest, toughest defender in the Dream League. Raised by wolves, Byrne is a neighborhood 'bad kid'. He was actually picked for the Sunny Farm F.C. team because Roy and the others needed a defender tough enough to withstand the tackles of the players on the other teams. All they have to do now is keep him from collecting yellow cards, stop him from ramming the referee. And never call him 'fluffy'. Voiced by Peter Kelamis.

- Leonardo (n°9)

Leonardo, Savage United's top striker, is the best, brightest, most famous football player in today's game. He's known all over the world by almost everyone, even animals who don't follow football. Kids everywhere copy Leonardo's changing hairstyles, follow his fashions, and wear his lion sweat deodorant. On the field, he has absolute control over the ball. His quiet smoldering anger inspires fear in other players, especially those he considers to be weak, non-athlete animals. Leonardo is Roy's football hero. The Dachshund's room is decorated with his posters and shirts. It's been a long-time wish of Roy's to meet the feline footballer, but he might not like what he finds. Voiced by Bill Mondy.

- Peter (No. 10 for Mega Farms when he plays)

The owner of Megafarm F.C. and Dreamkix's villain. Voiced by Brad Swaile.

== Sunny Farm F.C. team members ==
- Garcia (n°1) = Goalkeeper
- Byrne (n°9) = Defense
- Garrick (n°13) = Defense
- Brian (n°7) = Right side defense-offense
- Alice (n°5) = Left defense-offense
- George (n°6) = Mid-defense
- Henrietta (n°8) = Mid-defense
- Rebecca (n°11) = Mid-Offensive
- Roy (n°10) = Mid-Offensive
- DeSanctis (n°2) = Forward
- Spyro (n°16) = Forward
- Viali (n°77) = Forward
- Jian (Coach, n°3) = Defense
- Morrie (Manager, n°20) = reserve player

== Dream League teams ==
- Sunny Farm F.C.
- Savage United F.C.
- F.C. Alpine
- F.C. Bayou
- Scavengers F.C.
- Rampage F.C.
- Stampede F.C.
- F.C. Stratosphere
- Will Forest F.C.
- Megafarm F.C.
- Real Amazonia F.C.

== Episode list ==
1. Kick Off
2. Wings of a Dog
3. Not So Instant Replay
4. Anger Management
5. The Big Chillax
6. Roy Vs. Roy
7. GOOOOOat!
8. Garcia's Lucky Hots
9. Roy's Pig Mistake
10. Byrne Identity
11. Leonizing Leo
12. ? (Cancelled)

Reference: http://www.wunschliste.de/17041/episoden

== Voice actors ==
- Cathy Weseluck - Roy, Henrietta, Alice
- Brad Swaile - Morrie, Peter, Garrick
- Tabitha St. Germain - Emily
- Kelly Metzger - Rebecca, Millie
- Peter Kelamis - Byrne, Gazelle team captain, Pierre Pierre
- Sam Vincent - Garcia, Young bulldog fan
- Trevor Devall - Sean, Pontelette, Maurice, Rabbit anchor, auditioning rabbit
- Peter New - George, DeSanctis, Jimmy (duck), Gazelle player, Squirrel player 1
- Brian Drummond - Andres, Hudson, Viali
- Bill Mondy as Leonardo
- John Payne as Roy's father
- Brian Dobson as Mr. Krimke

== Awards ==
Awarded 'Excellent Technology Prize' for SICAF Promotion Plan by Seoul Animation Center

Selected as one of the 6 finalist in the 5th Annual Licensing Challenge of the License! Global + MIPCOM Jr.

Selected as the Global Animation Project by KOCCA (Korea Culture & Content Agency)

== Note ==
- Only 11 episodes were released. No other information on the remaining 15 episodes is available.
