= Sam Vincent =

Canadian voice actor

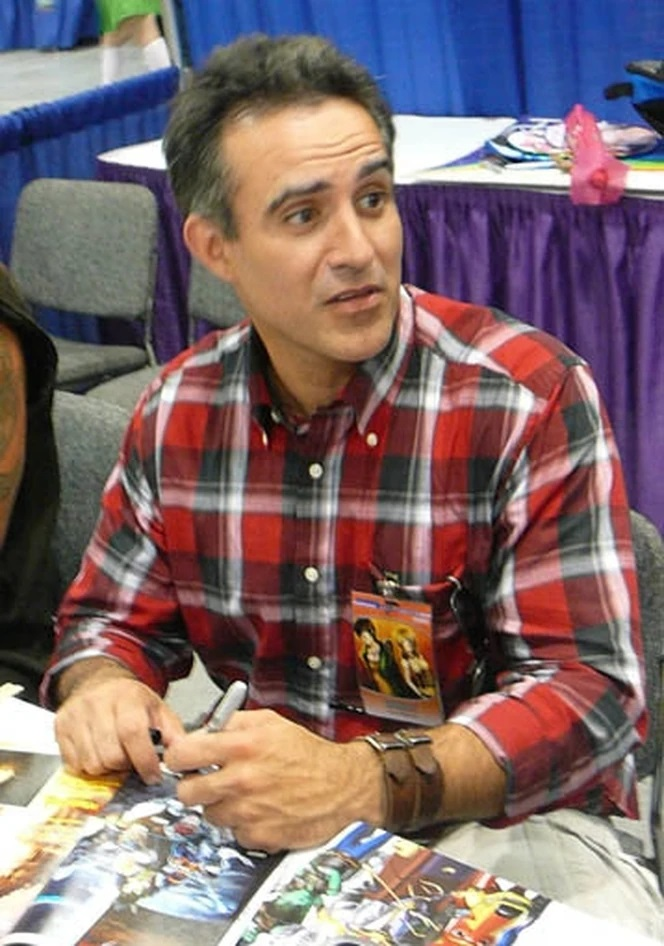
- Vincent in 2023
- Born: Samuel Vincent Khouth
- Occupation: Voice actor
- Years active: 1987–present
- Children: 2
- Relatives: Gabe Khouth (brother)

Samuel Vincent Khouth is a Canadian voice actor who has worked extensively with Ocean Productions and several other dubbing studios based in Vancouver. His voice roles include Edd "Double D" in Ed, Edd n Eddy (1999–2009), Athrun Zala in Mobile Suit Gundam SEED (2004), Jerry Mouse in Tom and Jerry Tales (2006–2008), Tieria Erde in Mobile Suit Gundam 00 (2008–2009), Eli Shane in Slugterra (2012-2016), Russell Ferguson in Littlest Pet Shop (2012–2016), Spiral, President and his sibling Betrayus in Pac-Man and the Ghostly Adventures, and Lloyd Garmadon in Ninjago and Ninjago: Dragons Rising (2018–present).

== Background ==
Samuel Vincent Khouth is the older brother of actor Gabe Khouth (1972—2019). Vincent began acting whilst in high school and professionally, since he was aged 15 years.

Vincent and his wife have two children, including a daughter.

== Career ==
In 2020, Vincent starred in the film Torn: Dark Bullets as Captain Jason Pearce, and in the web series Life of Gabe as his brother, Gabe, who died when he suffered from a cardiac arrest while riding his motorcycle.

== Filmography ==
=== Television ===
List of voice performances in animation
Year	Title	Role	Notes
1991	Bucky O'Hare and the Toad Wars!	AFC Blinky	
1996	Pocket Dragon Adventures	Specs	
1997	Extreme Dinosaurs	Stegz	
1999–2009	Ed, Edd n Eddy	Edd ("Double D")	
1999	Sonic Underground	Sonic the Hedgehog (singing voice)	
2000–03	X-Men: Evolution	Forge	
2001–02	Mary-Kate and Ashley in Action!	Capital D	
2002–05	Baby Looney Tunes	Bugs Bunny, Daffy Duck, Tweety	
2003–06	Martin Mystery	Martin Mystery, Billy	
2004	Dragon Booster	Stewardd, Vociferous	
2005–06	Being Ian	Andy, Scooter Rider 3	
2005–06	Krypto the Superdog	Krypto	
2005–06	Trollz	Alabaster	
2005–08	Class of the Titans	Archie, others	
2006–07	Fantastic Four: World's Greatest Heroes	H.E.R.B.I.E., Trapster, Peter Parker, others	
2006–08	Tom and Jerry Tales	Jerry Mouse	
2007–09	Storm Hawks	Aerrow, Dark Ace	
2007–09	Sushi Pack	Ben, Uni	
2007	Totally Spies	Martin Mystery	Episode: "Totally Mystery Much?"
2008	Holly and Hal Moose: Our Uplifting Christmas Adventure	Hal Moose, Lil' Hal	
2009	RollBots	Spin	
2010	Zeke's Pad	Dr. Bill, Joey, Contest Judge	
2010	Dreamkix	Garcia, Rover	
2010–19	My Little Pony: Friendship Is Magic	Party Favor, Flim Skim, Shopkeeper	
2011–12	Voltron Force	Pidge, others	
2011–12	Rated A for Awesome	Lester "Les" Awesome	
2011–21	Superbook	Chris Quantum, others	
2012–16	Littlest Pet Shop	Russell Ferguson, others	
2012–16	Slugterra	Eli Shane, others	
2012–17	Maya the Bee	Zap, Shelby, Paul, Stinger and Doz	
2013	Max Steel	Steel, Berto	
2013–15	Pac-Man and the Ghostly Adventures	Spiral, Betrayus, President Stratos Spheros	
2014	Wolverine: Origin	Dog, Cookie Malone, others	
2014	Eternals	Sprite, Morjak, others	
2014–15	Dr. Dimensionpants	Kyle Lipton / Dr. Dimensionpants	
2015	Endangered Species	Merl	
2015	Lego Star Wars: Droid Tales	Obi-Wan Kenobi, others	
2015	Dinotrux	Various characters	
2015	Exchange Student Zero	Denmead, Hank, others	
2015–22	The Deep	Smiling Finn, Raraku Elder	
2016–17	LoliRock	Lev	
2017	Marvel Super Hero Adventures	Green Goblin, Miek, Blackjack O'Hare	
2018	Mega Man: Fully Charged	Wave Man	
2018	My Little Pony: Best Gift Ever	Flim, Pony Vendor 1	
2018–22	Ninjago	Lloyd Garmadon / Additional Voices	
2018–19, 2024	The Dragon Prince	Mercenary / Lt. Fen / Allen	5 episodes
2019	44 Cats	Meatball (singing voice)	
2020	Kingdom Force		
2021	My Little Pony: Pony Life	Flim	Episode: "Lolly-Pop"
2023–present	Ninjago: Dragons Rising	Lloyd Garmadon	
2025	Super Team Canada	Byron	Episode: "High School Abuse-ical"

List of voice performances in anime
Year	Title	Role	Notes
1990	Dragon Warrior	Moco	
1998–2002	Ranma ½	Ghost Cat, Pork Bun, Muyakoji Matriarch	
1998	Monkey Magic	Kongo, Sarge	
1999	Video Girl Ai	Takashi Niimain	
1999	Monster Rancher	Hare	
2000	Cardcaptors	Julian Star / Yue	Nelvana dub
2000	Daa! Daa! Daa!	Kanata Saionji	
2001	Saber Marionette J	Mitsurugi Hanagata	
2001	Zoids: New Century 0	Brad Hunter, Sebastian, Dark Judge	
2002	Hamtaro	Dexter, Mr. Haruna	
2002	Transformers: Armada	Sideswipe	
2002	Inuyasha	Gon, Tōkajin	
2002	Project ARMS: The 2nd Chapter	Keith Black	
2003–04	MegaMan NT Warrior	IceMan, NumberMan, Rush	Also Axess
2003	Zoids Fuzors	Malloy	
2003	Infinite Ryvius	Lucson Hojo, Son Doppo	
2004	Mobile Suit Gundam SEED	Athrun Zala	
2004	Dragon Drive	Daisuke Sagiwara	
2005	Human Crossing	Yohei Nozaki	
2005	Tokyo Underground	Teil Ashford	
2005	Transformers Cybertron	Coby, Menasor	
2005	Hikaru no Go	Hikaru Shindou	
2005	Starship Operators	Shimei Yuki, Lee Young Sook	
2005	Mix Master King of Cards	Chino, Grocer, others	
2006	Mobile Suit Gundam SEED Destiny	Athrun Zala	
2006	Ōban Star-Racers	Jordan Wilde	
2006	Powerpuff Girls Z	Jason, Old Squidy	
2007	Ayakashi: Samurai Horror Tales	Kikimaru, Gonbei Naosuke	
2007	Black Lagoon: The Second Barrage	Various characters	
2007	Death Note	Stephen Gevanni, Sidoh	
2007	Ghost in the Shell: Stand Alone Complex	Various characters	Individual Eleven OVA
2008–09	Mobile Suit Gundam 00 series	Tieria Erde, Hong Long	
2009	Nana	Ren Honjo	
2009	Death Note Re-Light 2: L's Successors	Stephen Gevanni	
2012	Kurozuka	Kuon	
2017	Gintama°	Ayame Sarutobi (Genderbend)	
2020	Zoids Wild	Analog, Tremor	

=== Film ===
List of voice performances in direct-to-video and television films
Year	Title	Role	Notes
2000	Casper's Haunted Christmas	Spooky	
2002	Cardcaptor Sakura: The Movie	Julian Star	Nelvana dub
2002	Sabrina: Friends Forever	Craven	
2003	Baby Looney Tunes: Eggs-traordinary Adventure	Bugs, Daffy, Tweety	
2005	My Scene Goes Hollywood: The Movie	Ryan	
2005	Inspector Gadget's Biggest Caper Ever	Looney Purkle	
2005	Action Man: X Missions – The Movie	No-Face, Security Guard, 2nd Commando	
2007	The Condor	Rueben	
2007	Care Bears: Oopsy Does It!	Amigo Bear/Good Luck Bear	
2007	Bratz: Super Babiez	Tater Tot, Expando Kid	
2007	The Grim Adventures of the KND	Edd	Uncredited
2009	Ed, Edd n Eddy's Big Picture Show	Edd	
2010	Planet Hulk	Miek	
2010	Bratz: Pampered Petz	Officer Sterns, Jinxy, Spa Attendant Dan	
2013	Barbie: Mariposa & the Fairy Princess	Boris	
2014	Slugterra: Ghoul from Beyond	Eli Shane	
2014	Slugterra: Return of the Elementals	Eli Shane, Will Shane	
2015	Slugterra: Slug Fu Showdown	Eli Shane, Sedo	
2015	Mune: Guardian of the Moon	Mox	
2015	Barbie & Her Sisters in The Great Puppy Adventure	Marty, Willowfest Client	
2016	Sausage Party	Old Pork Sausage, Refried Beans, Sandwich, Pop Tart, Licorice Rope	
2017	Barbie: Video Game Hero	Virus, Squirrels	
2017	My Little Pony: The Movie	Party Favor	

=== Video games ===
List of voice and English dubbing performances in video games
Year	Title	Role	Notes
2003	Mobile Suit Gundam: Encounters in Space	Peter Scott	English version
2003		Impossible Creatures	Villagers
2005	Ed, Edd n Eddy: The Mis-Edventures	Edd	
2005	Devil Kings	Kahz	English version
2009	Fusionfall	Edd	
2010	Dynasty Warriors: Gundam 2	Athrun Zala	English version
2010	Dead Rising 2	Carl Schliff	
2011	Dynasty Warriors: Gundam 3	Athrun Zala, Tieria Erde	English version
2011	Dead Rising 2: Off the Record	Carl Schliff	
2018	Dragalia Lost	Raemond, Zardin	English version
2025	Dispatch	Charles Kingsley, Person on the Street	

=== Live-action ===
List of live-action roles in films and TV shows
Year	Title	Role	Notes
2005	Hot Properties	Dr. Maurice	
