= Lee Tockar =

Canadian voice actor and visual artist

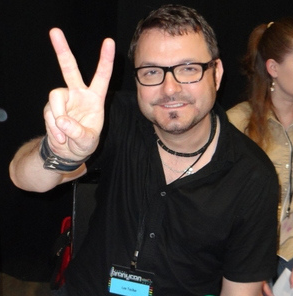
- Tockar at the 2012 Summer BronyCon
- Born: Lee William Tockar; Kelowna, British Columbia, Canada
- Education: Kelowna Secondary School
- Occupations: Voice actor, visual artist
- Years active: 1989–present
- Agent: Caroline Young

Lee William Tockar is a Canadian voice actor and visual artist who works for several studios in Vancouver, British Columbia, Canada. He is also a writer of children's literature, a musician, sculptor, illustrator and collected painter. Tockar is best known for his work on My Little Pony: Friendship Is Magic (as Snips and at least 8 other roles), Ripster in Street Sharks, Bibble in Barbie: Fairytopia, a male Announcer in Barbie Princess Charm School, Eugene "Bling-Bling Boy" Hamilton in Johnny Test, George in the first season of George of the Jungle, Doktor Frogg in League of Super Evil, the titular character of Yakkity Yak, Fidgel from 3-2-1 Penguins!, and the evil Makuta Teridax in the Bionicle films. He also founded FanBuilt.com.

== Early life ==
At the age of five, Tockar told his mother that he wanted to "grow up to be a cartoon". Tockar did not initially understand the concept of a cartoon when he made the statement. At the age of ten, Tockar won first place in a talent show for his vocal impersonations of Kermit the Frog and Bugs Bunny. At the age of 12, Tockar won his first public speaking award for reading a two-thousand word essay on horror films. During his teenage years, before graduating from Kelowna Secondary School, Tockar opened a graphic arts business which enabled him to travel around British Columbia and paint wall murals for restaurants. In 1988, he won the British Columbia Playwright competition for his original work, "Confessions", which was performed at the Waterfront Theatre on Granville Island in Vancouver, British Columbia. A year later in 1989, he was runner-up for his second play, "You Obviously Weren't Listening". In 2008, Tockar was presented with the 2008 Electronic Animation Award for "Best Male Voice-over Artist of the Year" for his portrayal of George in George of the Jungle; the award was handed to him by Family Guy creator and actor Seth MacFarlane.

== Career ==
Tockar is signed under the Alliance of Canadian Cinema, Television and Radio Artists and the Union of British Columbia Performers. Tockar was nominated for the 2012 UBCP/ACTRA Best Voice award. He is the president of Multi Mania Entertainment Incorporated and a co-artistic producer, writer and creator for Holy Molee Entertainment Incorporated. He is also the founding creator and CEO of Fanbuilt Productions. Tockar currently resides in Vancouver, British Columbia.

In 2012, Tockar announced a new project, called FanBuilt, where animators and producers can collaborate on major projects and compete for prizes.

== Filmography ==
- 3-2-1 Penguins! - Fidgel
- Action Dad - Unholy Mackerel
- Action Man: X Missions the Movie - X-Robot 618, News Announcer
- Adventures from the Book of Virtues - Aristotle "Ari" the prairie dog
- Adventures of Sonic the Hedgehog - Additional Voices
- Ark - Gomm
- At Jesus' Side - Miguel
- Barbie as the Princess and the Pauper - Ambassador Bismark, Guard 2
- Barbie: Fairytopia - Bibble, Additional Voices
- Barbie Fairytopia: Magic of the Rainbow - Bibble, Additional Voices
- Barbie: Mariposa - Bibble, Skezite 2
- Barbie: Mermaidia - Bibble, Additional Voices
- Barbie: Princess Charm School - Male Announcer
- Beast Wars: Transformers - Ravager, Ram Horn
- Being Ian - Additional Voices
- Ben Hur - Judes, Additional Voices
- Bionicle: Mask of Light - Makuta, Pewku, Takutanuva
- Bionicle 2: Legends of Metru Nui - Makuta, Kongu
- Bob the Builder - Tiny
- Bratz Kids: Fairy Tales - Additional Voices
- Camelot: The Legend - Mordred, Bandit 2
- Casper's Haunted Christmas - Snivel
- A Christmas Adventure... From a Book Called Wisely's Tales - Mousel
- The Cramp Twins - Dirty Joe Muldoon, Additional Voices
- D'Myna Leagues - Rocky
- Darkstalkers - J. Talbain
- The Deep - Additional Voices
- Dennis the Menace in Cruise Control - Ruff
- Dinosaur Train - Craig Cretoxyrhina, Crab
- Dragon Booster - Parmon Sean, Additional Voices
- Edgar & Ellen - Additional Voices
- Endangered Species - Gull
- Eon Kid - Och
- Exchange Student Zero - Additional Voices
- Extreme Dinosaurs - Haxx, Additional Voices
- Fantastic Four: World's Greatest Heroes - Terminus (uncredited)
- Fat Dog Mendoza - Additional Voices
- G.I. Joe: Spy Troops - Shipwreck
- G.I. Joe: Valor vs. Venom - Shipwreck, Beachhead, Ex-Eel
- Generation O! - Carl
- George of the Jungle - George
- In Search of Santa - Pup, Max, Phillip
- Inspector Gadget's Biggest Caper Ever - Brain, M.A.D. Cat
- Iron Man: Armored Adventures - MODOK
- Johnny Test (2005) - General, Bling-Bling Boy, Mayor Howard, Speed McCool, Albert, Additional Voices
- Johnny Test (2021) - Bling-Bling Boy, Additional Voices
- Kate & Mim-Mim - Mim-Mim
- Kong: King of the Apes - Kong, Commissioner Decker, Additional Voices
- Krypto the Superdog - Stretch-o-Mutt
- League of Super Evil - Doktor Frogg, Additional Voices
- Lego Star Wars: The Yoda Chronicles - Darth Maul, Nute Gunray
- Lego Star Wars: Droid Tales - Darth Maul, Nute Gunray, Additional Voices
- The Little Prince - The Hunter, Swindly
- Littlest Pet Shop (1995) - Chet
- Littlest Pet Shop (2012) - Sideburns, Mr. McHat
- Make Way for Noddy - Bumpy Dog, Mr. Sparks
- Mary Engelbreit's the Night Before Christmas - Gregory
- Max Steel - Prism Link, Additional Voices
- Max Steel: The Wrath of Makino - Prism Link
- Mega Man - Vile
- Milo's Bug Quest - Bud
- ¡Mucha Lucha! - French Twist, El Loco Mosquito, Additional Voices
- ¡Mucha Lucha!: The Return of El Malefico - El Loco Mosquito
- My Little Pony: Equestria Girls – Better Together - Snips
- My Little Pony: Equestria Girls - Snips
- My Little Pony: Equestria Girls – Holidays Unwrapped - Snips
- My Little Pony: Equestria Girls – Sunset's Backstage Pass - Snips, Festival Artist, Festival Intern
- My Little Pony: Equestria Girls – Legend of Everfree - Snips
- My Little Pony: Equestria Girls – Rainbow Rocks - Snips
- My Little Pony: Friendship Is Magic - Snips, Steven Magnet, Spot the Diamond Dog, Uncle Wing, Beaver Foreman, Hippo-Riding Foal, Gummy, Coriander Cumin, Smoked Oat Owner
- NASCAR Racers - Phil "Octane" Knox
- Nerds and Monsters - Urp, Feathered Beast, Singing Fish, Ketchup Monster
- Ninjago - Cyrus Borg, Additional Voices
- Ninjago: Dragons Rising - Drix
- Ninjago Legacy: Reimagined - Cyrus Borg
- Norm of the North: Keys to the Kingdom - Fong, Rick Seal, Polar Bear #2, Random Onlooker
- Norm of the North: King Sized Adventure - Fong, Student #3
- Norm of the North: Family Vacation - Fong, Rick Seal, Myrtle the Turtle
- Open Season: Scared Silly - McSquizzy, Buddy, Deputy #1
- Pac-Man and the Ghostly Adventures - Inky, Cyclops Ghost, Tall Fed, Kingpin Obtuse
- Pirate Express - Captain LaPoutine
- Planet Hulk - Android
- Playmobil: The Secret of Pirate Island - Pegger, Poggie, Buckethead
- Pucca - Abyo, Tobe, Dada, Police Chief Bruce
- Ratchet & Clank - Mr. Micron
- Robin and the Dreamweavers - Randy
- Roswell Conspiracies: Aliens, Myths and Legends - Dorn, Lt. Randall Crow
- Rudolph the Red-Nosed Reindeer and the Island of Misfit Toys - Charlie in the Box, Gingerbread Guard, Windup Mouse
- Rudolph the Red-Nosed Reindeer: The Movie - Milo the Elf, Vixen, Ridley
- Silverwing - Luger, Romulus
- Slugterra - Pronto the Magnificent, Additional Voices
- Slugterra: Ghoul from Beyond - Pronto the Magnificent
- Slugterra: Return of the Elementals - Pronto the Magnificent
- Slugterra: Slug Fu Showdown - Pronto the Magnificent, Glasses, Loade
- Sonic Underground - Additional Voices
- Stellaluna - Askan
- Storm Hawks - Wren, Absolute Zero #4
- Street Sharks - Ripster/John Bolton
- Superbook - Additional Voices
- Supernoobs - Roach
- Tarzan and Jane - Kong
- The Ten Commandments - Dathan
- Tobot - Tobot Z
- ToddWorld - Barry
- The Twisted Whiskers Show - Dash, Zippy the Greyhound
- VeggieTales - Milano, Dorito
- The Wacky World of Tex Avery - Genghis, Little Buddy
- Walter Melon - Sneero
- Yakkity Yak - Yakkity Yak
- Yam Roll - Yam Roll
- Yvon of the Yukon - Admiral, Additional Voices
