= Shannon Chan-Kent =

Canadian actress (born 1988)

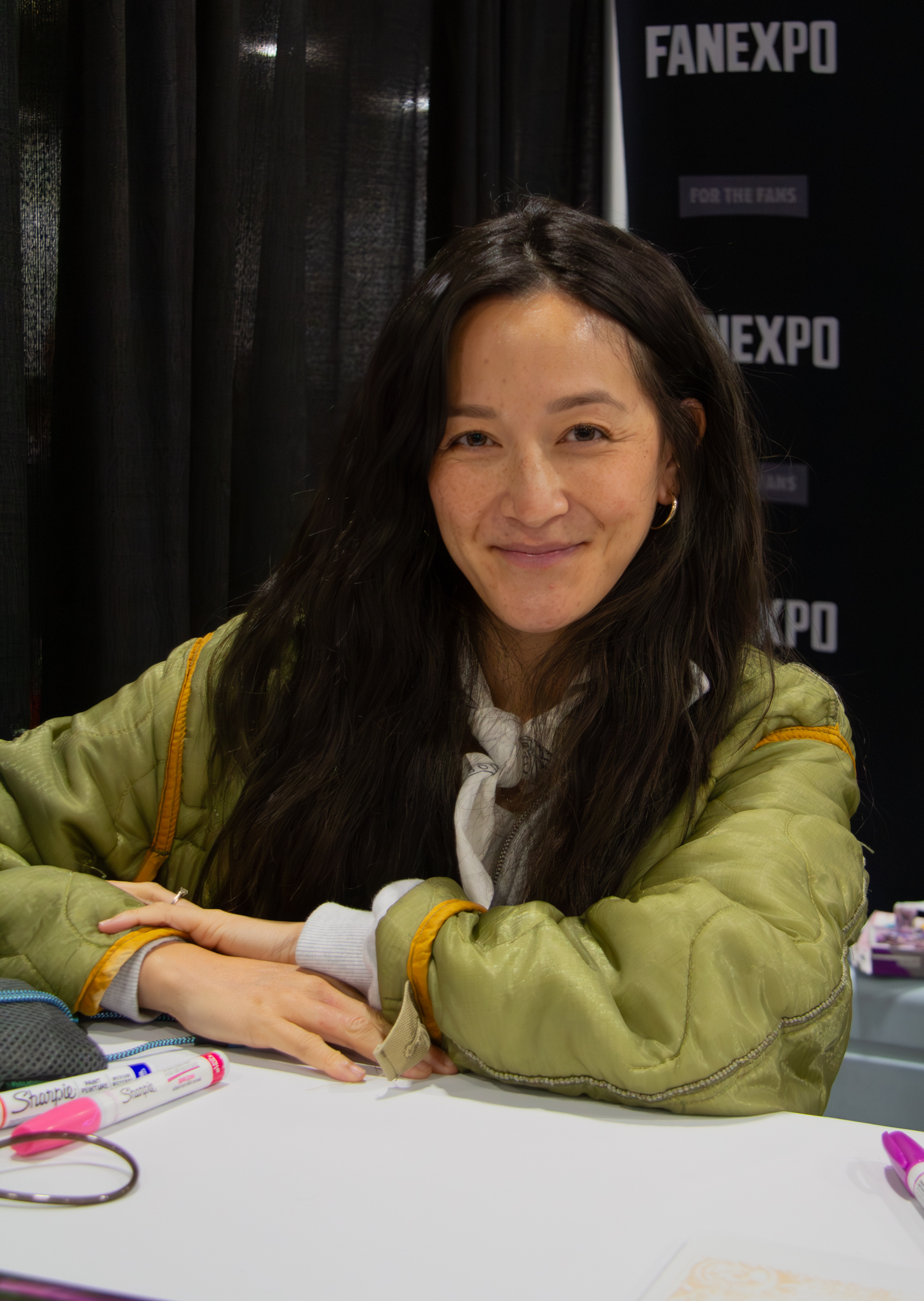
- Chan-Kent in 2026
- Born: September 23, 1988 (age 38); Vancouver, British Columbia, Canada
- Other name: Shannon Kent
- Education: University of British Columbia
- Occupation: Actress
- Years active: 2002–present
- Known for: My Little Pony: Friendship Is Magic; Littlest Pet Shop; Death Note; Pucca; Sabrina's Secret Life; Slugterra; Sonic Prime
- Spouse: Andrew Francis (m. 2018)

Shannon Chan-Kent (born September 23, 1988) is a Canadian voice and stage actress. She is known for her roles as Silver Spoon, Smolder and the singing voice of Pinkie Pie in My Little Pony: Friendship Is Magic, Misa Amane in the English dub of Death Note, and the Biskit twins and Youngmee Song on Littlest Pet Shop. She also portrays Joy Pepper in the rebooted Superbook, the Chief in Pucca, Courtney's best friend Janet in Spectacular!, and Amy Rose in Sonic Prime.

In addition to her voice acting career, she is also an opera singer (soprano), having graduated with bachelor's and master's degrees in Opera from the University of British Columbia. Chan-Kent has performed with the Vancouver Metropolitan Orchestra as well as with local theater productions.

== Filmography ==
Animation
Year	Title	Role	Reference
2018–2022	16 Hudson	Mrs. Wu, Joyce	
	Adventures of Ayuma	Noxana	
2010	Barbie: A Fashion Fairytale	Delphine	
2011	Barbie: Princess Charm School	Princess Isla	
2013	Barbie & Her Sisters in A Pony Tale	Marie	
2008	Barbie in a Christmas Carol	Ann, Nan	
2010	Barbie in a Mermaid Tale	Deandra	
2017	Barbie: Video Game Hero	Renee, Maia	
2017	Barbie: Dolphin Magic	Isla	
2016–2018	Beat Bugs	Freda	
2005–2008	Being Ian	Grace Chou Lum, Nurse Bradley, Hoop Earrings Student	
2005	Care Bears: Big Wish Movie	Love-a-Lot Bear	
2007–2010	Care Bears: Adventures in Care-a-lot	Tweazle, Friend Bear, Birthday Bear	
2010	Care Bears: The Giving Festival	Tweazle, Friend Bear, Birthday Bear, Love-a-Lot Bear	
	Care Bears to the Rescue	Tweazle	
2017	Chuck's Choice	Ms. Cho, Principal Principle	
2005–2008	Class of the Titans	Lydia	
2018–2021	Corner Gas Animated	60's Girl No. 1, Alison, Lin, Bu-Hu	
2009–2021	Dinosaur Train	Allie Alamosaurus	
2015–2018	Dinotrux	Knock-Itt, Ankylodump No. 2 (5)	
2014–2015	Dr. Dimensionpants	Rebecca	
	Duck on Call	Millie Mechanic	
2019–2021	Fast & Furious: Spy Racers	Film Director	
	Fruit Ninja: Frenzy Force	Niya	
2017–2019	Get Shorty	The Assistant, Linda	
	Ghost Patrol	Harper Avery, Aunt Lulabell	
	Hydee and the Hytops	Mariko	
2016–2018	Kong: King of the Apes	Dr. Amy Quon	
2012–2016	Littlest Pet Shop	Brittany Biskit, Whittany Biskit, Youngmee Song, Mrs. Biskit, Madison, Phoebe, Brittman Biskit, Whittman Biskit, Furry Fury, Whale	
2018	Littlest Pet Shop: A World of Our Own	Yamua Beetlemoto, Penelope Puggerson, Rima Rhymalayan, Millie McMallard, Pearl the Salon Cat, Russian Blue Cat, Lola Butterflew, Ray, Pinka Carrots, Ittybit, Owl Bunny, Vicky Cattily, Kate Cattily, Madame Fluffkins, Scrapper #4, Yellow The Salon Cat, Amber Kittyson, Lavander Catkin, Baby Jade Catkin, Buttercup Catkin, Phoenix Catkin, Adult Sonia, Dottie Cheetahstein, Sada Persiafluff, Zombie Cat, Sada Scootsfield, Fluffy Catson, Bella Scootsfield, Sugarberry Fluffcat, Hima Himalaya, Annie Coldhare, Rei Angelfish, Sherbet Bunnyton, Poco La Playa, Katie Perrito, Perky Peacoat, Banfoe McCatty, Dessert Bunnyton, Cleo Curlycat, Catalina Scrapper, Jan Bunnyton Alabaster Scottsfold, Glowy Meow, Maggie Lemoncat, Lila Pearly, Whimsy, Mei Tanpaws, Kissies, Ocean Cattily, Flower Cattily, Wynter Cattily	
2002	Madeline: My Fair Madeline	Chloe	
2005	Madeline: Madeline in Tahiti	Chloe	
2010	Maryoku Yummy	Maryoku	
2018–2019	Mega Man: Fully Charged	Ashley Adderley	
2013	My Little Pony: Equestria Girls	Pinkie Pie (singing voice)	
2017	My Little Pony: Equestria Girls (2017 television specials)	Lemon Zest	
2014	My Little Pony: Equestria Girls – Rainbow Rocks	Pinkie Pie (singing voice)	
2015	My Little Pony: Equestria Girls – Friendship Games	Pinkie Pie (singing voice), Lemon Zest	
2016	My Little Pony: Equestria Girls – Legend of Everfree	Pinkie Pie (singing voice)	
2018	My Little Pony: Equestria Girls – Forgotten Friendship	Pinkie Pie (singing voice), Wallflower Blush	
2017	My Little Pony: The Movie	Pinkie Pie (singing voice)	
2019	My Little Pony: Equestria Girls – Sunset's Backstage Pass	Pinkie Pie (singing voice), Sonata Dusk (singing voice)	
2010–2019	My Little Pony: Friendship Is Magic	Pinkie Pie (singing voice on most songs (Note: Andrea Libman, the speaking voice of Pinkie Pie, also provides Pinkie's singing voice for some songs.)), Silver Spoon, Smolder, Aura, Roma, Citrus Blush, Cayenne, Vendor, Hippogriff Sailor, Tootsie Flute, Girl Pony, Posh Pony, Fashionable Pony, Student 2, Ocellus (singing voice), Raspberry Dazzle	
2019	My Little Pony: Rainbow Roadtrip	Pinkie Pie (singing voice)	
2020–2021	My Little Pony: Pony Life	Cowgirl Pony, Butterscotch, Spring Parade, Angel	
2014–2016	Nerds and Monsters	Org	
2011–2022	Ninjago	Racer Seven, Hostess	
	Novelmore	Pyralia, Bar Maid	
2015	Open Season: Scared Silly	Rosie, Marcia	
2024	Orion and the Dark	Adult Hypatia	
2018–2025	Polly Pocket	Lila Draper, Miss Betts, Susie, Andre Anderson, Sun, Brandon, Female Guard, Newswoman, Cheryl, Cordelia, Jane	
2006–2008	Pucca	Chief, Voice Talent	
2011	Quest for Zhu	Pipsqueak	
2016–2020	Rainbow Ruby	Gina	
2003–2004	Sabrina's Secret Life	Margaux, Additional Voices	
	Sara Solves It	Sara	
2008–2013	Skechers	Mariko	
2012–2016	Slugterra	Beatrice "Trixie" Sting, Blue-Haired Old Woman, Woman Dodging Slugs, Trini, Woman Fawning Over Eli	
2014	Slugterra: Ghoul from Beyond	Beatrice "Trixie" Sting	
2014	Slugterra: Return of the Elementals	Beatrice "Trixie" Sting	
2014	Slugterra: Slug Fu Showdown	Beatrice "Trixie" Sting, Sally, Shorty	
2015	Slugterra: Eastern Caverns	Beatrice "Trixie" Sting, Outlaw Girl, Flower	
2022–2024	Sonic Prime	Amy Rose, Rusty Rose, Thorn Rose, Black Rose	
2010–2015	Strawberry Shortcake's Berry Bitty Adventures	Cherry Jam (speaking voice), Berrykin Bonnie, Princess Berrykin (singing voice)	
2021–2024	Strawberry Shortcake: Berry in the Big City	Raspberry Tart (singing voice), Cherry Jam, Sweet Grapes, Customer #3, Bubblegum, Girl #2, Little Girl	
2011–2021	Superbook	Joy Pepper, Servant Girls, Baby	
2022	Supernatural Academy	Elda Kristov, Opal, Shan, Carmen	
2016	Supernoobs	Stacy (Episode: "Noob It or Lose It")	
2018–2019	Super Dinosaur	Erin Kingston, Erica Kingston	
2016	The Deep	Jess Gorman, Fontaine (Episode: "Lonesome Jim")	
2012	The Little Prince	Jouna ("The Planet of the Gargand" trilogy, episodes 42–44)	
2022	The Sea Beast	Fen	
2017–2020	Unikitty!	Misty, Pandeal, Catficorn	
2011–2012	Voltron Force	Larmina	
2017	We're Lalaloopsy	Dot Starlight (singing voice), Fluffy Pouncy Paws, Alice in Lalaloopsyland, Lady Stillwaiting, Jelly Wiggle Jiggle, Snowy Fairest, Happy Daisy Crown, Whimsy Sugar Puff, Lucky Lil' Bug, Boo Scaredy Cat, Kat Jungle Roar	
	Lale Ki Lolu	Lale, Various	

Anime
Year	Title	Role	Reference
	Black Lagoon: Roberta's Blood Trail	Fabiola Iglesias	
2007–2008	Death Note	Misa Amane	
	Kingdom	He Liao Diao	
	Little Astro Boy	Kinako	
2011–2012	Little Battlers Experience	Amy Cohen	
2007–2009	Mobile Suit Gundam 00	Christina Sierra	
2010	Mobile Suit Gundam 00 the Movie: A Wakening of the Trailblazer	Christina Sierra	
2008	The Girl Who Leapt Through Time	Miyuki Konno	

Live-action
Year	Title	Role	Reference
2021	Another Life	Lara (season 2)	
2008	Death Note	Misa Amane (English dub)	
2008	Death Note 2: The Last Name	Misa Amane (English dub)	
2007	Dragon Boys	Kelsey Leung	
2021	Good Trouble	Ruby (season 3)	
2013	Kill for Me	Zoe	
2009	L: Change the World	Misa Amane (English dub)	
2010–2011	Life Unexpected	Brynn	
2008	Samurai Girl	Attendant	
2011–2012	The Secret Circle	Calvin's Niece	
	The Selection	Tiny Lee	
2009	Spectacular!	Janet	
2009–2013	The Troop	Shellie	
2018	Trial & Error	Clem Tuckett (season 2)	
2018	Life Sentence	Finley	
2015–2021	Supergirl	Elizabeth Hawkings	
2020	Sonic the Hedgehog	Roadhouse Waitress	
2020–2022	Woke	Cindy	
2021–2025	You	Kiki (seasons 3–5)	

Stage
Year	Title	Role	Reference
2016	The Flick	Rose (Granville Island Stage, Vancouver)	
2003–2009	Avenue Q	(Arts Club Theatre Company production)	
	Evita	Peron's Mistress (Vancouver Opera production)	
	Beauty and the Beast	Stanley Industrial Alliance Stage, Vancouver, playing Belle	

Film
Year	Title	Role	Reference
2019	In the Key of Love	Sasha	
2022	A Big Fat Family Christmas	Hallmark, playing Liv	
2023	Field Day	Hallmark, playing Kelly	
