= Slugterra: Ghoul from Beyond =

- Promotional poster
- Written by: Scott Sonneborn
- Directed by: Johnny Darrell; Barry Karnowski; Logan McPherson
- Starring: Sam Vincent; Andrew Francis; Lee Tockar; Shannon Chan-Kent
- Theme music composer: Brian Carson
- Country of origin: Canada
- Original languages: English; French

Production
- Producers: Asaph Fipke; Chuck Johnson; Ken Faier
- Cinematography: Phil Memeux
- Editor: Stephen I. Sandoval
- Running time: 44 minutes
- Production company: Nerd Corps Entertainment

Original release
- Network: Disney XD Canada
- Release: March 30, 2014

Slugterra: Ghoul from Beyond is a 2014 Canadian animated television film produced by Nerd Corps Entertainment. It premiered on March 30, 2014 on Disney XD and is the first film based on the 2012 Canadian animated series Slugterra.

== Plot ==
After the defeat of Dr. Blakk and the Dark Bane, things have started to get back to normal in Slugterra. Unfortunately now that Blakk is out of the picture, every criminal gang in Slugterra are staking their claim, worst yet they're all armed with Mega-morph blasters. After dealing with the scrap force in the mall the group receives a S.O.S. from the King of Sling: a group of Mega-Morph Ghoul armed marauders are tearing apart his home cavern, but with Ghouls.

Arriving there the group spots the Marauders rounding up every Fandango they can find, while they are fighting the Marauders sees Burpy as an Infernous and leaves but not before the Shane Gang chases them after they appear to hit the edge of Slugterra. (It is explained that the cavern is the easternmost cavern in all of Slugterra, the only thing further east is a solid wall.) The Marauders use the Fandagos to power a Terra-portal to an Asian cavern system and bring's through their leader the Dark Slinger, armed with a Ghoul Boon Doc, dubbed a Goon.

During the fight Doc is sucked into the Slug ways and Burpy goes after him, which becomes highly problematic when the Goon is revealed to have the power to transform Slugs into ghouls, and is soon revealed to be the true leader of the Marauders. The Goon hits Eli and enters his mind: it explains that the Dark Slinger was the protector of his cavern system, with the Ghouled Infernus he was wielding as proof, before he took him over.

A little while back he began to sense the appearance of Ghouls in Slugterra and curious he began to make his way there but not before Eli tells he and his stop stopped the one making the ghouls, Dr. Blakk. Now the Goon is searching for the strongest Slinger in Slugterra to facilitate its takeover, and as its protector that would be Eli. Now that it has a hold on Eli the Goon orders its men to take the Fandagos back through the terra-portal to keep powering it so that they can bring the conquering army through.

Pronto goes through the portal and rescues the Fandagos, now not only is the Goon trapped on this side of the portal but is also cut off from his army as well. However it's soon revealed to be something of a hollow victory as Eli is now under the Goon's complete control and is turned against his friends. Luckily Burpy comes in with Doc and breaks the Goon's control over him before the Goon flees in terror into the Slug ways.

Through the remains of his link with the Goon Eli senses him working to rebuild his army, create more ghouls and look for a new host. They also have a new ally to defeat the Goon: his former host Junjie, champion of the Eastern Caverns.

== Cast ==
- Sam Vincent as Eli Shane
- Andrew Francis as Kord, Mongo
- Lee Tockar as Pronto
- Shannon Chan-Kent as Trixie
- Brian Drummond as Boss Ember
- Ian James Corlett as Straggus
- Trevor Devall as The King of Sling
- Brian Dobson as Dark Slinger / Goon Doc
- Michael Dobson as Millard

== Release ==
The movie aired on Family Chrgd on March 31, 2014, and was made on DVD and purchasable on Amazon June 10, 2014 in United States by Shout! Factory including a short one-minute Slugisode called "Burpy and Friends Take a Dive". The film is airing on Disney XD in Poland, South Africa, Turkey, the Middle East and Greece August 16 or/and 17. Ghoul from Beyond airs on Disney XD in the US August 20, 2014.
