= Brian Dobson (actor) =

Canadian voice actor

- Born: September 9 Montreal, Quebec, Canada
- Citizenship: United Kingdom; Canada
- Occupation: Voice actor
- Years active: 1996–present
- Relatives: Michael Dobson (brother); Paul Dobson (brother)
- Website: briandobsonvo.com

Brian Dobson (born September 9) is a Canadian voice actor, who works for Ocean Studios and various other studios in Vancouver, British Columbia, Canada. He voiced Thing in Fantastic Four: World's Greatest Heroes, Skeletor in He-Man and the Masters of the Universe, Majin Buu and Dr. Gero in the Ocean dub of Dragon Ball Z, Red Alert in Transformers: Armada and Transformers: Cybertron, Lex Luthor in Krypto the Superdog, Muso in Inuyasha, Martin DaCosta in Mobile Suit Gundam SEED and SEED Destiny, and Zugu, Ronin, Soul Archer, a Ninjdroid Sentry, and Bucko in LEGO Ninjago: Masters of Spinjitzu.

== Early life ==
Brian Dobson was born in Montreal, Quebec, Canada, but spent most of his childhood in England. He is the youngest of the three Dobson brothers. His older brothers Michael Dobson and Paul Dobson are also voice actors.

== Filmography ==
=== Anime English dubbing ===
- .hack//Roots - AI Harald
- Death Note - Hideki Ide, Kiichiro Osoreda, Rod Ross
- Dragon Ball Z - Dr. Gero, Majin Buu (Evil Buu, Super Buu, Kid Buu), Future Gohan, Vodka (Ocean dub)
- Hello Carbot - Beatrun
- Inuyasha - Muso, Shoga
- Kingdom series - Ren Pa
- MegaMan NT Warrior - SearchMan EXE, Arashi Kazefuki
- Mobile Suit Gundam - Dren, Garma Zabi
- Mobile Suit Gundam SEED - Martin DaCosta
- Mobile Suit Gundam SEED Destiny - Martin DaCosta, Heine Westenfluss, Orson White
- Mobile Suit Gundam Wing - Lt. Mueller
- Mobile Suit Gundam 00 - Lee Zhejiang, Bring Stabity, Divine Nova
- Ōban Star-Racers - Grooor, General Kross, Sül
- Ranma ½ - Dragon Whisker Salesman
- The Story of Saiunkoku - Courtier #2, Guard #3
- Sword of the Stranger - Shogen Itadori
- Superbook - Michael the Archangel, Parshan, Joseph, Wiseman # 2, Paul, Boaz, Saul, Workers
- Transformers: Armada - Red Alert
- Transformers: Cybertron - Red Alert, Clocker
- World Trigger - Hyrein
- Zoids: Fuzors - Helmut, Dr. Piers

=== Animation ===
- Chip and Potato - Little Poppa, Aardvark Grandpa, Octopus, Bertie Bumpety-Bump, Farmer Pat
- Dinotrux - D-Stroy, Ankylodump #1 (4), Dozeratops
- Dr. Dimensionpants - Evil Wizard Silas
- Dreamkix - Mr. Krimke
- Fantastic Four: World's Greatest Heroes - Thing
- Fruit Ninja: Frenzy Force - Krackleflint
- He-Man and the Masters of the Universe - Keldor / Skeletor, Buzz-Off, Webstor, King Hiss, Sssqueeze
- Hot Wheels Battle Force 5 - Zorax/Sheriff Johnson
- Krypto the Superdog - Lex Luthor
- LeapFrog - Additional Voices
- Ninjago - Ronin Kognito, Soul Archer, Sumo Zumo, Nindroid Sentry, Bucko
- Lego Star Wars: The Freemaker Adventures - JEK
- Martin Mystery - Boogeyman
- Max Steel - Jason Naught / Dwayne
- My Little Pony: Friendship Is Magic - Sky Beak
- Nerds and Monsters - Zarg, Young Monster #3, Irwin's Narrator Voice, Monktopus
- Pac-Man and the Ghostly Adventures
- Pirate Express - Ares
- Pucca - Uncle Dumpling
- Rated A for Awesome - Max Awesome
- Super Dinosaur - Bruce Kingston, Mechanical Dinohead, Dino Man (3), Wannabe Alpha Dino Man, Dino Man #1 (3), Croco Gator, Earth Core Agent (4), Male Earth Core Tech (1), Earth Core Agent #2 (2), Earth Core Agent #1 (2)
- Sushi Pack - Unagi
- Tarzan and Jane - Shopkeeper, Goon 4
- Team Galaxy - Principal Kirkpatrick, Mr. Spoersqlippe
- The Cramp Twins - Cougar Ron
- The Hollow - Toros, Minotaur #1
- The Little Prince - Caracatus (The Planet of Time)
- Underworld: Endless War - Vregis
- Yvon of the Yukon - Helicopter Instructor, Additional Voices

=== Film ===
- Bob the Builder: Mega Machines - Thud (US)
- Escape from Planet Earth - Hazmats
- G.I. Joe: Spy Troops - Flint
- G.I. Joe: Valor vs. Venom - Flint
- Holly Hobbie & Friends: Fabulous Fashion Show - Uncle Dave, Portia's Dad
- Holly Hobbie & Friends: Marvelous Makeover - Uncle Dave
- Monster High: The Movie - Eye (voice)
- My Little Pony: The Movie - Verko
- Ratchet & Clank - Announcer, Drek Computer
- Sausage Party - Italian Tomato, Lettuce
- Slugterra: Ghoul from Beyond - The Goon
- Slugterra: Return of the Elementals - The Goon
- Underworld: Endless War - Lycan Vregis

=== Video games ===
- Dead Rising 2: Case:0 - Jed Wright
- Dispatch - Blob Goon, Orange Ski, Granny
- Frogger's Adventures: The Rescue - Army Frog, Ninja Frog
- Frogger: Ancient Shadow – Igunis, Lion Papa
- Frogger Beyond - Future Elder, Magic Elder
- He-Man: Defender of Grayskull - Skeletor
- Kessen - Matabe's Goto, Ankokuji Ekei, Tōdō Takatora, Retainer East (English dubbed version)
- Prototype - Additional voices
- Sins of a Solar Empire - Various
- Trinity: Souls of Zill Ơll - Dagda, Zofor (English dubbed version)
- Warhammer 40,000: Dawn of War 2 - Space Marine, Ork Boyz
- Warhammer 40,000: Dawn of War: Dark Crusade - Earth Caste Builder, Shield Drone, Drone Squad, Flash Gitz, Grey Knights, and Governor-Militant Lukas Alexander
- Ys VI: The Ark of Napishtim - Commander Ernst (English dubbed version)
