= Cathy Weseluck =

Canadian actress

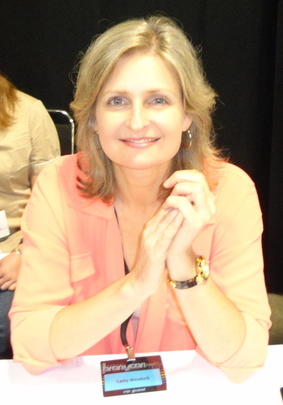
- Weseluck at the 2012 Summer BronyCon Convention
- Occupation: Actress
- Years active: 1986–present

Cathy Weseluck is a Canadian actress who frequently works with Ocean Productions in Vancouver, British Columbia and is known for her roles as Near in Death Note, Cybersix/Adrian Seidelman in Cybersix, and Spike in Discovery Family's My Little Pony: Friendship Is Magic.

== Early life ==
Weseluck was born to Nina and Conn Weseluck. She has Russian ancestry. Her relatives are from the Russian Empire or the Soviet Union (now territory in Belarus).

== Career ==
=== Radio ===
Before becoming a voice actress, Weseluck was an associate producer at CBC Radio until one of the hosts encouraged her to try voice acting. Her first voice work was a radio spot for the Vancouver Centre Mall.

=== Voice acting ===
Weseluck has provided voices for many cartoon and anime series. She has provided the voice of Mirai Yashima in Mobile Suit Gundam, Dorothy Catalonia and Catherine Bloom in Gundam Wing, Near in Death Note, Cybersix in Cybersix, Shampoo in Ranma 1/2, Kagome's mother in Inuyasha, Verne in U.B.O.S., Misa Takatsuki in Project ARMS, and Kid Trunks, Chiaotzu, and Puar in Dragon Ball Z (among many others). She also voices Spike and several background characters in the animated children's series My Little Pony: Friendship Is Magic.

In addition to her voice-over work, she is also a voice director and instructor. She served as singing director on My Little Pony Tales, casting coordinator on Animated Classic Showcase for Film Roman, voice director for the English version of Spiff and Hercules, casting director on The Authentic Adventures of Professor Thompson and dubbing director on Billy the Cat.

== Filmography ==
=== Web productions ===
- #TweetIt: Featuring My Little Pony Staff and Bronies – Herself

=== Anime dubbing ===
- B-Daman Fireblast – Riki Ryugasaki
- Beyblade Burst - Jin Aizawa
- Black Lagoon – Garcia Lovelace
- Cybersix – Cybersix (Adrian Seidelman)
- Dragon Ball Z (Ocean Dub) – Chiaotzu, Puar, East Kai, Kid Trunks, Android 19, Chiko, Lemilia, Marron, Erasa, Bra
- Death Note – Near/Nate River, additional female voices
- Funky Fables – Various characters
- Gintama° – Young Katsura Kotaro
- Hamtaro – Snoozer, Laura's Mom, Omar
- Hikaru no Go – Yuki Mitani, Hikaru's Mom
- Kurozuka – Saniwa
- MegaMan: NT Warrior - Kid Grave
- Mega Man: Upon a Star – Mrs. Kobayashi
- Mobile Suit Gundam and Mobile Suit Gundam: Char's Counterattack – Mirai Yashima
- Mobile Suit Gundam Wing – Catherine Bloom (35-49), Dorothy Catalonia
- Gundam Wing: Endless Waltz – Catherine Bloom (Movie Version only), Dorothy Catalonia
- Mobile Suit Gundam 00 – Kati Mannequin, Revive Revival
- Ghost in the Shell S.A.C. Individual Eleven – Tachikoma
- Ghost in the Shell S.A.C. Laughing Man – Tachikoma
- The Hakkenden – Shinbei Inue/Daihachi
- Hamtaro – Marian Haruna, Kylie's cousin Ethan, Snoozer, Omar, additional voices
- Inuyasha – Kagome's mother/Mrs. Higurashi, Ayumi, Additional voices
- Inuyasha: The Final Act - Kagome's mother/Mrs. Higurashi, Ayumi
- Let's Go Quintuplets – Harold
- Monkey Magic – Empress Dowager
- The New Adventures of Kimba The White Lion – Additional Voices
- Ogre Slayer – Setsuko
- Powerpuff Girls Z – Ken Utonium, Bubbles' Grandmother
- Project A-ko – C-ko Kotobuki
- Project ARMS – Misa
- Ranma ½ – Shampoo, Azusa Shiratori, Yuka, Additional Voices
- Shakugan no Shana – Khamsin Nbh'w (Season 1)
- Super Kid – Gokdari
- The Story of Saiunkoku – Court Lady 3, Lady, Lady of the Night 3, Ryushin
- Transformers: Armada – Boy at Carnival
- World Trigger – Yuma Kuga
- Yashahime - Mrs. Higurashi/Grammy

=== Live-action English dubbing ===
- L: Change the World - Kimiko Kujo/K

=== Animation ===
- 1001 Nights – Shahzaman
- 16 Hudson – Luc, TV Cook
- Aaagh! It's the Mr. Hell Show! – Additional Voices
- Adventures of Mowgli – Young Mowgli
- Lobo - Marco Van Helsing
- Animated Classic Showcase – Various characters
- A Very Fairy Christmas – Sandy Adams, Tracey Garcia
- Barbie: A Fashion Fairytale – Wicked Queen
- The Barbie Diaries – Principal Peters, Passing Girl 1
- Barbie: Fairytopia – Dizzle
- Barbie in the Nutcracker – Maid
- Barbie: Mariposa – Zinzee, Dizzle, Fairy Speck
- Barbie Presents: Thumbelina – Janessa
- Barbie: Princess Charm School – Female Announcer, Keypad
- Barbie: Spy Squad – Aunt Zoe
- Being Ian – Evil Dutch Girls, Teenager, Hans' Sister
- Billy the Cat – Additional Voices
- BoBoiBoy – Ochobot
- Bratz: Girlz Really Rock – Ms. Higgins
- Camp Candy – Additional Voices
- Capertown Cops – Coco Loco
- Captain Zed and the Zee Zone – Additional Voices
- A Christmas Adventure... From a Book Called Wisely's Tales – Darryl, Kimberoo
- Class of the Titans – Envy
- Cosmic Quantum Ray – Mother Brainhead
- The Cramp Twins – Miss Hissy, Mrs. Winkle, Kid #2
- Dragon Tales – Miss Tree, Dragon Fairy, Yellow Puzzle Door
- Dreamkix – Roy, Henrietta, Alice
- Dr. Dimensionpants – Thora
- Edgar & Ellen – Judith, Mrs. Pimm
- Exosquad – Additional Voices
- Firehouse Tales – Milkie
- Generation O! – Chadd, Janine
- Holly and Hal Moose: Our Uplifting Christmas Adventure – Mrs. Claus
- Hurricanes – Additional Voices
- In Search of Santa – Emma, William, Wing Maiden #4, Wing Maiden #6
- Iron Man: Armored Adventures – Abigail Brand
- Johnny Test – Squirrely Girl
- Kid vs. Kat – Dennis
- A Kind of Magic – Mrs. Lumberg
- Kissyfur – Bessie the Goose (Recorded promo only)
- Kleo the Misfit Unicorn – Tara, Emily, Mrs. Piggott, Sami
- Krypto the Superdog – Additional Voices
- Lapitch the Little Shoemaker – Lapitch
- Littlest Pet Shop (1995) – Additional Voices
- Littlest Pet Shop (2012) – Buttercream Sundae, Judi Jo Jameson, Jane
- Make Way for Noddy – Cecilia Bug
- Martin Mystery – Additional voices
- Maryoku Yummy – Fij Fij, Baburu, Enro
- Mega Man – Doris, Robobeautician
- Molly of Denali — Charlotte (Episode: "The Night Manager")
- My Little Pony: Friendship Is Magic – Spike, Mayor Mare, Coco Pommel, miscellaneous voices
- My Little Pony: Equestria Girls – Spike
- My Little Pony: Equestria Girls – Rainbow Rocks – Spike
- My Little Pony: Equestria Girls – Friendship Games – Spike
- My Little Pony: Equestria Girls – Legend of Everfree – Spike
- My Little Pony: The Movie – Spike
- My Little Pony: Best Gift Ever – Spike
- My Little Pony: Rainbow Roadtrip – Spike
- My Little Pony: The Runaway Rainbow – Rarity the Unicorn, Ice Scoop
- Nilus the Sandman – Pearl the Talking Clam
- Ninjago – Real Estate Agent
- ReBoot – Backup
- Ricky Sprocket – Robot
- Robin and the Dreamweavers
- RoboCop: Alpha Commando – Additional Voices
- RollBots – Penny, Mayor Aria
- Roswell Conspiracies: Aliens, Myths and Legends – Additional Voices
- Rudolph the Red-Nosed Reindeer: The Movie – Sparkle the Sprite, Elf Crowd Member #1
- Sitting Ducks – Drill Sergeant Duck
- Spiff and Hercules – Additional Voices
- Stone Protectors – Empress Opal
- Storm Hawks – Ravess
- Superbook – Gizmo
- Super Trolls
- A Tale of Two Kitties – Spunky
- Tayo the Little Bus – Toni (Season 1–5)
- Team Galaxy – Fluffy
- Team Tonka – Scan
- The Adventures of Corduroy – Additional Voices
- The Deep – Hickman
- The Little Prince season 2 – Okoda (D 0101 > B 743 The Planet of the Crystal Tears) and The School Teacher (D 455 > W 5613 The Planet of the Astrotrainiacs)
- The New Adventures of He-Man – Teela
- The New Adventures of Lucky Luke – Big Bone Bear
- The Triplets – The Bored Witch (Season 1–2)
- Thor: Tales of Asgard – Brunhilde, Additional Voices
- ToddWorld – Tyler
- Tom and Jerry Tales – Thomasina
- Troll Tales – Tumbler
- Ultimate Book of Spells – Vern, Borgia
- What About Mimi? – Additional Voices
- X-Men: Evolution – Dr. Eaton
- Yvon of the Yukon – Miss Anthrope, Additional Voices

=== Live-action ===
- The Halfback of Notre Dame – Mrs. Modeau
- I'll Be Home for Christmas – Wendy Richards
- M.A.N.T.I.S. – TV Interviewer (episode: "First Steps"), Cindy Logan (episode: "Cease Fire")
- The Outer Limits – Simon (voice) (episode: "Simon Says")
- Resurrection – Hospital P.R. Woman (TV film)
- Stargate SG-1 – Resident #2 (episode: "The Gamekeeper")
- You, Me and the Kids – Bank's Assistant (episode: "Cents & Sensibility")

=== Video games ===
- Devil Kings – Hornet
- Kessen – Okatsu
- Mobile Suit Gundam: Encounters in Space – Mirai Yashima
- Mobile Suit Gundam: Gundam vs. Zeta Gundam – Mirai Yashima
- Mobile Suit Gundam: Journey to Jaburo – Mirai Yashima
- My Little Pony – Spike
- Victor Vector and Yondo the Dog in The Cyberplasm Formula – Various
- "Minecraft Mini Series: Challenge of The Spooky Isles" – Slugger
- Rudolph the Red-Nosed Reindeer's Magical Sleigh Ride – Rudolph
