= List of Kate & Mim-Mim episodes =

Kate & Mim-Mim is an animated children's television series created by husband-and-wife duo, Scott and Julie Stewart. Nerd Corps Entertainment in the first season and DHX Studios and FremantleMedia Kids & Family in the second season produce the series, which is presented by Knowledge Kids and BBC Kids, and aired from on 4 August 2014 to 23 March 2018 in Canada. Also, CBeebies premiered on 30 October 2016 in the United Kingdom. The series premiered on Disney Jr. in the United States on 19 December 2014 until 2 July 2017 when Disney Jr. lost the rights to air the series.

The series focuses on the friendship and adventures of a little girl named Kate and her favourite toy, a plush bunny named Mim-Mim who go on daring adventures in the fictional world of Mimiloo.

== Series overview ==
| Season | Segments | Episodes | Originally released | | |
| Season | Segments | Episodes | First released | Last released | Network |
|---|---|---|---|---|---|
| 1 | 51 | 26 | 1 September 2014 4 August 2014 | 12 May 2015 6 April 2015 | UK: CBeebies Canada: Knowledge Network and BBC Kids |
| 2 | 45 | 23 | 18 April 2016 21 December 2015 | 23 March 2018 13 September 2017 | UK: CBeebies Canada: Knowledge Network and BBC Kids |

== Episodes ==
=== Season 1 (2014–15) ===
| No. overall | No. in season | Title | Directed by | Written by | UK airdate (top) North American airdate (bottom) | Prod. code |
|---|---|---|---|---|---|---|
| 1 | 1 | "Rip Roaring Race" | Daniel DeSerranno, Scott Stewart, James Corrigall | Dave Dias, Julie and Scott Stewart | 1 September 2014 (Note: This episode was first released in Funny Bunny Friend DVD on 23 March 2015.) 4 August 2014 | 103A |
Kate learns about helping Dad to race the cars. In Mimiloo, tree frog Tack, who coaches then teaches his Mimiloo friends, races their own cars during the race track liners to get to the finish line.
| 2 | 2 | "The Need for Seed" | Daniel DeSerranno, Scott Stewart, James Corrigall | Alice Prodanou, Julie and Scott Stewart | 2 September 2014 5 August 2014 | 103B |
Mim-Mim believes to put the seed in a hole right here in Gobble's garden. The friends chase a really fast plant, which sprouts in a surprising manner, but Kate wonders how to get back from his garden.
| 3 | 3 | "Colour Me Happy" | Dustin Mckenzie, Scott Stewart, James Corrigall | Sheila Rogerson, Julie and Scott Stewart | 3 September 2014 11 August 2014 | 104A |
Tack creates an invention about his favorite colours from Crayon Cliffs. However, Mimiloo world turns grey and loses colour quality in the process―Tack feels glum, Mim-Mim saves the colourful machine before Tack demands all their colour back.
| 4 | 4 | "Kittens and Mittens" | Dustin Mckenzie, Scott Stewart, James Corrigall | Diana Moore, Julie and Scott Stewart | 4 September 2014 12 August 2014 | 104B |
Kate looks for a box of mittens, she tracks down her flurry of Mitten kittens that have overtaken Lily and Boomer's house. Kate has clever spots to put on mittens, which Mim-Mim's friends feel cute, they belong to Winter Waterfalls.
| 5 | 5 | "Tail Tale" | Clint Butler, Scott Stewart, James Corrigall | Shawn Kalb, Julie and Scott Stewart | 5 September 2014 13 August 2014 | 105A |
Kate is playing with Mim-Mim when she realizes that her lost tail has come off. In the middle of an ocean near Mimiloo, Mim-Mim feels tailless decide to be friends anymore in Mimiloo and agreed with his tail on a back of course, to pay special attention caught with his tail back.
| 6 | 6 | "Mirror Mirror" | Clint Butler and Scott Stewart | Sheila Rogerson, Julie and Scott Stewart | 8 September 2014 14 August 2014 | 105B |
In the backyard, the family are having a picnic and accidentally got eaten by the muffin. In Mimiloo, much to his confusion, Tack and Gobble decide not to be friends anymore, causing mirror to split mirror into Mim-Mims part of his accidentally breaking some other things. Despite that, the other's things are a mystery, including Kate figures breaking outside the mirror.
| 7 | 7 | "Boomer Size" | Sebastian Brodin, Scott Stewart, James Corrigall | Diana Moore, Julie and Scott Stewart | 9 September 2014 18 August 2014 | 106A |
Boomer is bigger, the friends are totally scared to see the original size of Boomer is made.
| 8 | 8 | "Mim-Mim's Moon Mishap" | Scott Stewart and James Corrigall | Jennifer Daley, Julie and Scott Stewart | 10 September 2014 19 August 2014 | 106B |
Kate wants to make friends with the man on the moon. In Mimiloo, Kate and Mim-Mim accidentally blast off in Tack's new rocket ship. When they land, they meet Rumbly, a little guy made of rocks–who must be the man on the moon. Kate and Mim-Mim must help him repair his house, then send all of his friends home to Mimiloo.
| 9 | 9 | "Tee Hee Rex" | Sylvain Blais and Scott Stewart | Julie Stewart and Scott Stewart | 11 September 2014 20 August 2014 | 107A |
Kate assumes that Marco can play a funny April Fools' Day joke on her. In Mimiloo, a trickster plays funny gags on Kate and her friends, leading into the spirit of silly tricks themselves. They figure out what the original Jokester is, things aren't always what they seem.
| 10 | 10 | "Mega Music Maker" | Sylvain Blais and Scott Stewart | Garner Haines, Julie and Scott Stewart | 12 September 2014 21 August 2014 | 107B |
Kate is building a sandcastle, but the wind chimes she places on top aren't working. In Mimiloo, after Mim-Mim accidentally ruins a music recording, when Kate, Mim-Mim and their friends visit the Singing Seas where Callie, a giant octopus, keeps her mega music maker. Unfortunately, the music recording is broken and Kate leads her on a quest to fix the island-sized instrument.
| 11 | 11 | "Lost Island" | Scott Stewart and James Corrigall | Sheila Rogerson, Julie and Scott Stewart | 15 September 2014 22 August 2014 | 108A |
Mim-Mim and his friends are playing on the beach, suddenly, their beach toys go missing as Lily fears that the toys are in Lost Island, guarded by Callie.
| 12 | 12 | "Flight of the Flowers" | Dustin Mckenzie and Scott Stewart | Sheila Rogerson, Julie and Scott Stewart | 16 September 2014 25 August 2014 | 108B |
Kate is riding her bike for the first time without training wheels and she keeps falling. In Mimiloo, Kate and her friends must learn to fly giant wind flowers. In order to surprise Lily at her spring-thing party, Mim-Mim has never flown a flower. Later, he thinks Kate must gain his confidence to become a fully-fledged flower pilot.
| 13 | 13 | "A Case of the Giggles" | Sebastian Brodin, Mike Fetterly, Scott Stewart | J.D. Smith, Julie and Scott Stewart | 17 September 2014 6 August 2014 | 102A |
When Marco (Kate's dad) catches a cold and she wants to help him to get better. In Mimiloo, Mim-Mim and his friends Gobble and Tack, who caught a bug, are trying to research the case of the giggly mystery Merry-Berry-Bush berries, especially Boomer.
| 14 | 14 | "Hiccups and Night Fun" | Sebastian Brodin, Mike Fetterly, Scott Stewart | Jennifer Daley, J.D. Smith, Julie and Scott Stewart | 18 September 2014 7 August 2014 | 102B |
A family set camp in the backyard and she feels nervous. On the night of Mimiloo, she and Mim-Mim find Boomer with a case of the hiccups too much. Until they journey to Happy Hollow–a place which is full of Boogideebears, this time Boomer is working until the hiccups are gone.
| 15 | 15 | "Cloud Castle" | Clint Butler and Scott Stewart | Julie and Scott Stewart | 19 September 2014 26 August 2014 | 109A |
Mim-Mim becomes royal and makes the clouds wander up into the sky and is shaped like a castle. Due to his castle flying away, much to Mim-Mim's horror. It is possible that the castle but how to get it down and get it up and float away safely. The friends are escaping the sky, who lose weight in the cloud castle.
| 16 | 16 | "Snow Bowling" | Scott Stewart | Ashley Lannigan, Julie and Scott Stewart | 22 September 2014 27 August 2014 | 109B |
In the Winter Waterfalls, Kate and her friends go snow bowling, she realizes there is enough snow to make a snow fort while using snowballs, bowling balls, and snowmen pinballs with her friends.
| 17 | 17 | "Valentine Friends" | Scott Stewart | Sheila Rogerson, Julie and Scott Stewart | 23 September 2014 28 August 2014 | 110A |
Kate's friends are making up for Valentine's Day.
| 18 | 18 | "A Storybook Ending" | Scott Stewart | Jennifer Daley, Julie and Scott Stewart | 24 September 2014 29 August 2014 | 110B |
Kate and Mim-Mim helps his lost favourite book.
| 19 | 19 | "Balloon Buddies" | Clint Butler and Scott Stewart | Dave Dias, Julie and Scott Stewart | 25 September 2014 4 August 2014 | 101A |
Kate is making a balloon for Mim-Mim. In Mimiloo, both meet their friends and investigate a balloon, which is going too far and accidentally all flat and droopy, but Kate must inflate balloons before the Big Balloon Parade begins. They join the Big Balloon Parade, Kate and her friends are having a big surprise by saving their balloons. At home, she passes to Mim-Mim before Mom and Dad get a test for flying and inflating balloons.
| 20 | 20 | "Twinkle Twinkle" | Clint Butler and Scott Stewart | J.D. Smith, Julie and Scott Stewart | 26 September 2014 5 August 2014 | 101B |
On a night of shooting stars, Kate wonders what the stars are like. In Mimiloo, Kate's friends find a lost falling star headed towards the Forever Forest. Mim-Mim names the star Twinkly, his friends along the way to help him go back to his home in the sky.
| 21 | 21 | "Snifferific" | Mike Fetterly and Scott Stewart | Shelley Hoffman, Robert Pincombe, Julie Stewart | 29 September 2014 1 September 2014 | 111A |
Lily hosts a snifferific contest to see who has the best smelling item, but Boomer sends a stinky yuckabush while Tack comes to fix the stinky cloud solution.
| 22 | 22 | "Summer Funday Drive" | Mike Fetterly and Scott Stewart | Julie and Scott Stewart | 30 September 2014 2 September 2014 | 111B |
Kate and her friends are going on a road trip to see the beach sand dunes and go surfing.
| 23 | 23 | "Mega Mim" | Scott Stewart | Julie and Scott Stewart | 1 October 2014 3 September 2014 | 112A |
Kate has a surprise to build a new giant robotic Mega Mim.
| 24 | 24 | "Kate the Great" | Scott Stewart | Sheila Rogerson, Julie and Scott Stewart | 2 October 2014 4 September 2014 | 112B |
While performing a magic act with her assistant Mim-Mim, Kate the Great attempts to make reversing spells and make Boomer disappear.
| 25 | 25 | "Clean Sweep" | Scott Stewart | Shelley Hoffman, Robert Pincombe, Julie Stewart | 3 October 2014 5 September 2014 | 113A |
The gang goes to a picnic, yet the picnic basket gets lost in a messy sea of Tack's inventions while Kate cleans up until the picnic is cancelled. In the meantime, the shed is making a huge mess.
| 26 | 26 | "Princess Kate" | Mike Fetterly and Scott Stewart | Dave Dias, Julie and Scott Stewart | 17 November 2014 15 July 2015 | 113B |
The Bunniflies make Kate their princess through Far-Off Woods, making his friends left behind and feel jealousy.
| 27 | 27 | "Lighter than Air" | Sebastian Brodin and Scott Stewart | Robert Ardiel, Julie and Scott Stewart | 18 November 2014 22 July 2015 | 114A |
Mim-Mim accidentally squashes one of Gobble's pumpkins which makes him think that he is using lighter than air like a balloon through Tack's inventions will help.
| 28 | 28 | "Gobble's Gift" | Sebastian Brodin and Scott Stewart | John Mein, Julie and Scott Stewart | 19 November 2014 29 September 2014 | 114B |
The gang preparing for a dance party and nothing to Kate's fear, the crystals cause the gang to be trapped and go awry.
| 29 30 | 29 30 | "A Christmas Wish" | Clint Butler and Scott Stewart | J.D. Smith, Julie and Scott Stewart | 22 December 2014 19 December 2014 | 115 |
Kate is excited for Christmas and wonders to wait for presents to come out. In Mimiloo, she imagines that Mim-Mim (as Santa Claus) is a delightful wish to get ready for Christmas before Santa comes, he wonders to reach the star before catching it. Kate builds his sled for Mim-Mim, after she carries and flies away while the reindeers takes off by packing and delivering presents on the back side. When the blizzard attacks, the gang feel sad it doesn't ruin Christmas, before Kate and Mim-Mim are caught up on a sled before crash landing next to the Christmas tree. They start to go wrong and not supposed to happen, everyone groans and misses Christmas time. They are excited to fix the tree before Santa comes, he interviews "a merry Christmas Wish" in front of their gang. Back home, Kate plans to switch ideas before she shares opening presents with her parents. Note : This is the first 26-minute episode special of this season.
| 31 | 31 | "Babysitting Squoosh" | Steve Ball and Scott Stewart | Naomi Jardine, Julie and Scott Stewart | 5 January 2015 29 July 2015 | 116A |
Kate knows why the birds are not visiting the birdhouse. They found themselves in Mimiloo, they asked to look after Baby Squoosh while his mother built his nest.
| 32 | 32 | "Chilly the Snowman" | Scott Stewart | Sheila Rogerson, Julie and Scott Stewart | 6 January 2015 2 October 2015 | 116B |
Kate is upset because her snowman is melting. In Mimiloo, the two travel to Winter Waterfalls and find Chilly the Snowman before it helps him to keep cool down.
| 33 | 33 | "The Curious Case of the Chamelippo" | Rich Johnson and Scott Stewart | Julie and Scott Stewart, John Van Bruggen | 7 January 2015 25 November 2014 | 117A |
Kate notices that a missing cookie from her plate, she investigates to solve a mystery. In Mimiloo, Kate and Mim-Mim investigates a strange phenomenon where the colourful items are disappearing.
| 34 | 34 | "Bubble Subble" | Rich Johnson and Scott Stewart | Julie and Scott Stewart, John Van Bruggen | 8 January 2015 10 October 2014 | 117B |
Kate's night light isn't working and she's afraid to sleep in the dark. In Mimiloo, Kate and her friends go exploring in the furthest depths of the Singing Seas, Mim-Mim is afraid of the dark waters and the scary creatures that must live underwater, his friends will keep it safe.
| 35 | 35 | "Kate's Dragon Quest" | Scott Stewart | Sheila Rogerson, Julie and Scott Stewart | 9 January 2015 6 October 2014 | 118A |
They encounter a lost dragon who becomes Kate's heroism and brings the dragon back home.
| 36 | 36 | "Butterfly Flowers" | Sebastian Brodin and Scott Stewart | Karen Moonah, Julie and Scott Stewart | 12 January 2015 7 October 2014 | 118B |
Tack decides to build a lighthouse when he and his friends hear of the special animal plants that fly at night.
| 37 | 37 | "Kate's Turtle Drive" | Clint Butler and Scott Stewart | Diana Moore, Julie and Scott Stewart | 13 January 2015 8 October 2014 | 119A |
Mimiloo friends are travelled to the Singing Seas while Lily finds a nest for hatching humming turtle eggs.
| 38 | 38 | "Make Up a Game Day" | Clint Butler and Scott Stewart | Jennifer Daley, Julie and Scott Stewart | 14 January 2015 9 October 2014 | 119B |
In Make Up a Game Day, she prompts her friends to combine elements of their favourite games and create a new one, while Mim-Mim gets a trophy for the winner.
| 39 | 39 | "Lily's Café" | Steve Ball and Scott Stewart | Patrick Granleese, Julie and Scott Stewart | 15 January 2015 10 October 2014 | 120A |
While having a lemonade stand, Kate accidentally spills her lemonade glass. In Mimiloo, Lily makes a special tomato and cucumber soup and gets a secret with the bunniflies that Queen Glowla is planning a royal visit and creates to share his own food.
| 40 | 40 | "Leapfrog Underfrog" | Steve Ball and Scott Stewart | Dave Dias, Julie and Scott Stewart | 16 January 2015 13 October 2014 | 120B |
Kate tries and misses at pin the tail on the donkey. In the game of Hoppy Sacks game in Mimiloo, he tries to do the leapfrog race and fellow new friend, Auggie the Froggie.
| 41 | 41 | "The Big Idea Box" | Rich Johnson and Scott Stewart | Robert Ardiel, Julie and Scott Stewart | 19 January 2015 15 March 2015 | 121A |
Marco gets a ukulele in a big box and Kate thinks of a secret. In Mimiloo, Tack believes that his broken unthinking "thinker" (his brain), so his friends try to help and fix him.
| 42 | 42 | "Happy Mim Day" | Rich Johnson and Scott Stewart | Diana Moore, Julie Stewart, Scott Stewart | 20 January 2015 26 January 2015 | 121B |
Kate will throw a surprise birthday party for Mim-Mim.
| 43 | 43 | "Super Kate" | Sebastian Brodin, Scott Stewart, James Corrigall | Sheila Rogerson, Julie and Scott Stewart | 21 January 2015 17 March 2015 | 122A |
Kate playing with her father in the yard, she accidentally tosses a ball sock in a high tree and can't reach it. In Mimiloo, both find Boomer with super-speed as they find out that Tack creates a gadget that gives superpowers. Later on, Boomer gets trapped with his speed strength as he thinks for everyone's too powerful.
| 44 | 44 | "Boom Chicka Bees" | Sebastian Brodin and Scott Stewart | Diana Moore, Julie and Scott Stewart | 22 January 2015 18 March 2015 | 122B |
Kate challenges his time and she goes awry to jump rope. In Mimiloo, Gobble investigates and leads his friends to make music for the bees.
| 45 | 45 | "The Mimiloo Zoo" | Clint Butler and Scott Stewart | Julie and Scott Stewart, John Van Bruggen | 23 January 2015 19 March 2015 | 123A |
Kate and her Mom prepare their plans to go to the zoo before the rainstorm comes. In Mimiloo, Kate and Mim-Mim find themselves in a giant hedge maze as he thinks and are curious about the wild animals hedge cover, until Tack creates a potion that it shrinks hedge animals into size and brings them back to life.
| 46 | 46 | "A Bunch o'Boomers" | Clint Butler and Scott Stewart | Julie and Scott Stewart, John Van Bruggen | 4 May 2015 20 March 2015 | 123B |
One day, Kate and Mim-Mim will meet Gobble appears with a special flower, shimmer flower, that blooms every once a year as Lily plans to find a unicorn. When they know that unicorns eat shimmer flowers in order to fly until Tack's super-sniffer robot dog keeps scaring him.
| 47 | 47 | "Lily and the Unicorn" | Steve Ball and Scott Stewart | Julie and Scott Stewart | 5 May 2015 6 January 2015 | 124A |
Kate finds fireflies and it keeps flying away. In Mimiloo, a rambunctious robot dog named Sniffer Finder and Lily likes his favourite animal: a unicorn.
| 48 | 48 | "Small Wonders" | Scott Stewart | Sheila Rogerson, Julie and Scott Stewart | 6 May 2015 9 March 2015 | 124B |
Kate is having trouble lifting heavy plants in pots. In Mimiloo, Tack was planning on adding special flowers, shrinking violets, in Gobble's garden. Kate and Mim-Mim could end up being shrunk by the violets, they encounter an ant named Tiny who needs help later on Tack and Gobble shrink as well until they encounter a giant beetle.
| 49 | 49 | "Mim-Mim's Teenie Genie" | Rich Johnson and Scott Stewart | Julie and Scott Stewart | 7 May 2015 16 March 2015 | 125A |
Kate is making faces in a mirror, she notices the blue eyes of her Mom until Kate thinks her brown eyes aren't as beautiful as her. In Mimiloo, Mim-Mim being clumsy as he finds a gold-coloured lamp encounters a tiny genie by getting stuck in his lamp. He gives Mim-Mim wishes to help him until he learns that sometimes the biggest changes can lead to his problems.
| 50 | 50 | "To Catch a Critter" | Rich Johnson and Scott Stewart | Julie and Scott Stewart, John Van Bruggen | 8 May 2015 23 March 2015 | 125B |
Kate captures a grasshopper until he hops and gets in a jar. In Mimiloo, both try to help Lily to capture some amazing Mimiloo critters.
| 51 | 51 | "Follow the Leader" | Sebastian Brodin and Scott Stewart | J.D. Smith, Julie and Scott Stewart | 11 May 2015 25 March 2015 | 126A |
In Mimiloo, Kate and Mim-Mim find a Mimiloo lemming named Lemilou, who needed help with her lemming friends when their protective homes ended up in the middle of a lake. As the lemmings make Mim-Mim their leader and the others try to find a way to help to get rid of lemmings.
| 52 | 52 | "Treasure of Tut-n-Bunny" | Sebastian Brodin and Scott Stewart | Robert Ardiel, Julie and Scott Stewart | 12 May 2015 6 April 2015 | 126B |
Kate receives a puzzle box for her father, but she has trouble solving it. In Mimiloo, on a hot summer day, Mim-Mim finds a bunny-shaped ring that somehow controls Mim-Mim's body. He takes the gang to an Egyptian desert where they find a bunny-headed Sphinx. Tack learns that there is a reward by conquering a few challenges as Mim-Mim and his gang magically transform into Mimilooians (Egyptian style) to enter the Sphinx.

=== Season 2 (2015–18) ===
The second season started on 21 December 2015.

| No. overall | No. in season | Title | Directed by | Written by | UK airdate (top) North American airdate (bottom) | Prod. code |
|---|---|---|---|---|---|---|
| 53 | 1 | "Bathtime for Boomer" | Daniel DeSerranno and Scott Stewart | Julie and Scott Stewart | 18 April 2016 27 February 2017 | 201A |
Boomer gets dirty before he takes a bath―soon he realizes Boomer pretends to be a pirate captain in the bathtub, nothing to come out "aarggh".
| 54 | 2 | "The Mimiloo Express" | Daniel DeSerranno and Scott Stewart | Julie and Scott Stewart | 19 April 2016 28 February 2017 | 201B |
Mim-Mim and his gang hop along the train to ride on a rail and never complete stop.
| 55 | 3 | "Jurassic Tee Hees" | Ben Anderson and Scott Stewart | Julie and Scott Stewart | 20 April 2016 1 March 2017 | 202A |
Kate and Mim-Mim and his friends find themselves in a dinosaur-like theme mayhem, by causing chaos and mischief.
| 56 | 4 | "Tack and the Beanstalk" | Ben Anderson and Scott Stewart | Julie and Scott Stewart | 21 April 2016 2 March 2017 | 202B |
Tack uses his large barge to make his boom bean into huge-sized and turns it into a huge beanstalk, taking Lily into the sky and her friends have to rescue her.
| 57 | 5 | "Mim-Mim's Eggscellent Easter" | Daniel DeSerranno and Scott Stewart | J.D. Smith, Julie and Scott Stewart | 22 April 2016 7 March 2017 | 204A |
Mim-Mim and his friends are going to be an eggs-cellent creation.
| 58 | 6 | "Lily's Ballet Recital" | Daniel DeSerranno and Scott Stewart | J.D. Smith, Julie and Scott Stewart | 25 April 2016 8 March 2017 | 204B |
Lily dressed up ballet for the dance, because she is not afraid the other dance recital.
| 59 | 7 | "Eggy Boomer" | Rich Johnson and Scott Stewart | Julie and Scott Stewart | 26 April 2016 3 March 2017 | 203A |
During events of "Mim-Mim's Eggscellent Easter", Easter's day for the rest of Boomer finds an Easter egg, before he is listening to anyone having a scavenger hunt avoiding putting into his basket.
| 60 | 8 | "Chariots of Fun" | Rich Johnson and Scott Stewart | Julie and Scott Stewart, John Van Bruggen | 27 April 2016 6 March 2017 | 203B |
In self-centred Mimiloo, both discovered the chariot costume wearing to pretend and how to ride in a chariot race then keeps trying. Likely Lily, she considered going inside and being followed by the pyramids in Ancient Egypt.
| 61 | 9 | "Boomer's Blanky" | Ben Anderson and Scott Stewart | J.D. Smith, Julie and Scott Stewart | 28 April 2016 9 March 2017 | 205A |
Boomer loses his favourite blanky then he finds it.
| 62 | 10 | "Boogedie Bear Hair" | Ben Anderson and Scott Stewart | J.D. Smith, Julie and Scott Stewart | 29 April 2016 10 March 2017 | 205B |
Gobble's long hair grown causes into Boogedie Bear Hair, must be mistaking them.
| 63 | 11 | "Mimiloo Clubhouse" | Gino Nichele and Scott Stewart | Sheila Rogerson, J.D. Smith, Julie and Scott Stewart | 2 May 2016 13 March 2017 | 206A |
Kate and her friends are celebrating Mimiloo Day by building a new clubhouse.
| 64 | 12 | "The Fluff Between Your Eyes" | Gino Nichele and Scott Stewart | J.D. Smith, Julie and Scott Stewart | 3 May 2016 14 March 2017 | 206B |
Tack asks Mim-Mim's help to fix the important tool for his ears with inventions.
| 65 | 13 | "Lights, Camera, Mim-Mim!" | Scott Stewart | Sheila Rogerson, J.D. Smith, Julie and Scott Stewart | 4 May 2016 15 March 2017 | 208A |
Mim-Mim's friends are making a movie that is something exciting here at the movie recital studio in Mimiloo.
| 66 | 14 | "The Sky is Falling" | Scott Stewart | Robert Ardiel, J.D. Smith, Julie and Scott Stewart | 5 May 2016 16 March 2017 | 208B |
Tack looks at the sky, starting to fail and going missing in the sky. To take cover with Mim-Mim, Kate, and his friends feeling stressed out and the sky pieces are lost.
| 67 | 15 | "Friendship Day" | Steve Ball and Scott Stewart | Julie and Scott Stewart | 6 May 2016 17 March 2017 | 209A |
They will choose best friends and challenge delivering gifts on Friendship Day with their gang.
| 68 | 16 | "Octo-Mim" | Steve Ball and Scott Stewart | Julie and Scott Stewart | 9 May 2016 20 March 2017 | 209B |
Mim-Mim pretends to be Octo-Mim, where he sets in the ocean.
| 69 | 17 | "Small Blunders" | Gino Nichele and Scott Stewart | Shelley Hoffman, Robert Pincombe, Julie and Scott Stewart | 10 May 2016 21 March 2017 | 210A |
The two investigates the shrinking violets in Mimiloo's garden.
| 70 | 18 | "Lunar or Later" | Gino Nichele and Scott Stewart | Julie and Scott Stewart | 11 May 2016 28 March 2017 | 210B |
Kate will eclipse the moon appears soon after the moon disappears.
| 71 | 19 | "Sprite Lights" | Rich Johnson and Scott Stewart | Kendra Hibbert, Julie and Scott Stewart | 12 May 2016 23 March 2017 | 211A |
They must help lose water sprites before getting closer to the Singing Seas.
| 72 | 20 | "Wild Boomer" | Rich Johnson and Scott Stewart | Julie and Scott Stewart | 13 May 2016 24 March 2017 | 211B |
Boomer plays camouflage to hide in those bushes, making everyone into the wild and scary.
| 73 | 21 | "Grabby the Crab" | Clint Butler and Scott Stewart | Robert Ardiel, Julie and Scott Stewart | 16 May 2016 27 March 2017 | 212A |
Kate needs help for Mim-Mim by getting the fish and navigating to Grabby the Crab.
| 74 | 22 | "Secret Superhero" | Clint Butler and Scott Stewart | Shelley Hoffman, Robert Pincombe, Julie and Scott Stewart | 17 May 2016 22 March 2017 | 212B |
Kate is entranced with her superhero abilities to rescue hidden gadgets.
| 75 | 23 | "Boomer's New Pet" | Steve Ball and Scott Stewart | Robert Ardiel, Julie and Scott Stewart | 18 May 2016 29 March 2017 | 213A |
Boomer makes a new critter before it's getting away with a hard-shelled fast speed.
| 76 | 24 | "Gobble's Gizmos and Gadgets" | Steve Ball and Scott Stewart | Julie and Scott Stewart, John Van Bruggen | 19 May 2016 30 March 2017 | 213B |
Gobble loses his touch as a gardener. With the help of Tack, he investigates a missing plant back to Gobble's garden to use sunshine.
| 77 | 25 | "Little Kate Riding Hood" | Scott Stewart | Julie and Scott Stewart | 20 May 2016 31 March 2017 | 214A |
Kate knows an idea to make a story work.
| 78 | 26 | "Glowing Up" | Scott Stewart | Julie and Scott Stewart | 23 May 2016 3 April 2017 | 214B |
Boomer sings about the star song flower and other parts aren't wilting at night.
| 79 | 27 | "Lil' Boo" | Scott Stewart | Julie and Scott Stewart | 24 May 2016 4 April 2017 | 216B |
The Mimiloo gang prepares to dress like a costume party, who attempts to scare Boomer (dressed as a ghost) with some stage freight.
| 80 | 28 | "Boomer's Three Wishes" | Scott Stewart | Julie and Scott Stewart | 25 May 2016 5 April 2017 | 216A |
Boomer finds the Teeny Genie's magic lamp; however, Kate and Mim-Mim get trapped inside the lamp and transport them back.
| 81 | 29 | "Me and My Shadow" | Scott Stewart | Julie and Scott Stewart | 26 May 2016 6 April 2017 | 215A |
Tack's invention can bring shade to Mim-Mim, but he is afraid and has nightmares in front of him.
| 82 | 30 | "Twirly Scouts" | Scott Stewart | Shelley Hoffman, Robert Pincombe, Julie and Scott Stewart | 27 May 2016 7 April 2017 | 215B |
Kate and the Mimiloo gang go hiking with their friends, which pays off to separate the group and look for trail markers.
| 83 | 31 | "Remember When?" | Scott Stewart | Julie and Scott Stewart | 5 June 2017 10 April 2017 | 217A |
Due to mishap for Tack's inventions, Kate leads his sights and gives the special memories for him.
| 84 | 32 | "The Mimiloo Mystery Friend" | Scott Stewart | Shelley Hoffman, Robert Pincombe, Julie and Scott Stewart | 6 June 2017 28 August 2017 | 217B |
Detectives Kate and Mim-Mim investigate a mystery friend who leads some missing stuff.
| 85 | 33 | "King Boomer" | Scott Stewart | Julie and Scott Stewart | 7 June 2017 29 August 2017 | 218A |
Boomer is feeling frustrating because he's too little to help and work some harvesting Gobble's garden before he's crowned by tiny mole miners.
| 86 | 34 | "So You Think You Can Trumpet?" | Scott Stewart | Julie and Scott Stewart | 8 June 2017 30 August 2017 | 218B |
They go to the Mimiloo Talent Show to perform and give Boomer a hint about how Gobble can judge a trumpet sound.
| 87 88 | 35 36 | "Kate in Oz" | Scott Stewart | Julie and Scott Stewart | 9 June 2017 12 April 2017 | 207 |
In the real world, Kate and his parents are reading a book before bedtime starts. In Mimiloo, Kate and Mim-Mim's friends are dressed like The Wizard of Oz-style. They find out what is discovered in the world of Oz, where they can do courageous and strange things. Mim-Mim brought Dorothy's Kate without wearing his fun day ever. Note 1 : This is the second 26-minute special episode of this season. Note 2 : This is the parody of the same name as The Wizard of Oz.
| 89 | 37 | "The Mimiloo Safari" | Scott Stewart | Julie and Scott Stewart | 12 March 2018 31 August 2017 | 219A |
They went to the Mimiloo Zoo and searched for Binky the monkey to get back home safely.
| 90 | 38 | "Baby Gobble" | Scott Stewart | Julie and Scott Stewart | 13 March 2018 1 September 2017 | 219B |
While Gobble accidentally turns into a baby, the gang needs Big Gobble back to save their whirly-fig harvest belonging to the hungry cute-a-pillar.
| 91 | 39 | "Lucky Funny Bunny" | Scott Stewart | Julie and Scott Stewart | 14 March 2018 4 September 2017 | 220A |
He accidentally fixes one of luck inventing, soon becomes Tack's Lucky Funny Bunny Charm before running out.
| 92 | 40 | "Mim-Mim on Ice" | Scott Stewart | Julie and Scott Stewart | 15 March 2018 5 September 2017 | 220B |
The Mimiloo gang are playing hockey games with penguins.
| 93 | 41 | "Kate's Surprise" | Scott Stewart | Julie and Scott Stewart | 16 March 2018 6 September 2017 | 221A |
Mim-Mim tasked Kate to keep a secret and give her a surprise.
| 94 | 42 | "Fun for Zoom Zoom" | Scott Stewart | Julie and Scott Stewart | 19 March 2018 7 September 2017 | 221B |
Boomer's pet Zoom Zoom really wants to have fun with them.
| 95 | 43 | "Boomer's First Flight" | Scott Stewart | Julie and Scott Stewart | 20 March 2018 8 September 2017 | 222A |
Boomer takes a flight to a wind flower before looking out of control, when they are swept away by a whirlwind in the Gusty Windstream while saved by Boomer.
| 96 | 44 | "Tack's Obstacle Course" | Scott Stewart | Julie and Scott Stewart | 21 March 2018 11 September 2017 | 222B |
Everyone approves to be in the obstacle course, which is difficult, sometimes to lead the gang and help Tack set off the rules.
| 97 | 45 | "Boomer's Masterpiece" | Scott Stewart | Julie and Scott Stewart | 22 March 2018 12 September 2017 | 223A |
Boomer's ideas end up in disaster, but the gang are determined to discover his plans for Minimise damages.
| 98 | 46 | "The Story of Tack" | Scott Stewart | Julie and Scott Stewart | 23 March 2018 13 September 2017 | 223B |
Tack is staging the play in which he can take his favourite colours from the Inventor, and makes a process to perform the slideshow.
