= Kate & Mim-Mim =

Animated adventure children's television series

- Title card
- Genre: Adventure; Children's; Fantasy
- Created by: Scott Stewart; Julie Stewart
- Directed by: Clint Butler; Scott Stewart; Julie Stewart
- Starring: Maryke Hendrikse; Lee Tockar; Tabitha St. Germain; Brian Drummond; Matt Hill
- Theme music composer: Daniel Ingram
- Opening theme: "You and Me, Kate & Mim-Mim" by Jessica Zraly
- Ending theme: "You and Me, Kate & Mim-Mim" (instrumental)
- Composer: Michael Richard Plowman
- Countries of origin: Canada; United Kingdom
- Original language: English
- No. of seasons: 2
- No. of episodes: 47 (94 segments + 2 specials) (list of episodes)

Production
- Executive producers: Asaph Fipke; Chuck Johnson (season 1); Ken Faier; Bob Higgins; Kirsten Newlands (season 2); Scott Stewart; Julie Stewart
- Producer: Asaph Fipke
- Running time: 21 minutes (2 11–minute segments)
- Production companies: FremantleMedia Kids & Family Entertainment; Nerd Corps Entertainment (season 1); DHX Studios (season 2)

Original release
- Network: Knowledge Kids; BBC Kids; CBeebies
- Release: 1 September 2014 – 23 March 2018

Kate & Mim-Mim is an animated children's television series created by husband-and-wife duo, Scott and Julie Stewart. The series aired on Knowledge Kids on 1 September 2014 to 23 March 2018, it was produced by Nerd Corps Entertainment in the first season and later by DHX Studios in the second season with FremantleMedia Kids & Family Entertainment.

The series focuses on the friendship and adventures of a little girl named Kate and her favourite toy, a plush bunny named Mim-Mim, who go on daring adventures in the fictional world of Mimiloo.

== Characters ==
- Kate (voiced by Maryke Hendrikse in Canada and Jessica Hann in the UK) is a 5-year-old girl. She is best friends with a stuffed bunny named Mim-Mim.
- Mim-Mim (voiced by Lee Tockar in Canada and by Rob Foster in the UK) is a purple plush rabbit with a pair of aviator goggles around his head, is Kate's best friend.
- Valerie (voiced by Nicole Oliver in Canada and Joanna Ruiz in the UK) is Kate's mother.
- Marco (voiced by David Godfrey in Canada and Charlie Ryan in the UK) is Kate's father.
- Boomer (voiced by Maryke Hendrikse in Canada and Joanna Ruiz in the UK) is a blue creature and Lily's younger brother with a smaller rooster-like comb on his head with little legs and blue eyes. He loves making trouble with Tack's gadgets and sometimes like making a mess and Lily protect him.
- Lily (voiced by Tabitha St. Germain in Canada and Jess Robinson in the UK) is a pink creature and Boomer's older sister with a rooster-like comb on her head. She loves flowers and cooking as she takes care of Boomer.
- Gobble (voiced by Brian Drummond in Canada and Terence Mann in the UK) is a groundhog who loves his garden, planting seeds and sometimes helping others.
- Tack (voiced by Matt Hill in Canada and Charlie Ryan in the UK) is an orange-yellow tree frog and inventor.

== Episodes ==
Season	Segments	Episodes	Originally released		
Season	Segments	Episodes	First released	Last released	Network
1	51	26	1 September 2014 4 August 2014	12 May 2015 6 April 2015	UK: CBeebies Canada: Knowledge Network and BBC Kids
2	45	23	18 April 2016 21 December 2015	23 March 2018 13 September 2017	UK: CBeebies Canada: Knowledge Network and BBC Kids

== Distribution ==
=== Broadcast ===
Kate & Mim-Mim airs on Knowledge Network and BBC Kids in Canada on 1 September 2014. The first episode premiered on Disney Jr. in the United States on 19 December 2014 until 2 July 2017 when Disney Jr. lost the rights to air the series.

The series also premiered in the United Kingdom on CBeebies on 4 August 2014.

Other broadcasters included:

Country	Also known as	Channel	Release date
Canada	Kate & Mim-Mim Kate et Mim-Mim	Family Channel Family Jr. Télémagino	1 September 2014 5 September 2015 9 January 2017
Denmark	Kate og Mim-Mim	DR	2014
France	Kate et Mim-Mim	Tiji	2014
Germany	Kati und Mim-Mim	Super RTL	3 November 2014
Lithuania	Kate ir Mim-Mim	JimJam	2014
Portugal	Kate e Mim-Mim	Panda	2015
Singapore	Kate & Mim-Mim	Okto	2015
Spain	Kate y Mim-Mim	Clan	19 December 2014
Sweden	Kate och Mim-Mim	SVT	2015
Thailand	เคทและมิมมิม	PBS	2015
United States	Kate & Mim-Mim	Netflix Qubo	1 December 2015–1 October 2019 7 December 2020–26 February 2021

=== Home media ===
On 23 March 2015, Funny Bunny Friend was released in DVD by FremantleMedia Home Entertainment in the United Kingdom, a year prior to its TV premiere.

DVDs that can be found in North America include:

- A Christmas Wish (9 November 2015)
- Flight of the Flowers (1 May 2016)
- Balloon Buddies (24 May 2016)
- The Mimiloo Zoo (20 September 2016)
- Musical Mimiloo (21 March 2017)
- Super Kate (8 August 2017)

== Awards ==
In 2015, Kate & Mim-Mim was nominated for a Leo Award for Best Overall Sound in an Animation Program or Series (for the episode titled "Bunch o' Boomers").
