= List of League of Super Evil episodes =

The following is a list of episodes for the YTV animated series, League of Super Evil. The series is produced by Nerd Corps Entertainment in association with YTV Canada Inc. In the UK, the series aired on CBBC.

== Series overview ==
Season	Episodes	Segments	Season premiere	Season finale
1	26	52	March 7, 2009	December 18, 2009
2	13	26	September 11, 2010	December 11, 2010
3	13	26	June 2, 2012	August 25, 2012

In international airings where the segments of each episode are shown as individual episodes, a short either related or not related to the episode's story is shown and always involves one or more members of the League.

== Episodes ==
=== Season 1 (2009) ===
- Season 1 premiered on March 7, 2009, and finished on December 18, 2009. This season has 26 episodes complete with 52 segments.
- This was the only season that aired in the US on Cartoon Network.

No. overall	No. in season	Title	Canadian air date	US air date	Prod. code
1	1	"Lightning Liz/The Bank Job"	March 7, 2009	March 5, 2009	101
General Sargent's daughter, Liz, tries to stop the League from having an Evil Neighborhood Barbecue "Of Doom". / In an opportunity to get a free toaster, The League takes up the job as security guards to get a $5 deposit from the bank vault to get the toaster, but a cat-themed villain attempts to ruin their plan.
2	2	"Justice Gene/Table for Four"	March 7, 2009	March 9, 2009	102
L.O.S.E. must fight to keep the title of "most annoying neighbors on the block" by thwarting Justice Gene, a gung-ho suburban by-law wannabe officer. / L.O.S.E. plots the "mission impossible" of getting their names in the guest book at the hottest villain restaurant in town, Villaynes.
3	3	"Escape from Skullossus/10"	March 14, 2009	March 16, 2009	103
Voltar decides to borrow the Quantum Weather Generator at the local high school science fair, but comes up against Skullossus and the military. / LOSE attempts to get another free pizza from Pizza from the "10 Minutes or Less or You Get It for Free!" policy by making the delivery guy run their gauntlet once again.
4	4	"Slam Dunked/Evilest in Show"	March 28, 2009	March 23, 2009	105
After being denied entry to the neighborhood slam-dunk competition for being too short, Voltar returns in a giant Super S Atomic Shuriken Typhoon Robot to win the competition. / When Voltar finds out about a neighborhood pet contest, he's desperate to get his tiny hands on the shiny trophy, and enters Dommageddon in the competition.
5	5	"L.O.S.E. vs. Lair/Swimming with the Sharks"	April 4, 2009	March 30, 2009	106
Voltar makes Doktor Frogg upgrade their security system, so he created a home computer named LAIR-Y just to keep his new tricycle safe, But when LAIR-Y goes haywire with the house, the league tries to get back into the house and unplug him. / LOSE gets a new swimming pool. When it is taken over by neighborhood kids, Voltar schemes to steal a shark to scare them away. Unfortunately, they accidentally steal a dolphin.
6	6	"Rock-a-Bye Voltar/iDestruct"	April 18, 2009	April 6, 2009	107
The League is quickly whipped into shape when governess extraordinaire Nanny Boo Boo floats in on the west wind, and moves in to the League HQ. / Every super villain in town is camped out in line for the all new iDestruct, and L.O.S.E. is no exception.
7	7	"One Zillion/Bite at the Museum"	May 2, 2009	April 13, 2009	108
To impress the neighbor kids, Voltar boasts they have "one zillion" TV channels, but now the League has exactly one day to prove it. / The League wants to steal a dinosaur bone so they can clone a T-Rex and take over the neighborhood, but they'll have to get past their old nemesis, Justice Gene, who was forced to get a job as a security guard at the museum after L.O.S.E. had him fired.
8	8	"Full Throttle/Happy Birthday Dear Doktor"	May 9, 2009	April 20, 2009	109
When the League loses a drag race to Doom Driver, a ghostly vigilante racer who takes the rides of his victims, Voltar is insulted that he doesn't seem to want the lame V-mobile. / Doktor Frogg's birthday celebration turns into a disaster when Voltar and Red resurrect Frogg's very first childhood experiment: the extremely enthusiastic Chuckles the robotic birthday clown, a relentless party machine.
9	9	"Injustice Gene/Send in the Clones"	May 16, 2009	April 27, 2009	110
After being fired from multiple jobs (no thanks to the League) and hoping to try his hand as a villain, Justice Gene comes to live with L.O.S.E. and becomes Injustice Gene, where he helps L.O.S.E. recover an item from Glory Guy's property, as Justice Gene used to work for him. / To get out of picking up Doomageddon's radioactive messes, Dr. Frogg creates clones of the League to do the dirty work. Unfortunately, the clones are far superior versions, and instead of picking up poop, almost succeed in taking over the world.
10	10	"Ice Creamed/The Split"	March 21, 2009	May 4, 2009	104
When Voltar gets annoyed that his favorite ice cream treat always gets sold out, thanks to the neighborhood kids, he makes Doktor Frogg build a machine to make the kids pick Tofu Pops instead, but the invention works too well, and now all of Metrotown wants Tofu Pops! / When Red and Doomageddon vote that Frogg’s ideas are good than Voltar’s, Voltar leaves the league and becomes a supervillain on his own.
11	11	"School Daze/Badometer"	May 23, 2009	May 11, 2009	111
Voltar poses as a substitute teacher to get even with the kids who laughed at him after he was taunted by an electronic trivia game. / Frogg puts a badometer on Red's head to teach him to be more evil, but the device ends up causing problems for Voltar's big plan to disrupt the concert of a heavy metal star who has insulted him.
12	12	"Suzie Scouts/At the Movies"	May 30, 2009	May 18, 2009	112
An absent-minded Voltar unknowingly refuses to buy cookies from a sweet little Suzie Scout who comes to the door, and no-one ever says no to the Suzie Scouts. / LOSE go to the movies on a rare day off from being evil, but Voltar proves that even on their day off, no one is as evil as they are.
13	13	"Not Accordion to Plan/The Henchbots Elites"	June 6, 2009	June 1, 2009	113
Voltar uses Red's newly-found annoying accordion skills to his advantage, but when Red is nearly catapulted to polka stardom, he is forced to choose between his art and his family. / Tired of their old, broken down Henchbots, the League decides to trade them in for new and fancy Elite Henchbots from Rotten Core in exchange, only to find that these new Henchbots require multiple, expensive upgrades.
14	14	"Mr. and Mrs. Bandango/Driver's Evil Ed"	September 5, 2009	June 2, 2009	114
Voltar's plan to fool the town with fake footage of Frogg dressed as a Bandango (a mythical Bigfooot-like creature) is foiled when Frogg is kidnapped by an actual Bandango! / A minor traffic infraction results in the V-Mobile getting impounded, so LOSE is now forced to get their Villain Team Drivers License to get it back.
15	15	"The Night Before Chaos-mas/Counting on Victory"	December 18, 2009	June 4, 2009	115
LOSE run afoul of Kinder Kreep (an evil Christmas elf/supervillain version of Santa Claus) when Voltar attempts to impersonate the imp on Chaos-mess (the villain community's version of Christmas). / Voltar is determined to win a "mystery prize" at the Mall-o-Mart by guessing the correct number of gumballs in a giant gumball dispenser.
16	16	"Fortune's Fools/World Wreckers"	September 12, 2009	June 4, 2009	116
No matter how many orders of Chinese food LOSE has delivered to the lair, Voltar gets the same lame fortune every time - "banana." / Voltar is determined to get himself listed in the "Genius Book of World Wreckers" a villainous record book.
17	17	"Lose Tooth/Underwhere?"	October 3, 2009	June 8, 2009	117
When Doomageddon has a bad tooth, the vet won't go near him, so it is up to LOSE to play dentist to get his tooth out. / Voltar's lucky underwear has gone missing, and the hunt leads him and the League deep underground to Voltar's old rival with a sinister plan.
18	18	"Lose Junior/The League of Super Hockey"	October 10, 2009	June 9, 2009	118
Red is secretly mentoring a "Cool Buddy" in an after-school program, but when Voltar finds out, he decides to take the little guy under LOSE's wing and teach him the ways of evil. / To own control of the street outside the lair, LOSE challenges the neighbor kids to a street hockey game. After a crushing defeat, Voltar decides to go double or nothing. This time, he brings in some ringers: Skullossus, Rock Gothlington, Doom Driver, and Commander Chaos. This leads to the neighborhood kids enlisting the help of General Sargent, Liz Sargent, Glory Guy, Suzie Scout Master Sweets, and the Force Fighters V.
19	19	"Evil Never Sleeps/Glory Hog"	October 24, 2009	February 7, 2010	121
Frogg's anti-sleep ray works marvels during an all-night movie marathon, so Voltar decides to use it every night. / LOSE's needing of a rival ends up with more than they bargained for when superhero Captain Glory decides that their annoying antics and pranks must be stopped.
20	20	"Past Due/Degrees of Evil"	October 17, 2009	February 7, 2010	120
Due to a lab accident, Voltar and Red think that Doktor Frogg is actually dead and a ghost, so they attempt to get Voltar's books back to the library, where a real ghost haunts it. / When Red gets a diploma in the mail, The League orders many diplomas and General Sargent need them to take care of a Giant Guinea Pig situation.
21	21	"20,000 Crunches Under the Sea/Hair Today, Gone Tomorrow"	November 28, 2009	February 7, 2010	126
When one of Doktor Frogg's inventions makes the whole town flood, the league wreaks havoc on the town, until a military dolphin tries to destroy them. / Red has been collecting a closet full of hair for years for a fairy called The Hair Fairy who brings riches, much to the dismay of Doktor Frogg (who is allergic to hair).
22	22	"Vollosus/No Good Deed..."	November 7, 2009	February 7, 2010	122
Due to an accident at the dry cleaners, Voltar takes over Skullosus' exo-suit, but when he accidentally pees in it, The suit goes haywire and reeks havoc on Metrotown. / After accidentally "saving" a pet bunny, LOSE is accused of being good samaritans, Much to the dismay of Voltar.
23	23	"Franken-Blecch/Room For Four"	September 19, 2009	October 27, 2010	119
When Doomageddon is in no mood to help Voltar with his plan, Doktor Frogg cooks up a Franken-playmate in the hope of cheering him up. / A bubble bath mishap has LOSE in need of a new place to stay, so they check themselves in to the Metrotown Hotel, where their old arch-nemesis is working at.
24	24	"Red Menacing/Dr. Strong Frogg"	November 14, 2009	October 28, 2010	123
It is Henchman Appreciation Day, and that means Red Menace is in charge, until a super secret military weapon falls into the hands of LOSE. / Frogg has finally had enough of being the weak link on the team, so he creates a machine that turns his extra brains into brawn, but his IQ takes a nosedive.
25	25	"Party Pooper/A Lose/Lose Situation"	November 21, 2009	October 29, 2010	124
When Voltar is the only one on the team not invited to a neighbourhood party, He attempts to crash the party and ruin it for everyone. / The eerily similar Legion of Supreme Evil moves in across the street, pitting Voltar and rival leader Bolkar against each other in a battle for supremacy.
26	26	"Dial 'E' for Evil/Voltar Squared"	November 21, 2009	November 1, 2010	125
Voltar's random prank calls around Metrotown has drawn the wrath of an alien warlord who travels to Earth demanding an apology. / Continuing from the last episode, Humungo plans to take over the universe by stealing the world's supply of Black Licorice Twisty Blobs, but all Voltar cares about is getting his stolen helmet back.

=== Season 2 (2010) ===
- Season 2 premiered on September 11, 2010, and finished on December 11, 2010. This season has 13 episodes with 26 segments.
- This season never aired in the US, and aired on YTV in Canada and CBBC in the United Kingdom.

No. overall	No. in season	Title	Original release date	Prod. code
27	1	"Hard Boiled/Etched in Stone"	September 11, 2010	201
Voltar sets his sights on destroying the beloved early morning meal of breakfast, but Voltar's plan to use an Invinci-ray to make eggs un-crackable backfires (literally) making Voltar completely impervious to damage. / When Voltar doodles his name in wet cement, Justice Genes track downs the mysterious wet cement defacing bandit and bring him to justice... Gene style!
28	2	"Voltina/And the Loser Is..."	September 18, 2010	202
A horrifying laundry incident has left Voltar’s outfit with a rather lovely pinkish complexion. / The city's annual super villain award show is tonight and, once again, Voltar hasn't been nominated, so Frogg, Doomageddon and Red Menace decide to secretly rig the award show, giving Voltar his first Eviley.
29	3	"All You Can Eat/Golden Claw"	September 25, 2010	203
LOSE is determined to exploit the Force Fighter V's new "all-you-can-eat" sushi policy by truly having all they can eat. / Doktor Frogg discovers a secret talent - he's incredibly good at getting toys out of novelty plush toy fetching crane games for Voltar.
30	4	"The Cookoff/My BFF Destrucktor"	October 2, 2010	204
Voltar sets his evil sights on the Burning Bum (the bum-shaped trophy) awarded to the spiciest chilli of the Metrotown Cookfair. / When Voltar's evil idol Destruktor the Destroyer moves in next door, the League of Super Evil is thrilled, but Destruktor's given up on the 'villain' thing and decided to dedicate his life to crafts and volunteering, much to Frogg and Voltar's horror.
31	5	"Journey to the Center of Evil/Canned"	October 9, 2010	205
LOSE decides to beat the winter cold and go on vacation to the hottest place in the world - the center of the Earth! / Voltar's evil plan to steal every single roll of toilet paper in the city backfires when Von Pantaloon steals his stolen stash for revenge.
32	6	"Last Villain Standing/Ant-Archy!"	October 16, 2010	206
When the city's entire supervillain population winds up behind bars, it's up to Voltar to set them free. / Voltar's latest scheme hits a snag when an army of hungry ants set their antennae on the sweet stuff.
33	7	"Vote Voltar/LOSE the Movie"	October 23, 2010	207
Voltar "borrows" the mayor's all-powerful golden sash to abolish all rules in Metrotown. / Incensed that every man, dog, hero and average Joe has their own movie, Voltar sets out to make the greatest movie about the greatest villain ever: himself.
34	8	"Doomababy/Back to the Coupons"	November 6, 2010	208
When Doomageddon gets thrown in the city's dog pound and adopted by Glory Guy's son, The League tries various ways to get their Doomhound back. / When all of the league's old coupons gets expired, Doktor Frogg builds Voltar a machine that takes him back to yesterday to get what the coupons says, but all that time traveling makes Voltar duplicates when he goes back and forth in time.
35	9	"Changemorphers/Force Fighters VI"	November 13, 2010	209
Inspired by an Infomercial, The League creates the V-Mobile into a Changemorpher, but when the Robot saw the infomercial, he thinks that the Borebots are real and wreaks havoc on Metrotown. / When the League's dino does not grow and they money for it, Voltar gets Red Menace a part-time job as a dishwasher for a sushi restaurant, but the sushi restaurant owners are actually superheroes and they want Red to be the 6th member of their group.
36	10	"U.O. Me/Mr. Wubby"	November 20, 2010	210
Voltar gets busted by Justice Gene at a concert for sugary sweet pop star sensation Prima Dana. / Voltar is unable to sleep when his sleepy-time blanket, Mister Wubby, is accidentally sold by Red at a yard sale.
37	11	"Friendship Day/Snugglebum"	November 27, 2010	211
Voltar is sickened by Friendship Day (a day where superheroes and supervillains put aside their differences and have fun) and embarks on a crusade to ruin Friendship day for everyone. / Voltar finally gets to live the life of a superstar when he discovers that he bears a striking resemblance to the kids show host Snugglebum.
38	12	"Doomhound in Love/Hot Can-Tato!"	December 4, 2010	212
When Doomageddon falls in love with Lighting Liz's poodle, Voltar and Liz try to break up with the two love-struck pets. / When Skullouss announces a contest for whoever fines a slimy gooey brownish ticket wins gets a tour of his ship, The League faces against each other for the prize.
39	13	"Steeeeve!!!/LOSE Newz"	December 11, 2010	213
An alien blob from outer space comes to earth and takes control of Voltar's archnemesis. / The league takes over the news airwaves and lie about stories that are not true, but when people do not believe them and one of their stories is actually true, they try to uncover the truth so they can trick them again.

=== Season 3 (2012) ===
- Season 3 first premiered on March 5, 2012, on CBBC in the UK and concluded on May 9, 2012. It later aired on YTV from June 2, 2012, to August 25, 2012. This season never aired in the US.
- Like the previous one, this season also has 13 episodes complete with 26 segments.

No. overall	No. in season	Title	UK air date	Canadian air date	Prod. code
40	1	"Voltopia/Kickin' Boot"	March 5, 2012	June 2, 2012	301
40	1	"Voltopia/Kickin' Boot"	March 6, 2012	June 2, 2012	301
After using one of Doktor Frogg's inventions as a bath toy, Voltar and Doktor Frogg hop in the lair's escape pod and arrive at a junkyard (which they think the world has ended), they build up two civilizations and soon, they go to war. / Tired of being short, Voltar finds very tall boots, but they are actually good boots that do good things.
41	2	"Voltar's Parade/Just Us Genes"	March 7, 2012	June 9, 2012	302
41	2	"Voltar's Parade/Just Us Genes"	March 8, 2012	June 9, 2012	302
It's time for the annual Supervillain Appreciation Parade! And this year, Voltar has his sights set on having his League of Super Evil float lead the parade. / The Legion of Glory need the League of Super Evil’s help when their arch-nemesis Justice Gene borrows the Belt of Multiplicity, which creates duplicates of himself.
42	3	"Spaaaace Bugs/Buy 2 Get None Free"	March 9, 2012	June 16, 2012	303
42	3	"Spaaaace Bugs/Buy 2 Get None Free"	March 12, 2012	June 16, 2012	303
Voltar has finally managed to claim Skullossus's space station as his own by having LOSE pose as exterminators. / After watching an advert for Rotten Core's latest useless villain gadgets, Voltar decides to start selling Frogg's useless inventions.
43	4	"Mama Menace/Change for the Worse"	March 13, 2012	June 23, 2012	304
43	4	"Mama Menace/Change for the Worse"	March 14, 2012	June 23, 2012	304
When Red gets sick with the super sneezes, his mother comes to Metrotown to take care of him. / Voltar thinks he's found a free limitless supply of change for the arcades when he discovers that people toss their unwanted coins into the Mall's wishing well.
44	5	"In Your Dreams/Trashpocalypse Now"	March 15, 2012	June 30, 2012	305
44	5	"In Your Dreams/Trashpocalypse Now"	March 16, 2012	June 30, 2012	305
After suffering another defeat by Von Pantaloon, Frogg builds a machine that will allow Voltar and the rest of LOSE to travel into Von Pantaloon's dreams to exact sweet revenge. / Voltar embarks on a quest to make the Lair as dirty as possible! But the good times end when the neighbourhood calls in the Suzie Scouts to clean up the whole lair.
45	6	"00-Geddon/Hurty Dancing"	March 19, 2012	July 7, 2012	306
45	6	"00-Geddon/Hurty Dancing"	March 20, 2012	July 7, 2012	306
Doomageddon is called into action to stop a righteous plan by the forces of good that could spell disaster for evildom. / When Voltar's one and only belt winds up being used as the Cougar's necklace, a saggy pants Voltar sets his sights on getting it back.
46	7	"Kinderprison/Each Sold Evilly"	March 21, 2012	July 14, 2012	307
46	7	"Kinderprison/Each Sold Evilly"	April 23, 2012	July 14, 2012	307
Voltar's evil genius is put to the test as he must escape the most horrifying prison ever built in the history of all things evil: A super kiddie daycare. / When Voltar is outraged when he discovers the neighbourhood children playing with Force Fighter V action figures, he commissions Frogg to build some for him. But the L.O.S.E figures soon turn on their creators and take over the lair.
47	8	"Gameageddon/Chez Voltar"	April 24, 2012	July 21, 2012	308
47	8	"Gameageddon/Chez Voltar"	April 25, 2012	July 21, 2012	308
During a rainy day, The League plays Red Menace's childhood game, but when Voltar won and rubs it in his face, Red goes insane and tries to destroy the whole lair. / When his food gets Doomhound hair in it, Voltar opens up a restaurant with Doomhound hair being in the food.
48	9	"Brain Freeze/Henchstrike"	April 26, 2012	July 28, 2012	309
48	9	"Brain Freeze/Henchstrike"	April 27, 2012	July 28, 2012	309
Red's brain freeze inspires Voltar to give all of Metrotown brain freeze, but things go awry when the ice cream makes all of Metrotown snow monsters. / When Voltar pushes them to far, The Henchbots go on strike and pretty soon, all of the supervillain's henchmen are on strike also.
49	10	"Muhaha/The Art of Eviiil"	April 30, 2012	August 4, 2012	310
49	10	"Muhaha/The Art of Eviiil"	May 1, 2012	August 4, 2012	310
Voltar does the unthinkable and decides to super evil-y-fy his voice. / When the Metrotown Museum of Art unveils its latest exhibit, featuring portraits of the city's greatest villains, Voltar is furious he wasn't included.
50	11	"The Skulloshow/The Cute of All Evil"	May 2, 2012	August 11, 2012	311
50	11	"The Skulloshow/The Cute of All Evil"	May 3, 2012	August 11, 2012	311
Skullossus has the greatest evil plan ever and everything goes according to plan, until he realises he's also got a hot date on the same night as his evil plan. / Voltar hatches a brilliant evil plan when he sees how stupid and subservient people become when they see cute kittens.
51	12	"V-TV/Cloudy with a Chance of Stupid"	May 4, 2012	August 18, 2012	312
51	12	"V-TV/Cloudy with a Chance of Stupid"	May 7, 2012	August 18, 2012	312
When the League's TV bill went up, Voltar destroys TV and accidentally makes people happy in Metrotown, So to undo the good, The League makes their own TV channel, VTV to bring TV back to the town. / When Voltar's "Dumb Gas" accidentally spreads out in Metrotown during an alien invasion, the people in Metrotown get dumb and it is up to Voltar to save the city.
52	13	"LOSE Weight/Once Upon a LOSE"	May 8, 2012	August 25, 2012	313
52	13	"LOSE Weight/Once Upon a LOSE"	May 9, 2012	August 25, 2012	313
In an attempt to whip his minions into shape, Voltar decides to sign LOSE up with Metrotown's premier super gym, the Sweatorium. / Red Menace tells us the story about the one remaining question on everyone's minds: How did the League of Super Evil form? Note: This episode is the series finale.
