= Dragon Booster =

Canadian animated television series

- Title card
- Genre: Action; Adventure; Science fantasy Comedy drama Superhero
- Created by: Rob Travalino; Kevin Mowrer
- Directed by: George Samilski; J. Falconer; Steve Ball
- Voices of: Matt Hill; Kathleen Barr; Garry Chalk; Mark Oliver; Trevor Devall; Lee Tockar; Lenore Zann; Scott McNeil
- Theme music composer: Bob Buckley
- Composer: Bob Buckley
- Countries of origin: Germany; Canada
- Original languages: German; English; French
- No. of seasons: 3
- No. of episodes: 39

Production
- Executive producers: Ken Faier; Kevin Mowrer; Philip von Alvensleben; Jan Korbelin
- Producer: Asaph Fipke
- Running time: 21 minutes
- Production companies: Pacific Coast Productions (seasons 1–2); Film Financial & Productions (season 3); ApolloScreen Filmproduktion; Nerd Corps Entertainment; The Story Hat; Alliance Atlantis

Original release
- Network: CBC Television
- Release: October 23, 2004 – December 16, 2006

Dragon Booster is an animated series created by Rob Travalino and Kevin Mowrer for CBC Television that aired from October 23, 2004 to December 16, 2006. The first series produced by Nerd Corps Entertainment, the series is about young Artha Penn, a stable boy. He is chosen by Beaucephalis (or "Beau" for short), the dragon of legend, to be his rider, turning him into the Dragon Booster, a hero to protect the world from the impending Dragon-Human war and unite humans and dragons for all time.

== Plot ==
The story takes place in the world of Draconis, where 3,000 years ago, a huge dragon-human war erupted. The golden Dragon of Legend chose a human rider, the Dragon Booster, to bring peace and show that dragons and humans can coexist.

In the present-day, humans have been commanding dragons, the very thing the original Dragon Booster sought to prevent, and another war is looming. However, Connor Penn breeds back into existence one last Gold Dragon of Legend, Beau. Beau chooses a stable boy, Artha Penn, to be the Dragon Booster. Artha seeks to protect the world from the impending Dragon-Human war by defeating villains such as Moordryd Paynn and his father Word.

== Characters ==
=== Main ===
- Artha Tannis Penn (voiced by Matt Hill) is a 16-year-old stable boy, a street racer, and the main protagonist of the series. After being chosen by Beau as his rider, he becomes the Dragon Booster, a hero sworn to protect the world from another Dragon-Human War. He is also the leader of his own racing team known as the Penn Racing Crew, and is the son of Connor and Fira Penn.
- Lance Patrick Penn (voiced by Kathleen Barr) is Artha's little brother, and a member of the Penn Racing Crew. He has a blue Energy-class dragon named Fracshun.
- Parmon Sean (voiced by Lee Tockar) is Artha's best friend and the technology geek as well as mechanic of the Penn Racing Crew. He also has advanced knowledge of just about everything. He has a Bull-class dragon named Cyranno.
- Kitt Wonn (voiced by Lenore Zann) is the sole female member of the Penn Racing Crew, and a skilled racer. Artha is shown to have feelings for her, and likewise she is shown to have a crush on the Dragon Booster. She has a red Fire-class dragon named Wyldfyr.
- Connor Penn (voiced by Garry Chalk) was the owner of Penn Stables, father of Artha Penn and enemy of Word Paynn. For most of the series, Connor disguises himself as the character Mortis, a mentor of the Penn Racing Crew. He did this to allow Artha to develop on his own without relying on his father, as well as to watch over his two sons with no interference.
- Beaucephalis "Beau" is the Dragon of Legend and distantly related to the first Dragon of Legend who stopped the original Dragon-Human War. He is Artha's dragon partner. His Special Abilities include; Mag Shield, Furox Form, Five Draconium Colors of Balance Mag Manipulation, and Black Draconium Use.

=== Antagonists ===
- Word Paynn (voiced by Mark Oliver) is the father of Moordryd Paynn and the main antagonist of the series. His main goal is to start another Dragon-Human War, confident that he can control the war and whatever benefits it can give to him. He owns Paynn Inc, a company that manufactures cutting edge racing and battling gear. Throughout the first half of the series, his plans tend to revolve around stealing the dragon of legend, Beau. He is later revealed to be Drakkus, a warrior with ancient armor from 3000 years ago and rides a pure black dragon, named Abandonn.
- Moordryd Paynn (voiced by Trevor Devall) is the 16-year-old leader of the Dragon Eye Crew and the son of Word Paynn. Moordryd starts as one of the main antagonists of the series and the primary enemy of Artha Penn. But as the series progresses, he is shown to have heroic qualities within him and develops into a more complex anti-hero. Later, under the guidance of Armeggadon, Moordryd finds a Black Draconium gauntlet and becomes the Shadow Booster, possessing power to rival that of even the Dragon Booster. He rides a black dragon, named Decepshun.
- Armeggaddon (voiced by Gerad Plunkett) was, 3,000 years ago, an enemy of the original Dragon Booster and helped start the original Dragon-Human War. He was imprisoned in the Shadow Track by the original Shadow Booster, until Artha and Moordryd broke the spell. Armeggaddon mentors Moordryd, who becomes the Shadow Booster.
- Cain (voiced by Scott McNeil) is Moordryd Paynn's key lieutenant as well as his closest friend.

=== Recurring characters ===
- Phistus (voiced by Andrew Francis) is the leader of the Grip of the Dragon crew, as well as the Down City Council of Twelve. He is also the all-time Dragon City jousting champion. He rides a green Bull-class dragon, named Brutaris.
- Pyrrah (voiced by Nicole Oliver) is a street racer and the leader of the Dragon Flares Crew. She is Sparkk's elder sister and rides a red Magma-class dragon, named Phorrj.
- Khatah (voiced by Lee Tockar) is the leader of the Inner Order Crew. He and his crew are former world champions of the Horn of Libris Tournament, before they were defeated, with a bit of cheating by Moordryd and Cain. He rides a blue Energy-class dragon, named Shock-Ra.
- Captain Faier (voiced by Trevor Devall) is the new head of Dragon City Security headquartered at Precinct. He rides a blue Energy-class dragon, named Cuffs.
- Stewardd is the short, reclusive leader of the Dragon Keepers crew
- Propheci (voiced by Michael Kopsa) is the true leader of the Prophets Crew, an orange Control-class dragon. His human rider was Reepyr (also voiced by Michael Kopsa) who - along with his fellow riders - submitted to the control of their dragons. Propheci wants the Dragon Booster destroyed to prevent humans from controlling dragons.
- Chute (voiced by Kathleen Barr) is the Academy's top cadet student and the leader of the Dragon Winds Crew. She rides a white dragon, named Turbulence.
- Sentrus (voiced by Nicole Oliver) is the Academy scout who shows interest in Artha Penn and Moordryd Paynn.

== Episodes ==
=== Season 1 (2004–05) ===
No. in season	Title	Directed by	Written by	Original release date	Prod. code
1	"The Choosing (Part 1)"	Steve Ball	Rob Travalino	October 23, 2004	101
Artha Penn's father, Connor Penn, has successfully bred a gold dragon, a breed considered extinct and spoken of only in ancient legends. But this isn't just any gold dragon, this dragon possesses the legendary gold element which makes it the Black and Gold Dragon of Legend. The gold dragon, Beaucephalis (nicknamed 'Beau'), must choose a rider to become the Dragon Booster, but Word Paynn sends his son, Moordryd Paynn and his crew, the Dragon Eyes, to attack Connor's home and steal the dragon.
2	"The Choosing (Part 2)"	George Samilski	Rob Travalino	October 30, 2004	102
Artha's father is missing, Penn Stables is a mess, and Beau has chosen Artha to be the Dragon Booster. Artha races in the All City Races to earn money and train as the Dragon Booster. Artha meets a Dragon Priest named Mortis, and is given a gold draconium gauntlet. With the gauntlet and amulet that Artha was given by his father combined, Artha transforms into the Dragon Booster.
3	"Into the Fire"	Sebastian Brodin	Rob Travalino	November 6, 2004	103
The Dragon City racer, Pyrrah from the Dragon Flares Crew, is normally one of the cleanest racers on the track. Pyrrah falls under the control of Word's mind control pod, kidnaps Lance, Artha's 10-year-old brother, and makes a deal with Artha: If Artha wins a race, he gets Lance back, if not, he loses Lance and Beau.
4	"Opposing Force"	George Samilski	Raul Inglis	November 13, 2004	104
The Dragon Eyes Crew is responsible for a bank heist. But somehow, they manage to frame the Grip of the Dragon Crew. Moordryd challenged Phistus, the leader of the Grip of the Dragon Crew, to a jousting competition. If Moordryd wins, he takes over Phistus at the role of being the leader of the Down City Council of Twelve. Word Paynn creates a wraith dragon to help Moordryd win the joust.
5	"Fanning the Flames"	Sebastian Brodin	Richard Elliott, Simon Racioppa	November 20, 2004	105
Word Paynn sends all of the Down City Crews on a quest to retrieve an ancient red draconium bonemark called the Furox. The Furox is very dangerous and contains the soul of an ancient red draconium dragon. Dragon racer Kitt Wonn is mad at Artha for 'stealing her moves and not thanking her' and is tricked by Pyrrah to get the bonemark. In this episode, Artha reveals to her that he is the Dragon Booster.
6	"The Stand"	Steve Ball	Rob Travalino	December 4, 2004	106
Artha is exhausted from racing and training as the Dragon Booster and accepts a sponsor that gives away free racing gear that would help him in dragon racing. The sponsor gives him a high quality green ramming gear and Artha takes it home. Artha doesn't know that this sponsor is actually Word Paynn and the gear is a black draconium wraith gear for Beau in the shape of a green ramming gear and painted green. Word succeeds in controlling Beau and turns him into a wraith dragon.
7	"The Horn of Libris"	Steve Ball	Raul Inglis	January 15, 2005	107
Moordryd wins the Horn of Libris race by cheating, using a wraith dragon to slow Artha and Khatah, the Horn of Libris champion down. Moordryd succeeds and both Artha and Khatah find that the horn calls the ancient grey draconium dragon, Libris, for battle and they both intend to get the horn.
8	"Three Times a Hero"	George Roman Samilski	Raul Inglis	January 22, 2005	108
When Artha is simultaneously required to participate in a street race, speak to the Down City Council leader Phistus, and Dragon City Security head, Captain Faier, Lance and Parmon help him out by posing as the Dragon Booster and Artha Penn while Kitt is abducted by Moordryd's crew as a trap for the Dragon Booster.
9	"All is Not Lost"	Sebastian Brodin	Rob Travalino	January 29, 2005	109
Artha falls into a trap set by Word Paynn and finds himself deep below Dragon City in the Waste Lands of Loane where he meets the short, reclusive leader of the Dragon Keepers crew, Stewardd. But he is also near the lair of an energy-draining dragon called the Muhorta, which Word plans to use to capture the Dragon Booster and Dragon of Legend.
10	"The Lost Track of Doom"	Steve Ball	Steve Ball	February 5, 2005	110
During a marathon race, Artha and his friends fall into a trap by Moordryd and land in the ancient Track of Doom, realm of the ancient, warlike Dragon Prophets; they must convince the head of the dragons, Propheci, that they have the strength to prevent a new war between dragons and humans.
11	"Pride of the Hero"	George Roman Samilski	Jules Dennis	February 19, 2005	111
Tired of being lectured by his father for not winning races, Moordryd plans to 'be a hero' in Dragon City and controls Wraith dragons to do all the crime. Artha is saved by Moordryd Paynn in his Dragon Booster form and doesn't get how Moordryd beats off all the Wraith dragons when he can't. Moordryd says that maybe he could be the Dragon Booster too and Artha takes this as a joke and lets Moordryd sit on Beau. Beau accepts Moordryd and Moordryd quickly places the red draconium bonemark, Furox, on Beau's head.
12	"Misjudged"	Sebastian Brodin	Rob Travalino	March 5, 2005	112
Artha misjudges Kawake, retired champion of the sport of drag-ball. Kawake is ashamed of himself of being paralyzed and Word tells Kawake he can still be the champion if he digs for grey draconium to make him stronger. This is all a trick and Kawake finds himself mining for black draconium directly below the city's support columns.
13	"The Chromatic Dragon"	Blair Simmons	Richard Elliott & Simon Racioppa	April 9, 2005	113
The strongest dragons from all the crews are abducted and Artha begins to doubt himself as a leader when he let Phistus' dragon, Brutaris get taken by the Army of the Dragon crew, even though Word is collecting all the abducted dragon's draconium energy to create an artificial bonemark to create his own Dragon of Legend, the Chromatic dragon.
14	"If It Ain't Broke"	George Roman Samilski	Raul Inglis	May 21, 2005	114
Artha is given rare light green deflection gear by Stewardd to help him win an upcoming race, but Moordryd plans to steal it. Parmon breaks the real gear, swaps it out for homemade gear of his own to fix the real gear, and Lance replaces it with an outright fake.

=== Season 2 (2005–06) ===
No. in season	Title	Directed by	Written by	Original release date	Prod. code
15	"Rules of Power"	Sebastian Brodin	Steve Ball	June 4, 2005	115
Word Paynn gives Khatah, the leader of the Inner Order crew, a map to the bone-mark of an ancient blue warrior dragon, but Parmon falls under its influence instead and he and his dragon Cyrano set off to find the blue draconium bonemark, the Samurox. Cyrano becomes the Samurox and calls all of the blue dragons to war.
16	"Broken Bonds"	Stephane Podorieszach	Alan Gregg	September 17, 2005	116
Beau is poisoned by liquified black draconium from Word Paynn, which corrupts his blood, turning it black which leads to Beau's gold draconium being replaced by black draconium. Artha tries to find a way to cure Beau and Mortis gives him a vial of liquid gold draconium. Meanwhile, Beau's golden marks are fading away quickly.
17	"Faster Than Fear"	George Roman Samilski	Sean Jara	September 25, 2005	117
Moordryd and Cain kidnap Lance to lure the Dragon Booster into an ancient cave known as the "Shadow Track"; all four of them become trapped inside, and subjected to their own fears. Artha learns how to control his fears and listens to Mortis' advice: "Only when you can truly face your fears can you become the Dragon Booster".
18	"The Leap of Lorius"	Sebastian Brodin	Rob Travalino	October 1, 2005	118
Moordryd has set a trap in an upcoming rookie race called the Leap of Lorius. The trap's aim is to turn the rookie racers into human wraiths, and the only way to avoid it is for Artha to attempt a legendary shortcut, and somehow convince other racers to do the same.
19	"The Wraith Booster"	Stephane Podorieszach	Rob Travalino	October 8, 2005	119
The Dragon Booster falls into a trap set by Word Paynn and under control of powerful new gear that turns him and Beau into wraiths. Artha and Beau activate these ancient black draconium mind pods which sends destruction and fear.
20	"Artha the Drac"	George Roman Samilski	Steve Ball	October 15, 2005	120
Artha doesn't have many fans like all the other races, but when he saves a young boy from being trampled by dragons, he earns his place as a hero. Vociferous, leader of the Voice of the Dragon crew makes Artha a superstar, but there is more going on behind the scenes.
21	"Prophet's Motive"	Sebastian Brodin	Mark Leiren-Young	October 22, 2005	121
The orange dragon Propheci appears in Dragon City to ask the Dragon Booster for help in stopping a civil war among his clan, but it is really a plot to draw the Dragon Booster away from the city so his clan can attack. Mortis is controlled by orange control gear by Propheci and becomes his rider.
22	"Still Waters Freeze"	Steve Ball	Raul Inglis	November 5, 2005	122
The Dragon Booster is given an ancient device from the Dragon Fish crew for safekeeping, but Moordryd, curious and power hungry intends to steal the gear. He is given an amulet by a mysterious someone and learns he can defeat the Dragon Booster by using the gear.
23	"The Mechanist"	George Roman Samilski	Paul Robinson	November 12, 2005	123
A member of the Mechanists called Rivett, who seems to be on no one's side but his own, appears in Dragon City to find and take the Horn of Libris. All the Down city crews intend to keep the Horn of Libris to themselves and rush off to steal it.
24	"Darkness Falls"	Sebastian Brodin	J. Falconer	November 20, 2005	124
During a race, Artha loses his amulet. Word Paynn sends Moordryd to steal dragon eggs so he can change their draconium colour to pure black using a device he created. Artha, Parmon and Kitt are all trapped in the room the dragons are held in and Lance goes off to find the amulet.
25	"The Return of Drakkus, Part 1"	Stephane Podorieszach	Rob Travalino	December 3, 2005	125
Mortis detects a powerful black draconium energy surge beneath Dragon City, and Artha insists on investigating it despite being warned that it is too powerful even for the hero of legend. Moordryd wishes to find the black draconium gauntlet of sight to become the Shadow Booster, as told by his mentor, Armeggadon.
26	"The Return of Drakkus, Part 2"	George Roman Samilski	Rob Travalino	February 6, 2006	126
Mortis intervenes to save Artha from an elite warrior named Drakkus, but is injured during the fight; Mortis reveals himself as Artha's father (contradicting earlier official information that the two were separate characters), and Artha must find a way to release not only Beau's power, but his own as well and Moordryd succeeds in finding the gauntlet.

=== Season 3 (2006) ===
No. in season	Title	Directed by	Written by	Original release date	Prod. code
27	"Paynn Rising"	Sebastian Brodin	Mark Leiren-Young	September 9, 2006	127
After finding the gauntlet, Armeggadon teaches Moordryd to use mag claw movements and Moordryd uses those mag movements during a race. Artha intends to use the mag claw movements to beat Moordryd at his own game.
28	"The Changelings"	Steve Ball	Rob Travalino, Kevin Mowrer	September 16, 2006	128
Artha and Beau accidentally get their minds switched by Word's Mind Gear. The gear goes missing and if they don't find it and change them back, both Artha and Beau could be stuck like that forever.
29	"Framed"	George Roman Samilski, Stephane Podorieszach	Alan Gregg	September 23, 2006	129
Phistus gets framed again. Artha and Kitt get framed as well for sabotaging Moordryd in a race. Breakout from Dragon City Precinct is staged with the help of Academy Racer Chute. Will the trio prove their innocence?
30	"The Eye of the Dragon"	Sebastian Brodin	Rob Travalino	September 30, 2006	130
Moordryd finds a black draconium bone mark called the Vysox and Decepshun absorbs it permanently, growing more powerful and more pure blooded. Moordryd also finds a map leading to the Bone Marks of the League of Eight. Will Artha and Beau be able to stop them before the most powerful dragons of the Dragon Human War are released?
31	"No Paynn, No Gain"	Rav Grewal	Sean Jara	October 7, 2006	131
Word tries to harm the Penn racing crew but is transformed into a zombie himself by dragons bane. Artha in order to save him enters the academy with help of Rivett and hopefully, save Word Paynn's life before it is too late.
32	"When Opposites Attract"	Stephane Podorieszach	J. Falconer	October 14, 2006	132
After Artha's draconium energy gets drained by the Shadow Booster, Artha and Kitt are both thrown into the Waste Lands of Loan. Propheci captures Stewardd to be his rider and they all attack the Dragon Booster. Is this the end of the hero of legend?
33	"The Defiants"	Sebastian Brodin	Rob Travalino	October 21, 2006	133
Seeing a reckless Mag Battle between Artha and Moordryd, Sentrus cancels the Racing Season. Can Artha and the Other Downcity Crews right this wrong, or will Moordryd get into the Academy by default?
34	"Slithercorp"	Rav Grewal	Sean Jara	October 28, 2006	134
A new company by the name of Slithercorp is training riders directly into the elite class, bypassing the academy. Kitt signs up after losing a race and getting dropped out of the academy running due to helping Artha. But is the new company legal or is it just another trap by Word Paynn?
35	"The Mouth that Roared"	Stephane Podorieszach	Raul Inglis	November 4, 2006	135
Lance finds out that Moordryd is dealing with the black marketeer, Malto and is planning to use elite class gear to win in the Survival Dome challenge but nobody believes Lance. Will Moordryd be caught or will he get away with it?
36	"Professor Stubborn"	Sebastian Brodin	Rob Travalino	November 11, 2006	136
The group go to an ancient Green draconium Stronghold where the rest disappear and Parm is tested to see if he is worthy of a great power.
37	"Cain's Mutiny"	Rav Grewal	Mark Leiren-Young	November 18, 2006	137
During stealing dragons, a group of dragon city security rush to capture Moordryd and Cain. Moordryd takes off and transforms into the Shadow Booster to fend them off. Cain is angry that Moordryd ran off, leaving him with the guards. Cain and the rest of the Dragon Eyes bail on Moordryd and cut Moordryd from the crew.
38	"Battle for the Ages"	Stephane Podorieszach	Rob Travalino	December 9, 2006	138
In the final elimination race, Armeggadon tries to destroy Artha and Beau. Moordryd and Artha find out each other's secret identities and join forces along with Drakkus and Mortis to defeat Armeggadon in a battle for the ages.
39	"Damaged Goods"	Sebastian Brodin	Rob Travalino	December 16, 2006	139
Only one more Academy event remains: the Dragon City Academy Dragball Elimination Challenge, but Artha gets badly hurt fighting with the Shadow Booster. Will he take part or will he quit? Find out in the awe-inspiring conclusion of Dragon Booster.

== International broadcast ==
In March 2004, it was announced that ABC Family (United States), Five and Sky One (United Kingdom) and ABC (Australia) and Spacetoon and MBC 3 (Arab World) acquired broadcast rights to the show in their respective countries.

== Cancellation ==
The end of the final episode of the third season alluded to a planned name change to Dragon Booster: Academy for the next season. However, in an interview with Matt Hill (the voice of Artha Penn) on June 10, 2006, at the Otakuthon convention held in Concordia University, it was made apparent that Dragon Booster failed to pull together a large enough fan base and production has permanently ceased on the series. He stated, "We did not get the following 13 episodes." When asked why the series lost its bid for more episodes, Hill responded, "They were not selling enough action figures".
