= Hybridity Music =

- Founded: 2012
- Founder: Malcolm Levy
- Genre: Various
- Country of origin: Canada
- Location: Vancouver
- Official website: http://hybriditymusic.com/

Hybridity Music, commonly referred to as Hybridity, is an independent Canadian record label.

== History ==
Founded in Vancouver by Malcolm Levy in 2012, Hybridity is an artist-run label that works in the areas where performance, music, art, and technology cross over.

Their first release was the Traps EP by Vancouver duo Humans. The label was introduced by XLR8R with a video for the Max Ulis remix of "De Ceil."

Hybridity Music is part of a larger concept centring on trans-disciplinary art and collaborative practice. Hybridity is focused on artists who produce cross genre'd music and media that span installation, visual art, music, technology, and performance.

As an artist-run label, Hybridity supports music artists by handling their management, distribution, PR, publishing, branding, and overall trajectory, improving their aesthetics through consultation, discussion, and implementation.

Hybridity regularly throws events and curates exhibitions in Vancouver and New York.

== Artists past and present ==
- BCBG
- Calamalka
- Dreamboat
- Gang Signs
- Humans
- Ladyfrnd
- Michael Brock
- Monolithium
- Sabota
- Snowday
- Speaker Face
- Thomas Cade
- Wolfey

== Discography ==
- HYB001: Humans – Traps EP (2012.03.06)
- HYB002: Calamalka – All the Way Up (2012.07.24)
- HYB003: Thomas Cade – Greenwich Mean Time (2013.02.15)
- HYB004: Humans – Nine Tenths single (2013.02.18)
- HYB005: Gang Signs – Remixes EP (2013.02.26)
- HYB006: BCBG – "Chappelle Abstraite" (2013.06.08)
- HYB007: Dreamboat – "Boy" (2013.06.01)
- HYB008: Ladyfrnd – "Ladyfrnd" (2013.06.15)
- HYB009: "Bass Coast 2013 Humans Remixed" (2013.12.11)
- HYB010: Wolfey – "Wolfey" (2013.11.26)
- HYB011: Sabota – "Sabota" (2014.02.21)

== See also ==
- Lists of record labels
- List of electronic music record labels
- Hybridity
- Electronic music
- Indie electronic
- Intelligent dance music
- Techno
