= Calamalka =

Canadian hip hop and electronic music producer

- Origin: Vancouver, British Columbia, Canada
- Genres: Electronic music
- Years active: 2000 - Present
- Labels: Hybridity Music; Plug Research
- Website: Soundcloud

Calamalka is a Canadian hip hop and electronic music producer based in Vancouver.

== Biography ==
Born Michael Campitelli, Calamalka released his debut album Shredders Dub in 2004. The album received positive press.

In 2012, he released his sophomore album All the Way Up.

== Discography ==
=== Albums ===
Year	Title	Label
2004	Shredders Dub	Plug Research
2012	All the Way Up	Hybridity Music

=== EPs ===
Year	Title	Label
2002	Calamalka EP	Stereo-vidual
