= Humans (Canadian band) =

Canadian indie electronic pop duo

- Origin: Vancouver, British Columbia, Canada
- Genres: Electropop; Synth-pop; Indietronica; Indie pop Electro
- Years active: 2009–present
- Labels: Hybridity Music
- Members: Robbie Slade; Peter Ricq
- Website: dashumans.com

Humans are a Canadian indie electronic pop duo.

== History ==
Vancouver's Robbie Slade and Peter Ricq met in 2008, and started making music together in the summer of 2009. They released a demo album in 2009. In 2010, the duo released their first EP called Avec Mes Mecs, and produced a video for its title track. Promotion through BIRP (an indie music blog and monthly playlist) along with fan-made videos ushered in the release of the official video in 2011.

Following up Avec Mes Mecs, the duo released their sophomore EP called Traps in 2012. The release received high praise from publications such as DJ Mag, Exclaim!, and Resident Advisor. A video for the song "Horizon" was premiered on Spinner.

== Techniques, technology, live performances ==
Humans have garnered a reputation for being a live act that is "full of unbelievable energy and ready to engage with the crowd." Their visual presentation uses live audio input from their shows, allowing for improvisation in both their visual and audio performances.

On tour, Humans have opened for Broken Social Scene, The Crystal Method, Junior Boys, and Clipse.

== Discography ==
=== Albums ===
Year	Album details	Peak Chart Positions	
Year	Album details	!earshot Top 200	!earshot Top 20 Electronic
2009	Humans: Released: September 2009; Label: Self-Released	–	–
2015	NOONTIDE: Released: 24 February; Label: Hybridity Music		

=== Extended plays ===
Year	EP details	Peak Chart Positions	
Year	EP details	!earshot Top 200	!earshot Top 20 Electronic
2010	Avec Mes Mecs: Released: 12 October 2010; Label: Self-Released	62	18
2012	Traps: Released: 6 March 2012; Label: Hybridity Music	17	1

=== Singles ===
- "The End" (2011)

=== Remixes ===
- Yes Nice – "Horses" (2012)
- The Belle Game – "Wasted Light" (2012)
