= League of Super Evil =

Canadian animated television series

- Title card
- Genre: Action; Comedy; Slapstick
- Created by: Philippe Ivanusic-Vallée; Davila LeBlanc; Peter Ricq
- Based on: Once Were Heroes by Ryan Harper-Brown
- Developed by: Asaph Fipke
- Voices of: Scott McNeil; Colin Murdock; Lee Tockar; Tabitha St. Germain
- Theme music composer: Steffan Andrews; Hal Beckett
- Opening theme: "League of Super Evil"
- Ending theme: "League of Super Evil" (instrumental)
- Composers: Steffan Andrews; Hal Beckett
- Country of origin: Canada
- Original language: English
- No. of seasons: 3
- No. of episodes: 52 (104 segments) (list of episodes)

Production
- Executive producers: Asaph Fipke; Ken Faier; Chuck Johnson
- Producer: Asaph Fipke
- Running time: 22 minutes (2 11–minute segments)
- Production company: Nerd Corps Entertainment

Original release
- Network: YTV
- Release: March 7, 2009 – August 25, 2012

League of Super Evil (initialized as L.O.S.E. or LOSE) is a Canadian animated comedy television series co-created by Philippe Ivanusic-Vallée, Davila LeBlanc and Peter Ricq and developed by Asaph Fipke. Inspired by a comedy sketch, "Once Were Heroes", by Ryan Harper-Brown, the series was produced by Nerd Corps Entertainment in association with YTV.

The series aired for 52 episodes from March 7, 2009, to August 25, 2012. Reruns ended on YTV on September 2, 2014, when Teletoon picked it up for additional reruns.

== Plot ==
The League of Super Evil (or "L.O.S.E.") is a group of so-called "supervillains" who are plotting to take over their neighborhood in Metrotown and the world ultimately, but their plans usually involve pranks such as gluing a penny to a chair.

While all the other citizens in the neighborhood live in suburban houses, The League has a "secret evil lair".

The League is often at odds with other, more important and competent supervillains such as Skullossus and also try to avoid getting busted by Metrotown's residential superheroes.

== Episodes ==
Season	Episodes	Segments	Season premiere	Season finale
1	26	52	March 7, 2009	December 18, 2009
2	13	26	September 11, 2010	December 11, 2010
3	13	26	June 2, 2012	August 25, 2012

== Characters ==
=== League of Super Evil (L.O.S.E.) ===
The League of Super Evil (or L.O.S.E. for short) are the titular main protagonists of the series. The members are:

- Voltar (voiced by Scott McNeil) is the short, self-proclaimed leader and commander of the League. He is not very bright and always takes Doktor Frogg's ideas as his own and thinks that his pranks are "evil plans". He has a nemesis named Bundlington Von Pantaloon who was his rival from Kiddy College. In the episode "Once Upon a L.O.S.E", it is revealed that Voltar used to be a heroic hall monitor who protected kids from harm and became a supervillain after being humiliated by Glory Guy.
- Doktor Frogg (voiced by Lee Tockar) is a self-proclaimed mad scientist and inventor for the League who has mechanical hands. He is often tormented by Doomageddon, who tries to eat him. Out of all the members in the League, Frogg aspires to be a true villain and often has much more evil aspirations compared to Voltar.
- Red Menace (voiced by Colin Murdock) is the strong, happy-go-lucky member of the League. He is best friends with Doomageddon. In "Gameageddon", it is shown that Red has very destructive anger issues when losing a game and/or someone rubbing it in for winning a game.
- Doomageddon is a doomhound who originates from another dimension. He is known for tormenting and torturing Doktor Frogg. Doomageddon is able to teleport, breathe fire, change size, levitate, turn invisible, walk on walls and tear holes through time and space.
- Henchbot #17 and Henchbot #32 are the robotic servants of L.O.S.E. who easily fall apart.

=== Supervillains ===
The League of Super Evil often ends up in conflict with other supervillains in Metrotown who are more important and competent than they are:

- Skullossus (voiced by Colin Murdock) is the top supervillain in Metrotown. In "World Wreckers", Skullossus holds the most evil world records at the total of 114 records broken.
  - The Skullmandos are the robotic foot soldiers of Skullosus.
- The Cougar (voiced by Tabitha St. Germain) is an elderly cat-themed supervillain and famous super-thief. She is very flirtatious and often attempts to hit on younger men.
  - The Granny Goons (voiced by Tabitha St. Germain) are the elderly henchwomen of the Cougar.
- Linemaster (voiced by Ian James Corlett) is a supervillain obsessed with being first in line so that he can have bragging rights. He has the ability to summon his loyal Linebots behind him. Linemaster is currently held captive in the Halls of Glory as one of Glory Guy's villain trophies.
  - The Linebots are the robotic minions of Linemaster.
- Commander Chaos (voiced by Colin Murdock) is the archenemy of Force Fighters V who controls the Shuriken Typhoon Super S Atomic Destructo-Bot.
- Doom Driver (voiced by Colin Murdock) is an undead villain who lives a block away from the League of Super Evil. He drives his Doom Mobile and challenges street racers to a race where the winner gets the opponent's vehicle, which he always wins.
- Rock Gothlington (voiced by Scott McNeil) is a rock metal-themed supervillain and a famous rock star.
- Evil Stevens (voiced by Colin Murdock) is the proprietor of the supervillain store "Rotten Core". Evil Stevens is a parody of Steve Jobs and his Rotten Core company is a parody of Apple.
  - The Henchbot Elites (voiced by Scott McNeil) are large and muscular robots sold at Rotten Core. Some of them work for Evil Stevens. Despite being able to accept orders, they require constant upgrades for simple tasks.
- Jules LeSimian (voiced by Lee Tockar) is a gorilla and the manager of the restaurant Villaynes. Its reservations is so long that customers cryogenically freeze themselves to wait for their table.
  - Ninja Waiters are the staff of Villaynes who work for Jules LeSimian as security guards and waiters.
- Mysterio Villaino (voiced by Peter Kelamis) is a mysterious villain who resembles Voltar. He wears a trench coat with a brimmed hat, curling mustache, and dark sunglasses.
- 8-Ball (voiced by Lee Tockar) is a villain who dresses like an 8-Ball.
- Malachi Milk (voiced by Scott McNeil) is a child prodigy in villainy who Red Menace mentors for the Cool Buddy Foundation.
- Babooshka (voiced by Tabitha St. Germain) is a Russian secret agent who works for the Federation of Nefarious Minds. She will continuously double cross anyone she works for her own gain.
- Destruktor (voiced by Scott McNeil) is a demonic warlord who possesses immense power. He is able to warp reality and potentially destroy the universe.
- Bundlington Von Pantaloon III (voiced by Colin Murdock) is Voltar's old rival and former friend from Supervillain Kiddy College. He and Voltar used to be best friends until both of them pulled a prank in school, and Voltar boasted that he took all the credit for it. As such, they started to hate each other and become rivals.
- Humungo (voiced by Colin Murdock) is an evil alien who has destroyed and conquered many planets across the galaxy.
- The Legion of Supreme Evil are the doppelgänger version of the League. They only appear in "A Lose/Lose Situation".
  - Bolkar (voiced by Scott McNeil) is the leader of the Legion of Supreme Evil; Voltar's doppelgänger.
  - Doktor Squid (voiced by Lee Tockar) is the mad scientist and originator of the Legion; Doktor Frogg's doppelgänger.
  - Green Menace (voiced by Colin Murdock) is the muscle for the Legion; Red Menace's doppelgänger.
  - Chaosageddon is the Legion's pan-dimensional doomhound pet; Doomageddon's doppelgänger.

=== Superheroes ===
Metrotown has an assortment of superheroes who protect Metrotown and who the League of Super Evil often try to avoid:

- General Sargent (voiced by Blu Mankuna) is the general of the military force S.W.E.A.T. His daughter is Elizabeth Sargent. General Sargent has a loud voice, is often shouting orders or one-liners and will often go out the front lines himself against villainy.
  - Elizabeth "Liz" Sargent (voiced by Tabitha St. Germain) is General Sargent's short-tempered and spoiled daughter.
- The Legion of Glory is a superhero team that operates in Metrotown.
  - Glory Guy (voiced by Lee Tockar) is one of Metrotown's greatest superheroes. He lives in the Halls of Glory and is the leader of the Legion of Glory. He is a parody of Superman.
  - Wow Woman (voiced by Tabitha St. Germain) is a member of the Legion of Glory. Voltar, Doktor Frogg, Red Menace, and most of Metrotown's citizens have crushes on her. She is shown to be a parody of Wonder Woman.
  - NightShade (voiced by Scott McNeil) is a superhero who is a member of the Legion of Glory. As his name implies, he fights crime during the night. Nightshade has a father named Dayshade, who crashed into a building after he was blinded by a young Voltar. NightShade is a parody of Batman.
- Justice Gene (voiced by Colin Murdock) is a wannabe superhero who is the victim/target for the League of Super Evil's "evil plans". He first appears in "Justice Gene" when he gives the League too many rules for their pranks, including being rude and annoying to the neighborhood than they are. Eventually, he got "sent back to basics" by his chief due to a rule he broke when his socks were covered in stinky cheese (because of the League's stinky cheese piñata) and he wore mismatching socks.
- The Force Fighters V are five heroes in Metrotown who are Super Sentai/Power Rangers parodies and also own a sushi restaurant in town when not fighting crime. Red Menace joins the group briefly with the name Turquoise, piloting the Marvellous Moustache.
  - Rosé (voiced by Asaph Fipke) is the short leader of the team who pilots the Cool Jet.
  - Seafoam Green (voiced by Lee Tockar) is a bulk member of the team who pilots the Gnarly Tank.
  - Goldenrod (voiced by Tabitha St. Germain) is a female member of the team who pilots the Slick Hovercraft.
  - Magenta (voiced by Peter Kelamis) is a scrawny member of the team who pilots the Sweet Attack Helicopter.
  - Perrywinkle (voiced by Colin Murdock) is an obese member of the Force Fighters V who pilots the Giant Blue Hand.
- Suzie Scout Master Sweets (voiced by Tabitha St. Germain) is the tough-as-nails scoutmaster of the Suzie Scouts, an organization of girl scouts who go door to door selling cookies (which everyone refuses to say no to them).
  - The Cookie Commandos are the elite ninja squad of Suzie Scouts who are ordered to attack anyone who refuse to buy their cookies.
- Nanny Boo Boo (voiced by Tabitha St. Germain) is a nanny-like superhero. She is a strict woman obsessed with safety and discipline, but with good intentions. In "Kinderprison", she runs a daycare for all the super children of Metrotown, where all superheros and villains send their children.
- Dipper the Dolphin is a genetically engineered dolphin created by S.W.E.A.T. to be a highly trained aquatic soldier. He is skilled in combat, can walk on land, flies like an airplane, and can retract weapons from his blowhole.
- White Knight (voiced by Scott McNeil) is a retired knight-themed superhero. Previously a muscle-bound protector of justice, now a weak narcoleptic old man who is pushed around on a gurney.

=== Other characters ===
Besides L.O.S.E., the superheroes, and the supervillains, the show also has a large variety of other characters that are seen throughout the show. They are:

- Steve (voiced by Lee Tockar) is the League of Super Evil's next-door neighbor and one of Voltar's one-sided archenemies. His face is never seen throughout the show; only his voice can be heard repeating the phrase "I don't care!", which he will nonchalantly shout from off-screen whenever Voltar mentions him.
- Mr. Nelson (voiced by Colin Murdock) is one of the neighbors who lives across the street from the lair of the League. He is a somewhat middle-aged man who is a friendly neighbor, mows his lawn and attends the local science fair. He seems to be patient with the League in general, but is on friendly terms with Red Menace.
- Mrs. Johnson (voiced by Lee Tockar) is the neighborhood's sweet little old lady, she usually is seen riding on her slow mobility scooter.
- Guy (voiced by Lee Tockar) is a civilian who occasionally works in multiple jobs (including jobs working for villains).
- Whiskers is a cute innocent bunny that hops around Metrotown. Though she may look adorable, she can be quite ferocious at times with her sharp teeth (including making Doomageddon afraid of her).
- LAIR-Y (voiced by Colin Murdock) is an artificial intelligence created by Doktor Frogg to protect Voltar's bike. He takes his programming so seriously that he kicks the entire League out of the house.
- Chuckles (voiced by Lee Tockar) is a robotic clown created by Doktor Frogg many years ago to terrorize the neighborhood kids who did not invite him to their birthdays. Chuckles became unstable, causing him to attack anyone on their birthday.
- Kat Chatsworth (voiced by Tabitha St. Germain) is a civilian who never seems to stop talking, which will eventually cause anyone near her to fall asleep from boredom (although she doesn't seem to be aware of it).
- Kinder Kreep (voiced by Scott McNeil) is a dwarfish magical being who brings gifts to villains who have been evil yearly for "Chaos-Mas" (a villain holiday equivalent to Christmas).
- Mama Menace (voiced by Colin Murdock) is Red Menace's loving mother.
- Seymour Sweat (voiced by Scott McNeil) is the sweaty fitness instructor of Metrotown who is the owner of the "Sweatotorium". He takes his job so serious that he locks his own gym until his customers gets into shape and sweating.
- Prima Danna (voiced by Tabitha St. Germain) is a famous pop star in Metrotown who everyone admires.

== Production ==
When the series was first announced in October 2006, it underwent many changes for the title and main characters; Voltar was originally called The Great Voltar. His costume was green and yellow instead of red. Doktor Frogg originally had a steel jaw and did not wear goggles. Red Menace was meant to be a former Soviet supervillain (hence his name). His original design wore a thick red fur coat and a fur hat that incorporated the Red Star (a communist symbol) on it. Doomageddon did not exist in the original concept. In his place was a crawling hooded character described as embodying "the spirit of a hyperactive Neanderthal toddler". The series' title was originally just known as League of Evil.

== Broadcast and release ==
League of Super Evil premiered on YTV in Canada on 7 March 2009. It aired on Saturdays at 10:30 A.M., as part of its Crunch programming block. The series premiered earlier in the United States on Cartoon Network on 5 March 2009 at 9:00 P.M. It also premiered in Latin America on Disney XD on 4 June 2011, and aired in the UK on CBBC, in Australia on ABC1 and ABC3, and internationally on Cartoon Network, Disney XD and Nickelodeon.

As of 2024, the series is now available to stream on digital platforms such as Amazon Prime Video, Tubi, The Roku Channel, YouTube TV, and YouTube as well as many others.

== Reception ==
Emily Ashby of Common Sense Media gave the series a two out of five stars, stating "Too-chaotic 'toon follows villains' mostly harmless antics."

At Internet Movie Database, the user rating for the series is 6.2/10.

== Awards and nominations ==
Year	Association	Award Category	Notes	Result
2010	Writers Guild of Canada	Animation	Edward Kay	Nominated
2010	Leo Awards	Leo Best Animation Program or Series	Chuck Johnson, Ken Faier, Asaph Fipke	Won
2011	Leo Awards	Leo Best Musical Score in an Animation Program or Series	Hal Beckett, Steffan Andrews (for the episode "Ant-Archy!")	Nominated
2011	Gemini Awards	Gemini Best Sound in a Comedy, Variety, or Performing Arts Program or Series	Patrick Haskill, Steffan Andrews, Gordon Sproule, Johnny Ludgate, Ewan Deane (for the episode "Ant-Archy!")	Nominated
2011	Gemini Awards	Best Writing in a Children's or Youth Program or Series	Philippe Ivanusic-Vallée, Davila LeBlanc (for the episode "Voltina")	Nominated
2012	UBCP/ACTR Awards	Best Voice	Lee Tockar	Nominated
