= Rated A for Awesome =

Canadian animated TV series

- Genre: Comedy; Musical
- Created by: Asaph Fipke
- Directed by: Sebastian Brodin; George Samilski; Blair Simmons; Ray Grewal; Steve Ball
- Voices of: Sam Vincent; Brian Drummond; Colin Murdock; Chiara Zanni; Tabitha St. Germain; Kathleen Barr; Brian Dobson
- Theme music composer: Jonathan Evans
- Composer: Hal Beckett
- Country of origin: Canada
- No. of seasons: 1
- No. of episodes: 26 (52 segments)

Production
- Executive producers: Austin Petten; Asaph Fipke; Chuck Johnson; Ken Faier
- Producer: Asaph Fipke
- Running time: 22 minutes (11 minutes per segment)
- Production company: Nerd Corps Entertainment

Original release
- Network: YTV; Disney XD
- Release: June 20, 2011 – January 31, 2012

Rated A for Awesome is a Canadian cel-shaded computer animated television series created by Asaph Fipke. It premiered on Disney XD on June 20, 2011, followed by YTV in Canada on September 3, and ended on January 31, 2012. The series was produced by Nerd Corps Entertainment.

== Premise ==
It is about four twelve-year-olds and a pet monkey that go on different missions in order to turn boring experiences, like detention at school, into thrilling adventures.

== Characters ==
=== Main ===
- Lester "Les" Awesome (voiced by Samuel Vincent) is the leader, and the shortest of the team. He is the only one in his family who does not have a trophy until he was rewarded for saving someone's life. His catchphrase is "Time to awesomize!" in the intro. Les is Thera's step brother and he hates the last day of summer break and the countryside. He is also not very good at singing and dancing.
- Noam Plinsky (voiced by Brian Drummond) is a tall young man. He is an inventor who can operate anything. He also plays guitar and drums a lot and is very good at it. He has stage fright and hates being stared at. Like Les and Thera, Noam wears only one type of colour. He has a crush on Thera, but keeps it a secret from the rest of the team. In "Thera's Date with Destiny", it is shown that he will be her future prom date. When he shows sign of liking Thera, he just screams and runs away, or gets extremely embarrassed, blushes, and attempts to change the subject.
- Lars Arnst (voiced by Colin Murdock) is the fattest and craziest member. He has a Nordic accent. He is a great singer and actor and spent time in the school Glee Club, but his teacher fired him in "Lester's Song of Doom".
- Thera Kerplopolis (voiced by Chiara Zanni), as named by Principal in "Club Detention", sometimes mistakenly called Thera Awesome, is cute and athletic. She is ready for action and never gives up. Sometimes she has a little bit of a temper when it comes to rivals. She likes taking on risky tasks. She is also Les' stepsister and had a crush on Ned Falcon in "Awesome Ride", but now seems to be falling for Noam.
- Mr. Twitchy (voiced by Tabitha St. Germain) is an amazingly smart pet monkey who is always wearing a blonde wig. His catchphrase is "Ha cha cha!"

=== Recurring ===
==== Parents ====
- Max Awesome (voiced by Brian Dobson), father of Lester
- Angelina (voiced by Kathleen Barr), wife of Max and mother of Thera

==== Teachers ====
- Miss Dullmeister, music teacher
- Mister Fadenjeans, teacher of others
- Mister Noddenoff, teacher of Les

== Episodes ==
Ep#	Title 1	Title 2	Written by	Storyboarded by	Directed by	Original airdate
1	"X-Treme Teaching"	"Les' Song of Doom"	Vito Viscomi; Andrew Nicholls and Darrell Vickers	Christine Cunningham; Sam To	Rav Grewal; Blair Simmons	September 3, 2011
2	"Just Add Water"	"Melting the Ice"	Al Schwartz; Simon Racioppa and Richard Elliott	Steve LeCouilliard	George Samilski	September 10, 2011
3	"When Hall Freezes Over"	"Awesome Ride"	Carolyn Hay; Vito Viscomi	Brad Neave; Steve LeCouilliard	Steve Sacks	September 17, 2011
4	"Club Detention"	"Lawn Rangers"	Steve Sullivan; Robin Stein	Mike Myhre	Blair Simmons; Rav Grewal	September 24, 2011
5	"Sleep Smart"	"Leader of the Pack"	Dan Smith; Philippe Ivanusic-Vallée	Steve LeCouilliard; Christine Cunningham	Rav Grewal; Steve Ball	October 1, 2011
6	"Go Away Day"	"Incredi-Posse"	Simon Racioppa and Richard Elliott	Mike Myhre; Sam To	Blair Simmons; Steve Sacks	October 8, 2011
7	"Yearbooked"	"Lost in Character"	Dennis Heaton; Simon Racioppa and Richard Elliott	Brad Neave; Werner Marcus	George Samilski; Blair Simmons	October 15, 2011
8	"Cue Applause"	"Sell Out Show"	Dan Smith; Simon Racioppa and Richard Elliott	Maurice Sherwood; Mike Myhre	Blair Simmons; George Samilski	October 22, 2011
9	"Scary-Go-Round"	"Awesomely Different Drum Major"	Robin Stein	Steve LeCouilliard; Maurice Sherwood	Blair Simmons; Rev Grewal	October 29, 2011
10	"Little Shopping of Horrors"	"King of Links"	Carolyn Hay; Dan Smith	Sam To; Maurice Sherwood; Tim Packford	Blair Simmons	November 5, 2011
11	"Dental Denial"	"The Voice of Lard"	Dan Williams and Lienne Sawatsky	Sam To	George Samilski	November 12, 2011
12	"Bend It Like Burt"	"Lazy Monkey Morning"	Steve Sullivan	Christine Cunningham	Steve Sacks	November 19, 2011
13	"Thera's Awesome Date with Destiny"	"Erik the Biking"	Ursula Ziegler	Steve LeCouilliard	Steve Ball	November 26, 2011
14	"Clothes Picker-Upper of Doom"	"Nightmare on Glicker Street"	Ursula Ziegler; Philippe Ivanusic-Vallee and Davila LeBlanc	Mike Myhre; Steve LeCouilliard	Clint Butler	December 3, 2011
15	"Bad News Noam"	"You've Got Blackmail!"	Dan Smith; Simon Racioppa and Richard Elliott	Maurice Sherwood; Christine Cunningham	Logan MacPherson	December 10, 2011
16	"Me Ugh, You Awesome"	"Dancing More or Les"	Simon Racioppa and Richard Elliott	Brad Neave; Maurice Sherwood	Steve Sacks	December 17, 2011
17	"Best Frenemies Forever"	"Garbage In, Garbage Out"	Simon Racioppa and Richard Elliott; Tom Mason	Christine Cunningham; Mike Myhre	Steve Ball	December 24, 2011
18	"When Twitchy Met Tonga"	"Silent Night, Awesome Night"	Ursula Ziegler; Dan Smith	Christine Cunningham; Mike Myhre	Logan MacPherson	December 31, 2011
19	"Go Fish"	"Brat Busters"	Dale Schott; Philippe Ivanusic-Vallee and Davila LeBlanc	Steve LeCouilliard; Sam To	Logan MacPherson	January 7, 2012
20	"Don't Judge a Mutant by Its Slobber"	"Armed and Dangerous"	Richard Clark; Simon Racioppa and Richard Elliott	Maurice Sherwood; Brad Neave	Clint Butler	January 14, 2012
21	"Used Tissue of Doom"	"When Mascots Attack"	Steve Sullivan	Mike Myhre; John Young	Steve Sacks	January 21, 2012
22	"Always Be Awesome"	"Go for the Gust-o"	Dale Schott; Robin Stein	Sam To; Katrina Hadley	Dustin Mckenzie	January 28, 2012
23	"Too Many Monkeys"	"The Truth About Twitchy"	Simon Racioppa and Richard Elliott; Steve Sullivan	John Young; Katrina Hadley	Clint Butler; Steve Sacks	February 4, 2012
24	"Thera's Brother the Car"	"Mall of the Living Doll"	Steve Sullivan; Dan Smith	Mike Myhre; Christine Cunningham	Dustin Mckenzie; Steve Sacks	February 11, 2012
25	"Against All Awesome"	"Planet of the Gills"	Simon Racioppa and Richard Elliott	Katrina Hadley; Christine Cunningham	Logan MacPherson	February 18, 2012
26	"ET Phone Noam"	"Noam No More"	Steve Sullivan; Simon Racioppa and Richard Elliott	John Young; Sam To	Dustin Mckenzie; Clint Butler	February 25, 2012

== Production ==
The series was first announced as being in the early stages of development in 2005 under the initial title Team Awesome. In 2011, it was announced that Disney has joined the series as co-producer via its London-based EMEA production hub, and as such it would air on Disney XD.

== Reception ==
Common Sense Media gave the series a 4/5 star rating, stating: "Zany fun and positive social messages are great for kids."
