= Peter Ricq =

Canadian animator (born 1981)

Santillana & Peter Ricq & Matthew Fernandes
- Born: February 24, 1981 (age 45); Montreal, Quebec, Canada
- Genres: Electropop
- Occupations: Musician, animator, artist
- Years active: 2007–present
- Website: peterricq.com

Peter Ricq (born February 24, 1981) is a Canadian musician, animator and artist. Ricq is the co-creator of the animated television series League of Super Evil (L.O.S.E.). He also participated in the animated television series Storm Hawks as a junior designer. His last animated short film (Glitch) was awarded with nine best animation awards and one jury prize. He studied at Concordia University (Montreal, Quebec) in Film Animation.

He is the co-founder of the band Humans. The group is very active in Vancouver, British Columbia, where he currently lives. They are getting national as well as international attention.

His work has been exhibited in Montreal, Vancouver, San Diego and Portland and has been featured in several international magazines (Hemp, Under Pressure, CRUX), in Wallfarmers, a website dedicated on exposing new and established contemporary artists, Film library 2007 Glitch, Straight News, Sitka, I used to dream interview, Indie shuffle interview October 6, 2010, The Martlet news article October 28, 2010, Vancouver Sun article 2011, and CBC Radio One, and the basement volume 15 interview July 14, 2011.
