= Endangered Species (TV series) =

- Genre: Comedy
- Created by: Asaph Fipke
- Directed by: Andrew Duncan
- Voices of: Lee Tockar; Tabitha St. Germain; Sam Vincent
- Theme music composer: Mike Shields
- Opening theme: "Endangered Species!"
- Ending theme: "Endangered Species!" (instrumental)
- Composer: Steffan Andrews
- Country of origin: Canada
- Original language: English
- No. of series: 1
- No. of episodes: 26 (52 segments)

Production
- Executive producers: Ken Faier; Asaph Fipke; Chuck Johnson
- Producer: Asaph Fipke
- Running time: 22 minutes (11 minutes per segment)
- Production company: Nerd Corps Entertainment

Original release
- Network: Teletoon
- Release: March 3 – June 2, 2015

Endangered Species is a Canadian animated children's television series created by Asaph Fipke, produced by Nerd Corps Entertainment and distributed internationally by DHX Media for Teletoon that premiered on the channel from March 3 to June 2, 2015 and aimed for kids ages 6–11. 26 episodes were produced.

== Plot ==
The series follows Pickle, an adventurous, adrenaline-junkie yellow rabbit; Merl, a cautious but smart American red squirrel, and Gull, a lovable seagull, who live together in a stump in the middle of a park. The trio find themselves in ridiculously dangerous (and always hilarious) situations whenever they try to go about their daily life.

== Characters ==
=== Main ===
- Pickle (voiced by Tabitha St. Germain) is a fun, adventure-loving yellow rabbit who loves to go on wild adventures.
- Merl (voiced by Sam Vincent) is an American red squirrel who is cautious, strict, short-tempered, and no-nonsense, and speaks with a Spanish accent. He has a doll named Nutty Buddy.
- Gull (voiced by Lee Tockar) is a white seagull. He is slow-witted, naïve and extremely unintelligent, but lovable.

=== Recurring ===
- Schlitzy (voiced by Lee Tockar) is an evil, rotten, half-eaten corncob that was found by Gull.
- Dilly (voiced by Tabitha St. Germain) is a pink bunny who is Pickle's "cool" cousin.
- The Moles are Merl's worst fear and his worst enemy ever.
- Nutty Buddy is Merl's favorite doll.

== Production ==
The original idea for the series was conceived in 2010 and was centered more heavily around themes of environmentalism than the finished product. Among some other differences was that the character Merl was not present in the original draft, and the names and appearances of the other two main characters were different from the final version.

== Broadcast ==
In the UK, the series used to air on CBBC, where premiered on July 13, 2015. In Australia, the series aired on ABC3, where it premiered earlier on August 22, 2014.

== Episodes ==
No.	Title	Directed by	Written by	Original release date
1	"The Fast and the Furriest; Wish You Were Here"	Gino Nichele and Steve Sacks Shane Poettcker and Craig Roberts	Michael Erskine Kellie Scott Alpert	March 3, 2015
Pickle builds a racetrack in the stump. Merl insists on following road rules, while Pickle breaks all of them; Vacations-in-a-box are not as fun as they sound.
2	"Bouncing Bunny, Hidden Squirrel; Innards Space"	Dino Nichele Steve Sacks	Michael Erskine Kellie Kendra Hibbert	March 10, 2015
Gull narrates a kung fu story acted out by Pickle and they want Merl to be the villain; Gull swallows the TV remote, and Merl and Pickle pilot a shrunken sub into his insides.
3	"Raiders of the Lost Throne Room; Stump of Horrors"	Craig Roberts and Shane Poettcker Daniel DeSerranno	Rob Tinkler Edward Kay	March 17, 2015
Gull can't find the bathroom, so Pickle and Merl map the way; Merl tries to prove to Gull that the stump is ghost-free.
4	"My Best Friend Schlitzy; DAWG!!"	Steve Sacks Gino Nichele and Steve Sacks	John Derevlany John Slama	March 17, 2015
Gull's new best friend -- Schlitzy the half-eaten, half-rotten talking corn cob -- takes control of Gull and tries to destroy the stump; Pickle and Merl are terrified by a dog sniffing around the stump.
5	"10 Minutes to Cookies; Merry Garbage Day!"	Craig Roberts	Kendra Hibbert Evan Thaler Hickey	March 17, 2015
Gull finds a way to travel in time; Pickle and Gull celebrate a new holiday, Garbage Day.
6	"Flashloose Fever; FrankenStump"	Behzad Mansoori-Dara Daniel DeSerranno	Shawn Kalb John Slama	April 1, 2015
Merl bans dancing in the stump, claiming it causes too much damage, and Pickle and Gull protest; Merl spills fertilizer on the stump, causing it to start growing again.
7	"Gone Buddy Gone; Just Us League of Heroes"	Daniel DeSerranno	Stephen Senders John Derevlany	April 14, 2015
The disappearance of Merl's Nutty Buddy leads to an investigation, with Pickle and Gull as detectives and Merl as the hysterical victim; Pickle, Gull and Merl take on superhero personas, with Merl as cleaning-crazed El Sanitario.
8	"Collecting Merl; Family Fun Day"	Gino Nichele Steve Sacks	John Derevlany	April 21, 2015
Gull starts a collection of Merl's belongings; Gull finds an egg he thinks is his long-lost brother.
9	"Borderline Nuts; Gull in Tights"	Gino Nichele	Evan Thaler Hickey Kendra Hibbert	April 29, 2015
A dispute over personal space prompts Pickle, Merl and Gull to divide up the stump into different territories; Gull pretends to be Robin Hood.
10	"Mo-Squitoes...Mo' Problems; Merl's Birthday Blues"	Steve Sacks Behzad Mansoori-Dara and Craig Roberts	Andrew Harrison Kyle Hart	April 29, 2015
A pesky mosquito drives Pickle, Merl and Gull crazy, but they can't get rid of the insect; Merl is convinced his birthday is cursed.
11	"Speechless; Rear WindOW"	Daniel DeSerranno Behzad Mansoori-Dara and Craig Roberts	Kendra Hibbert Evan Thaler Hickey	April 29, 2015
Merl finds a switch that turns off Pickle's voice; An injured Merl is stuck inside and unable to warn his friends about an imminent mole invasion.
12	"Muck Raking; Size Matters, Yes"	Gino Nichele	Andrew Harrison John Derevlany	April 29, 2015
Pickle and Merl face off in the battle to end all autumn leaf battles; Merl wants to be bigger, and becomes convinced that he is a 50-foot-tall giant.
13	"Walk Around in Each Other's Paws; Hotel Merl"	Daniel DeSerranno Steve Sacks	Kyle Hart Ethan Banville	April 29, 2015
To avoid constant arguing, Merl and Pickle vow to try to understand each other better; Hoping to raise money to purchase a rare nut, Merl turns the stump into a hotel.
14	"Quality Time; Pickle Says Relax"	Daniel DeSerranno Steve Sacks	Amy Cole Josh Saltzman	April 29, 2015
Pickle makes Merl spend some quality time with Gull, but Merl may not survive the day; Pickle and Gull get Merl an automated cleaning device so that he can relax.
15	"The Basement; Gull to Sleep!"	Daniel DeSerranno Steve Sacks	John Derevlany Grant Suave	April 29, 2015
Gull goes into the basement, but doesn't return. Merl and Pickle attempt a rescue, but get trapped; Gull needs a bedtime story to put him to sleep, but Pickle and Merl clash on storytelling styles.
16	"Flying Squirrel; E.A.T.Y"	Gino Nichele Steve Sacks	Ethan Banville Josh Saltzman	April 30, 2015
Pickle and Gull discover Merl hails from a family of daredevil flying squirrels and convince him to do the greatest stunt ever; Gull finds a baby alligator, but he mistakes it for a baby alien.
17	"Hinden Stump; Pickle Productions"	Richard Johnson	Kendra Hibbert Amy Cole	April 30, 2015
Pickle and Gull convert the stump into an airship; Pickle discovers Merl's old movie script and decides to produce it with Gull's help.
18	"Dilly Comes to Town; Beard Goggles"	Steve Sacks	Evan Thaler Hickey Andrew Harrison	April 30, 2015
Pickle desperately tries to impress her frenemy Dilly when she comes to visit; Merl discovers he can't grow a playoff beard to cheer on his favourite team.
19	"Gull-Patterned Baldness; Fame and Fortune, Yuh-huh!"	Daniel DeSerranno	Grant Suave John Derevlany	April 30, 2015
A vacuum mishap leaves Gull's head clean of feathers; Merl learns that Gull was once a famous anti-pollution icon.
20	"Nutty Buddy Goes Nuts; The Fable"	Richard Johnson	Kendra Hibbert Amanda Doiron	April 30, 2015
Gull's brain accidentally flies out of his head and into Merl's favorite plush animal, Nutty Buddy; Pickle tries to disprove the fable of "The Tortoise and the Hare".
21	"Locked Out; Where No Stump Has Gone Before!"	Jeremy Brown	Kendra Hibbert Shawn Kalb	April 30, 2015
Merl leads an effort to break into the stump after Gull accidentally forgets the passcode to his new high-tech security system; Merl awakes aboard the U.S.S. Stumpterprise.
22	"Pillow Fight of the Century; Gull Proof"	Shane Poettcker Steve Sacks	Stephen Senders Shawn Kalb	May 5, 2015
After Merl is crushed in a pillow fight by Gull, Pickle trains him for a rematch; Merl attempts to Gull-proof the stump against the near-disasters caused by accident-prone Gull.
23	"Family Puzzle Night; Tub of Troubles"	Michael Dowding and Gino Nichele<hr.Daniel DeSerranno	Shawn Kalb	May 12, 2015
Pickle tries to liven up puzzle night by breaking things so Merl can rebuild them, but she accidentally breaks the whole universe into puzzle pieces; Something crazy happened in the bathtub.
24	"What a Long, Strange Camping Trip It's Been; Cage Match"	Steve Sacks Shane Poettcker	Evan Thaler Hickey Shawn Kalb	May 19, 2015
Pickle puts wheels on the stump and drives it into the woods for a camping trip; Gull brings home hordes of creepy crawly pets.
25	"Disaster Drill Disaster; Gull Goes to the Moon"	Behzad Mansoori-Dara Gino Nichele	Stephen Senders Rob Tinkler	May 26, 2015
Merl runs safety drills for every possible disaster; Pickle and Merl build a port-a-potty rocket so Gull can fly to the moon, but a butterfly pops the balloon and lands in a dump. Sea ants have a parade there.
26	"Squirrel Plague!!; Cliffhanger"	Gino Nichele Daniel DeSerranno	John Derevlany	June 2, 2015
Pickle is convinced Merl has Squirrel Plague; Pickle loves cliffhangers so much she tries to set them up in her everyday life.
