= Asaph Fipke =

Canadian producer

Asaph Fipke is a Canadian producer, writer, director, and the creator of the animated series Storm Hawks, which was made by the animation studio he co-founded, Nerd Corps Entertainment, in cooperation with Cartoon Network and YTV. He is also the creator of both the animated series Slugterra and Rated A for Awesome which aired on Disney XD and Endangered Species, which was also produced by Nerd Corps Entertainment that aired on Teletoon as well as the executive producer of the sixth and seventh seasons of My Little Pony: Friendship Is Magic, which currently airs on Discovery Family, and game show Airmageddon, which aired on CBBC.

== Career ==
Fipke studied at the University of British Columbia and the Vancouver Film School.

Fipke began his career with computer animation starting with his employment at Mainframe Entertainment, where he worked on series such as Beast Wars: Transformers (as associate producer) and Beast Machines: Transformers (as producer and supervising production designer). In addition, he worked on productions for ReBoot, the 2000 series of Action Man, the TV adaptation of Heavy Gear, Max Steel and Barbie in the Nutcracker. He eventually became Senior Vice President of Development and Production at Mainframe Entertainment in 2000, however abandoned the position in 2001.

In 2002, Fipke founded Nerd Corps Entertainment in Vancouver, along with fellow animation producer Chuck Johnson. The company's first animated series, Dragon Booster, won Fipke a Gemini Award for Best Animation Program or Series in 2005 and a Leo Award nomination in the same category in 2006.

== Filmography ==
Television Series:

- Beast Wars: Transformers (1996–1999): Associate producer and television director.
- Storm Hawks (2007–2009): Creator and producer.
- League of Super Evil (2009–2012): Creator and producer.
- Rated A for Awesome (2011–2012): Creator and producer.
- Slugterra (2012–2016): Creator and producer.
- Endangered Species (2015): Creator.
- The Deep (2015–2017): Executive producer.
- My Little Pony: Friendship Is Magic (seasons 6 and 7) (2016–2017): Executive producer.

Films:

- Barbie in the Nutcracker (2001): Executive producer.
- Monster High series (various films): Executive producer.
- My Little Pony: The Movie (2017): Executive producer.
