= Nerd Corps Entertainment =

Defunct Canadian animation studio

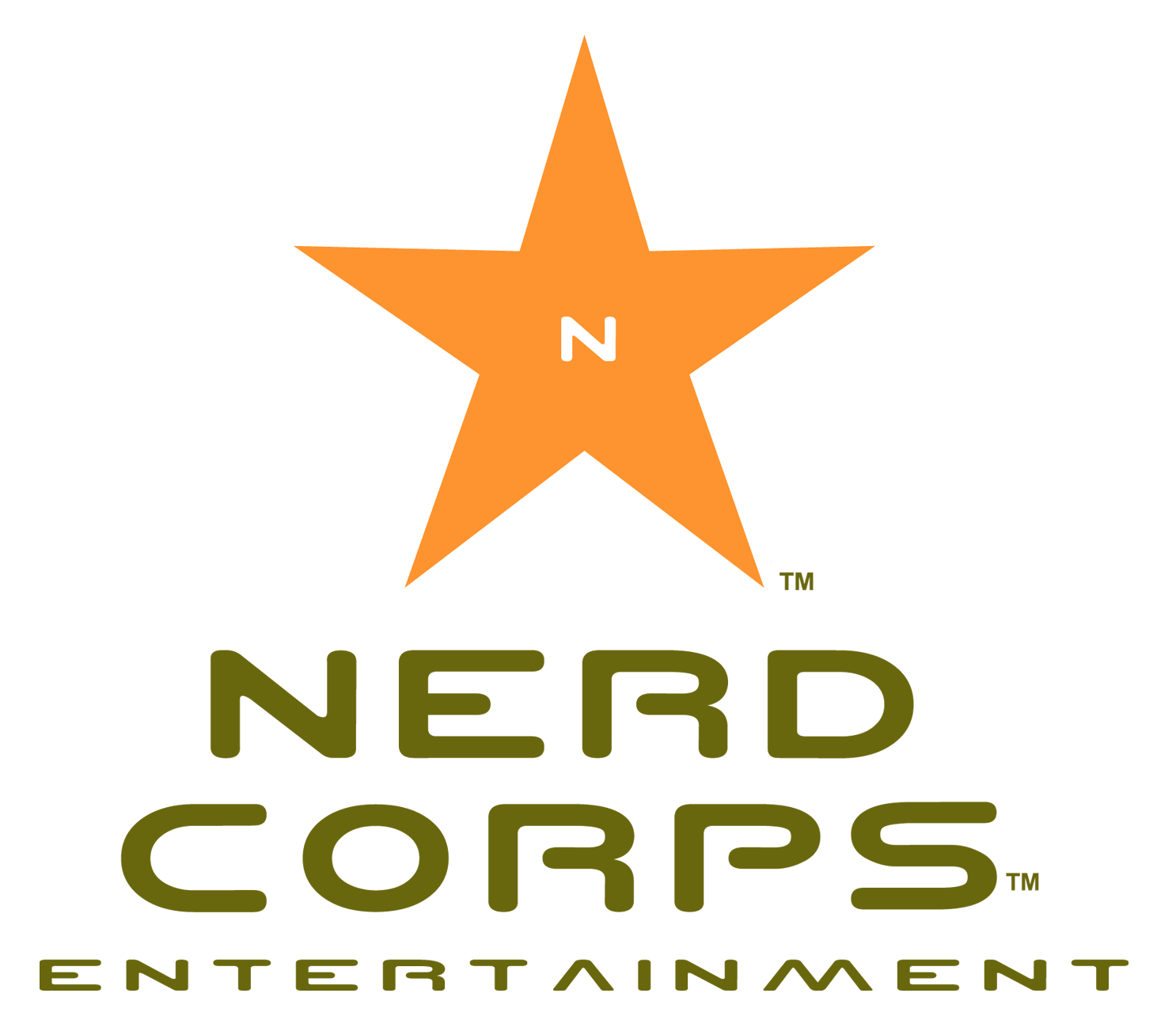
- Logo used from 2002 until 2016
- Type: Division
- Industry: Flash Animation; CGI animation; computer animation
- Founded: 2002; 24 years ago
- Founder: Asaph Fipke; Chuck Johnson
- Defunct: 2016; 10 years ago
- Fate: Merged with Studio B Productions to form DHX Studios
- Successor: DHX Studios; DHX Media (now WildBrain)
- Headquarters: Vancouver, British Columbia, Canada
- Key people: Ken Faier (president); Asaph Fipke (CEO); Chuck Johnson (COO)
- Parent: DHX Media (2014–2016)
- Website: nerdcorps.com (archived January 26, 2013)

Nerd Corps Entertainment was a Canadian animation studio located in Vancouver, British Columbia. Founded by former Mainframe Studios producers Asaph Fipke and Chuck Johnson in 2002, it specialized in CGI animation, computer animation, and Flash animation.

Aside just animation, Nerd Corps developed and produced in-house television works and produced promotional materials and creative services for merchandising and licensing partners.

It was acquired by DHX Media on December 24, 2014, who then merged it with another acquired animation studio, Studio B Productions, to form its in-house flagship division, DHX Studios in 2016.

The studio notably produced the Monster High animated films for Mattel and animated series including Slugterra, Blaze and the Monster Machines, Kate & Mim-Mim, Storm Hawks, League of Super Evil, Hot Wheels Battle Force 5, and Max Steel.

== History ==
On December 24, 2014, Canadian company DHX Media acquired Nerd Corps.

In 2016, the former Nerd Corps team was relocated to a new facility in Vancouver, which also houses the former Studio B Productions, an animation studio which DHX Media acquired in 2007.

== Productions ==
=== Television series ===
- Dragon Booster (2004–2006) (co-produced with ApolloScreen Filmproduktion, the Story Hat and Alliance Atlantis)
- Shorty McShorts’ Shorts (2006, Grungy McGee short only) (co-produced with Walt Disney Television Animation)
- Storm Hawks (2007–2009)
- League of Super Evil (2009–2012)
- Hot Wheels Battle Force 5 (2009–2011) (co-produced with Mattel and Nelvana)
- Rated A for Awesome (2011–2012)
- Slugterra (2012–2016, continued on as DHX Studios Vancouver)
- Max Steel (2013–2014) (co-produced with FremantleMedia Kids & Family and Mattel Playground Productions)
- Kate & Mim-Mim (2014–2018) (co-produced with FremantleMedia Kids & Family, continued on as DHX Studios Vancouver)
- Blaze and the Monster Machines (season 1) (2014–2025) (co-produced with Nickelodeon Animation Studio, continued on as WildBrain Studios)
- Endangered Species (2015)
- The Deep (2015–2022) (season 1) (co-produced with A Stark Production, Technicolor, Infinite Studios and BBC Children's Productions, continued on as WildBrain Studios)

=== Feature films ===
- Monster High: Why Do Ghouls Fall in Love? (2012) (co-produced with Mattel Entertainment)
- Monster High: Escape from Skull Shores (2012) (co-produced with Mattel Entertainment)
- Monster High: Ghouls Rule (2012) (co-produced with Mattel Entertainment)
- Monster High: Friday Night Frights (2013) (co-produced with Mattel Entertainment)
- Monster High: Scaris: City of Frights (2013) (co-produced with Mattel Entertainment)
- Monster High: 13 Wishes (2013) (co-produced with Mattel Entertainment)
- Monster High: Frights, Camera, Action! (2014) (co-production with Mattel Playground Productions)
- Slugterra: Ghoul from Beyond (2014)
- Slugterra: Return of the Elementals (2014)
- Monster High: Freaky Fusion (2014) (co-produced with Mattel Playground Productions)
- Monster High: Haunted (2015) (co-produced with Mattel Playground Productions)
- Max Steel: The Wrath of Makino (2015) (co-produced with Mattel Playground Productions)
- Max Steel: Dawn of Morphos (2015) (co-produced with Mattel Playground Productions)
- Max Steel: Maximum Morphos (2015) (co-produced with Mattel Playground Productions)
- Monster High: Boo York, Boo York (2015) (co-production with Mattel Playground Productions) (credited as DHX Media)
- Monster High: Great Scarrier Reef (2016) (co-production with Mattel Playground Productions) (credited as DHX Media)
