= Journey Home =

Journey Home may refer to:

== Literature ==
- Journey Home, a 1997 novel by Jennie Hansen
- Pax: Journey Home, a 2021 children's novel by Sara Pennypacker; the sequel to the 2016 book Pax
- The Journey Home, a 1945 novel by Zelda Popkin
- The Journey Home, a 1977 non-fiction book by Edward Abbey
- The Journey Home, a 1990 novel by Dermot Bolger
- The Journey Home, a 1990 novel by Isabelle Holland
- The Journey Home, a 2000 novel by Ólafur Jóhann Ólafsson
- The Journey Home, a 2010 novel by Lou Aronica under the pseudonym Michael Baron; the third volume in the Hearts of Men series

== Television ==
- "Journey Home", Meet the Wife series 4, episode 6 (1965)
- "Journey Home", Sahaya episode 23 (2019)
- "Journey Home", The Bill series 11, episode 149 (1995)
- "The Journey Home", Driving Force season 1, episode 7 (2006)
- "The Journey Home", Holby City series 15, episode 38 (2013)
- "The Journey Home", Slugterra season 2, episode 5 (2013)
- "The Journey Home", Star Blazers season 1, episode 26 (1980)
- "The Journey Home", The Adventures of Teddy Ruxpin episode 62 (1987)
- "Ulysses and the Journey Home", Mythic Warriors season 1, episode 3 (1998)

== Other uses ==
- Put Domoi, a Russian street paper
- The Journey Home: Quest for the Throne, a 1993 video game
- Journey Home (album), by Will to Power (1990)
- A. R. Rahman Jai Ho Concert: The Journey Home World Tour, by the Indian singer (2010)
- "The Journey Home", campaign two, episode 30 of the web series Critical Role (2018)

== See also ==
- The Long Journey Home
- The Voyage Home
