= The Long Journey Home =

The Long Journey Home may refer to:

== Film ==
- The Long Journey Home (1987 film), a 1987 American drama television film
- The Long Journey Home (2009 film), a 2009 Australian television documentary

== Literature ==
- Long Journey Home, a 1962 novel by Rachel Cosgrove Payes
- Long Journey Home: Stories from Black History, a 1972 collection by Julius Lester
- The Long Journey Home, a 1985 novel by Michael Gilbert
- The Long Journey Home, a 2001 novel by Don Coldsmith

== Television ==
- "Long Journey Home", Haunting Evidence season 2, episode 3 (2007)
- "The Long Journey Home", Dex Hamilton: Alien Entomologist episode 18 (2009)
- "The Long Journey Home", Nancy Drew (1995) episode 13 (1995)
- "The Long Journey Home", Super Force season 2, episode 21 (1992)

== Other uses ==
- The Long Journey Home (ceremonial event), a ceremonial event held at the main campus of the University of Washington on May 18, 2008
- Long Journey Home (Live in Liverpool), a 2006 live album by Cowboy Junkies
- The Long Journey Home (video game), a 2017 space exploration video game by Daedalic Entertainment

== See also ==
- Journey Home
- Long Way Home
- The Irish in America: Long Journey Home
- The Voyage Home
