= Showell =

Showell is a surname. Notable people with the name include:

- David Showell (1924–1955), American fighter pilot during World War II in an all-black Tuskegee Airmen squadron
- Eliza Showell (1895–1978), English-born child migrant sent to Canada in the British Home Children programme
- Frank Showell Styles (1908–2005) English writer and mountaineer
- George Showell (1934–2012), English footballer
- Jack Showell (1915–1989), Australian rules footballer

== See also ==
- Showell, Maryland, unincorporated community in Worcester County, Maryland, United States
