= Sweetnotes =

Filipino musical duo

- Origin: General Santos, Philippines
- Genres: OPM; pop
- Years active: 2017–present
- Label: Independent
- Members: Jeffrey Bactong Jr.; Charlotte Mae Bactong

Sweetnotes is a Filipino musical/cover duo from General Santos, Philippines, composed of married couple Jeffrey Bactong Jr. and Charlotte Mae Bactong. They became known locally during the COVID-19 pandemic through livestreamed performances on social media. The duo performs cover songs, often in an energetic style, and has attracted a following among Overseas Filipino Workers (OFWs).

== History ==
=== Early years and formation (2017) ===
Jeffrey Bactong Jr., commonly known as BJ, began his musical background as a church band member, while Charlotte Mae Bactong developed an early passion for singing and later worked as a vocalist-dancer in South Korea for four years. The two met after Charlotte returned to the Philippines and auditioned for a General Santos, South Cotabato based band where Jeffrey was a member.

The couple married in March 2017 and soon decided to pursue music together as a duo. Later that year, they adopted the name "Sweetnotes" and began performing using pre-recorded instrumental accompaniments, a format commonly referred to as "sequencer" performances. In the same year, Sweetnotes moved to China, where they worked as hotel performers in various locations. They were regular entertainers at the Hilton Dali Hotel Resort and Spa in Yunnan and the Cachet Boutique Hotel in Shaoxing, Zhejiang.

Although they did not gain a local following during their time abroad, the experience helped shape their work ethic as performers, as they continued to sing even on nights when there were no audiences.

=== Return to the Philippines and pandemic breakthrough (2019–present) ===
Sweetnotes returned to the Philippines in late 2019 for a brief vacation but were unable to return overseas because of COVID-19 travel restrictions. As live performances became limited, the duo began livestreaming on Facebook and uploading performance videos to YouTube.

In October 2021, a livestream of their performance of Rockstar's "Parting Time" at the Fishcaught Bar in General Santos gained wide online attention. This was followed by a rapid growth in their following. Their cover of Roel Cortez's "Iniibig Kita" later reached millions of views across platforms.

As of 2024, Sweetnotes had millions of Facebook followers and more than a million YouTube subscribers. Many of their listeners were overseas Filipino workers who listened to their music during the pandemic. They performed in the Philippines and abroad, including benefit and religious events such as the 65th anniversary of the Daughters of Saint Teresa in Cebu. Later that year, they announced a United States tour with shows in Chicago, San Francisco, New York, Los Angeles, and Hawaii, organized by Edren Entertainment LLC.

In 2025, Sweetnotes postponed several overseas engagements, including a planned performance in Kuwait, because of regional security concerns.

== Musical style ==
Sweetnotes is recognized for performing Filipino and international songs with harmonized vocals. Most of their songs are covers, but they include their own interpretation. Their approach has drawn comparisons to acoustic-pop bands such as MYMP due to the emphasis on harmony and gentle arrangements. The duo has announced plans to release original songs with themes of love, faith, and personal experiences.

== Personal lives ==
Jeffrey and Charlotte have two children. They have talked about balancing family life with their frequent travel and performances, saying in an interview with The Philippine Star that communication and support for each other are important for both their marriage and their work as a duo.

== Members ==
- Jeffrey S. Bactong Jr. (BJ) - vocals, guitar (2017–present)
- Charlotte Mae P. Bactong - co-lead vocals (2017–present)

Session musicians

- Jasper Lupian Apas - drums (2026–present)
- Ian Cors - bass guitar (2026–present)
- Paul John Tan - keyboards (2026–present)
