= Saint Canice (disambiguation) =

Saint Canice or Saint Canice's may refer to:

- Cainnech of Aghaboe (515/16–600), Irish abbot
- Mount Saint Canice, convent in Hobart, Australia
- St Canice (Parliament of Ireland constituency), former constituency of the Irish House of Commons
- St Canice's Church (disambiguation), one of several churches
- St Canice's GAC Dungiven, Gaelic football club in Northern Ireland
- St Canice's School, Westport, New Zealand
