= Slugterra =

Canadian animated television series

- Genre: Action; Subterranean fiction Science fantasy Comedy; Science fiction Western
- Created by: Asaph Fipke
- Developed by: Asaph Fipke; Rob Hoegee
- Written by: Asaph Fipke; Todd Garfield; Ken Pontac; Rob Hoegee; Scott Sonneborn
- Directed by: Johnny Darrell; Sebastian Brodin; Blair Simmons; Daniel Ife; Clint Butler
- Voices of: Sam Vincent; Andrew Francis; Lee Tockar; Shannon Chan-Kent; Mark Oliver; Brian Drummond
- Composer: Brian Carson
- Country of origin: Canada
- Original language: English
- No. of seasons: 6
- No. of episodes: 63 (list of episodes)

Production
- Executive producers: Asaph Fipke; Chuck Johnson; Ken Faier; Rob Hoegee (seasons 1–4)
- Producer: Asaph Fipke
- Production locations: Vancouver, British Columbia, Canada
- Running time: 22 minutes
- Production companies: Nerd Corps Entertainment (seasons 1–4); DHX Media (seasons 5–6)

Original release
- Network: Family Channel; Disney XD/Family CHRGD
- Release: September 3, 2012 – October 25, 2016

Slugterra is a Canadian animated television series created by Asaph Fipke. The series was produced by the Canadian animation studio Nerd Corps Entertainment, later part of DHX Media (now known as "WildBrain"). It premiered on Disney XD Canada on September 3, 2012, and started broadcasting in the United States the following month. The series was formerly streamed on Netflix from 2016 until 2018, and is currently available on other platforms such as The Roku Channel.

During its four year-run, Slugterra consisted of six seasons, six feature films, and a total runtime of 1,386 minutes, with 63 20-minute episodes. Additionally, the series also consisted of 81 minutes of Slugisodes. Several products tied to the series have been released, including both action figures and several mobile games.

== Synopsis ==
Deep inside the surface of planet Earth exists the vast underground world of Slugterra, named after the tiny Slugs who live there. Slugs are tiny little critters with supernatural powers that transform into powerful beasts when they reach velocity at 100 MPH. The Shane family are the traditional guardians of Slugterra and have kept its existence secret from the surface as they train the slugs for use as living ammunition for gun-shaped launching devices called Blasters. When a threat appears in the form of Dr. Thaddeus Blakk, a mad genius and owner of the megacorporation "Blakk Industries" who wants to transform the Slugs into feral abominations he calls "ghouls" and sends the legendary Will Shane, last defender of the 99 caverns to an unknown place, 15-year-old Eli Shane must take his place as the new guardian of Slugterra and, with the help of the slugs and his gang, stop Dr. Blakk and protect Slugterra from other forces of evil.

== Major characters ==
- Eli Shane (voiced by Sam Vincent): The series' main protagonist, Eli becomes the new Shane of Slugterra when his father Will Shane goes missing.
- Kord Zane (voiced by Andrew Francis): A huge cave troll. He is a mechanic who fixes the team's Mecha Beasts and upgrades their blasters. His favourite thing to do is play practical jokes, normally on Pronto.
- Pronto Geronimole (voiced by Lee Tockar): A proud and knowledgeable molenoid tracker. Claims to be a master rogue, slugslinger and adventurer but is known throughout the show for being the comic relief and constantly getting into trouble.
- Trixie Sting (voiced by Shannon Chan-Kent): Female vlogger and the Shane Gang's resident slug expert. Trixie's dream is to make a documentary about the slugs.
- Will Shane (voiced by Sam Vincent): Father of Eli Shane, The Protector of Slugterra
- Junjie (voiced by Vincent Tong): A hero from the Eastern Caverns and master of the art of "Slug Fu", a way of controlling fired slugs with the mind.
- Dr. Thaddeus Blakk (voiced by Mark Oliver): Owner of Blakk Industries. His business dealings and the creation of the Slugterran Express train have made him rich and powerful. His business hides his true intent: to control all of Slugterra and destroy the magical slug energy that protects it.
- Thaddeus "Tad" D. Justin Blakk (voiced by Adrian Petriw): Son of Dr. Thaddeus Blakk, who came from the surface along with his slug. Tad befriends the Shane Gang and they teach him the basics of Slugslinging.

== Episodes ==
Season	Episodes	Originally released		
Season	Episodes	First released	Last released	Network
1	14	September 3, 2012	November 1, 2012	Disney XD
2	11	February 11, 2013	March 27, 2013	Disney XD
3	14	July 1, 2013	October 19, 2013	Disney XD
4	7	March 17, 2014	April 14, 2014	Disney XD
5	13	January 17, 2016	April 19, 2016	Disney XD
6	4	October 4, 2016	October 25, 2016	Disney XD

== Slugisodes ==
From 2012 to 2016, 80 short 2D-animated episodes known as Slugisodes were aired. After a four-year hiatus, a new Slugisode, "Joules VS. Bludgeon Battle", was released on September 12, 2020.

== Slugterra: Ascension ==
It was announced that a new spin-off Slugterra series, Slugterra: Ascension, would be released, with a sneak-peek premiere on September 5, 2022. The series, consisting of 20 four-minute-long shorts, explores the adventure of Eli and Trixie against Locke and Lode. Dr. Blakk also returns in the final shorts, while Kord and Pronto only appear via radio communications. Later, a game with the same name was released in 2022.

== Telecast and home media ==
Slugterra premiered on Disney XD Canada on September 3, 2012, and started broadcasting in the United States the following month. The series was formerly streamed on Netflix from 2016 until 2018, and is currently available on other platforms such as The Roku Channel. Shout! Factory released Slugterra: Return of the Shane Gang, the first DVD collection of the series, on February 12, 2013. The second collection, Slugterra: Slugs Unleashed, was released on June 18, 2013, with Slugterra: Slug Power! following on September 17, in the United Kingdom, Platform Entertainment Ltd. released episodes on DVD.
