= Roel Cortez =

Filipino singer and songwriter (1957–2015)

- Born: Roel Corpuz; November 13, 1957; Meycauayan, Bulacan, Philippines
- Died: April 1, 2015 (aged 57); Meycauayan, Bulacan, Philippines
- Occupation: Singer-songwriter
- Years active: 1984–2015
- Spouse: Corazon Corpuz
- Children: 8

Roel Cortez (born Roel Corpuz; November 13, 1957 – April 1, 2015) was a Filipino singer and songwriter who rose to fame in the 1980s due to his Tagalog hit songs such as "Napakasakit, Kuya Eddie", "Dalagang Probinsyana", "Pinay sa Japan" and "Bakit Ako'y Sinaktan".

His other songs include "Baleleng" (Tagalog version), "Iniibig Kita" and "Sa Mata Makikita". In 1992, Universal Records released a compilation album entitled Best of Roel Cortez and later with a videoke edition of Napakasakit Kuya Eddie: Roel Cortez released on VCD in 2000.

== Musical career ==
In 1984, he had a hit song in his home country with "Napakasakit, Kuya Eddie" on the WEA Records (now Universal Records) label, which also became something of an anthem for overseas Filipino workers. By then, he had changed his surname to Cortez, and he married his wife Corazon. Through his music, he was also able to finance a Civil Engineering course for his wife at the Technological Institute of the Philippines. Together, they started 'CPC Builders', based in Marilao, Bulacan. He also found fame with his Tagalog version of "Baleleng", and with "Iniibig Kita". In 1992, he released his compilation album, Best of Roel Cortez, a compilation album containing 16 songs.

== Death ==
Cortez died of colon cancer on April 1, 2015, at 9:30 p.m., at the age of 57.

== Discography ==
=== Albums ===
==== Studio albums ====
- Napakasakit Kuya Eddie (1985)
- Tanging Pag-Ibig Mo (1986)
- Paniwalaan Mo (1987)
- Isang Iglap (1990)
- Disiplina (1996)

==== Compilation albums ====
- Best of Roel Cortez (1992)

==== Karaoke albums ====
- Napakasakit Kuya Eddie: Roel Cortez (2000)

=== Songs ===
- "Ang Mahal Ko'y Ikaw Pa Rin"
- "Bakit"
- "Bakit Ako'y Sinaktan"
- "Bakit Puso'y Nasusugatan"
- "Baleleng"
- "Dalagang Probinsyana"
- "Halika Na"
- "Happy, Happy Birthday To You"
- "Iba Ka Sa Lahat"
- "Iniibig Kita"
- "Kahit Hindi Ka Na Malaya"
- "Kahit Malayo Ka"
- "Kay Sarap Mabuhay"
- "May Tama Ako Sa'yo"
- "Napakasakit Kuya Eddie"
- "Nasaan Ka Aking Mahal"
- "Neneng"
- "Paniwalaan Mo"
- "Panyolito"
- "Pinay sa Japan"
- "Sa Mata Makikita"
- "Sa'yo Ibibigay"
- "Tanging Pag-Ibig Mo"
- "Tutulungan Kita"
- "Unang Pag-Ibig"
- "Walang Ibang Mamahalin"
