= Mount Saint Canice =

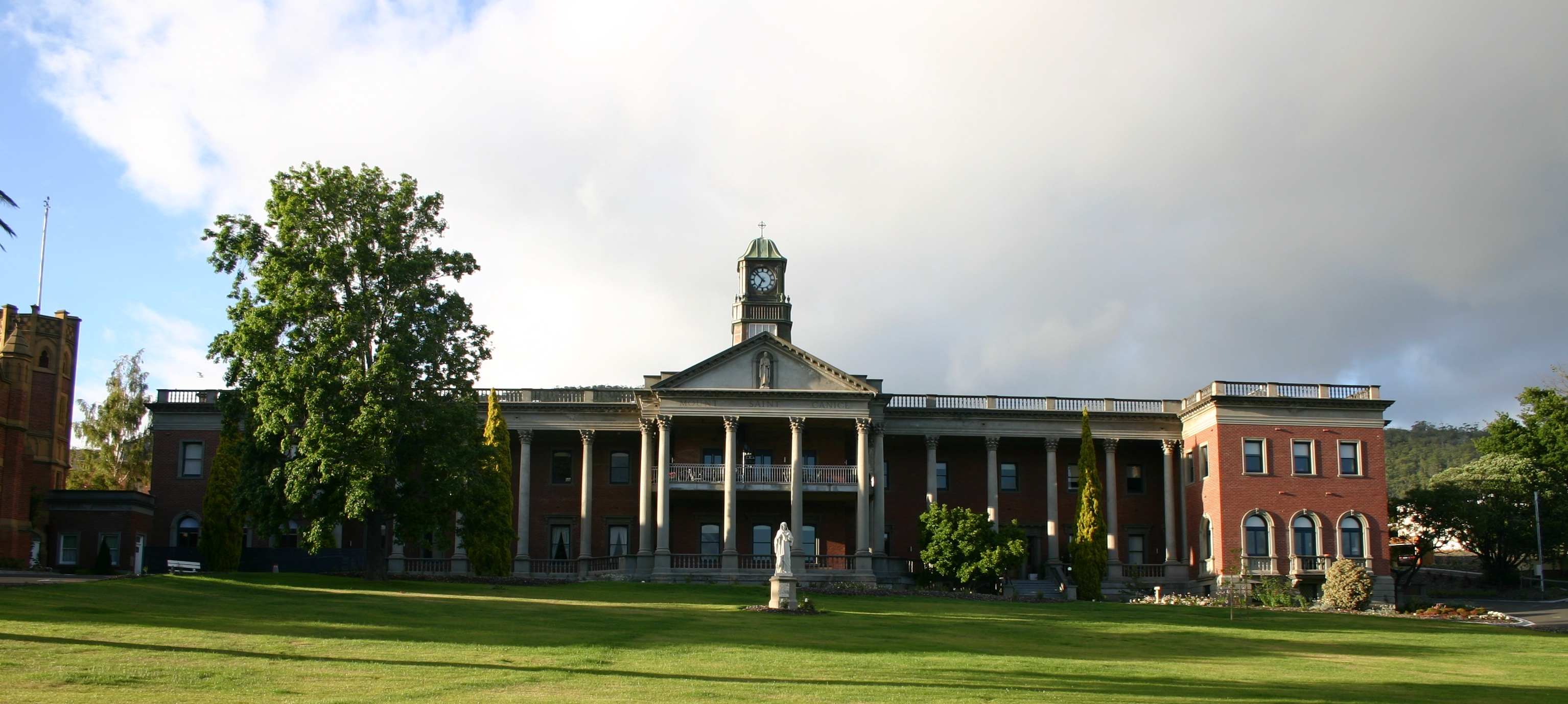
- Mount Saint Canice former convent, in 2010

- Location within Tasmania

Monastery information
- Order: Sisters of the Good Shepherd
- Denomination: Roman Catholic
- Established: 1893
- Disestablished: 1974
- Archdiocese: Hobart

Site
- Location: 15 Saint Canice Avenue, Sandy Bay, Hobart, Tasmania
- Country: Australia
- Coordinates: 42°54′47″S 147°21′01″E
- Website: scctas.org.au/location/saint-canice/

Mount Saint Canice was a Roman Catholic former convent that was located in Sandy Bay, Hobart, Tasmania, Australia and run by the Congregation of Our Lady of Charity of the Good Shepherd, commonly called the Sisters of the Good Shepherd, from 1893 to 1974.

In 1893, the sisters began to take in young women who were perceived to have fallen short of the morals and values of the times. The Mount Saint Canice convent was to become known as The Magdalene Laundry and was one of ten such laundries in operation throughout Australia. They were based on existing Magdalene laundries in Ireland. "The Magdalene Laundries were workhouses in which many Irish women and girls were effectively imprisoned because they were perceived to be a threat to the moral fiber of society."

The convent closed after four laundry workers, three engineers and a delivery driver were killed in a boiler explosion at the laundry in 1974; The building is now used as an aged care retirement home.

== History ==
Mount Saint Canice has been likened by former inmates to laundries which operated in Ireland. Former inmates of Mount Saint Canice are now referred to as Forgotten Australians. In 2009, an official Australian government apology was made to people who had grown up in the institutional system, including former child immigrants to Australia. The apology was made by the Australian Prime Minister Kevin Rudd.

Survivor and artist Rachael Romero represents her experience as a girl in a similar Convent of the Good Shepherd in South Australia and another of the commercial laundries known collectively around the world as "Magdalene Laundries." Romero's art portrays her experience in the convent, recalling her suffering as an inmate. She expresses her opinion about the Good Shepherd nun's 150th anniversary celebration.

Writer and author Merlene Fawdry gives insight into the daily operation of Mount Saint Canice in My Magdalene Home.

Janice Konstantinidis, guest author for the Australian National Museum, 28 February 2011, shares a current photograph, as well as her detailed history of her time from the age of 12 working in the Magdalene laundry of Mount Saint Canice, nicknamed "The Mag." Janice also includes recollections of the lengths some girls would go to in order to escape.

=== Sisters of the Good Shepherd ===
The Good Shepherd mother convent in Australia was Abbotsford, a commercial laundry that provided (unpaid) employment for girls and women and generated income for the Convent (1863 - 1975). The Convent was able to care for up to 1,000 and was self-sufficient through its farming, Industrial School and laundry activities.

Other Good Shepherd convents in Australia that supported themselves as industrial laundries included:

- Leederville, Perth, Western Australia, begun in 1903. A commercial laundry.
- St Aiden's, Albert Park Convent - on Port Phillip Bay, Bendigo, Victoria, first opened as a Melbourne Convent. The commercial laundry generated income for the Convent.
- Ashfield, Sydney during 1913 expanded to Toongabbie (1948 - 1961). Laundry.
- Mitchelton, Queensland 1931, industrial laundry.
- Albert Park, South Melbourne, 1892 - 1974. Industrial laundry.
- "The Pines", North Plympton, South Australia (1941 - 1974) a commercial laundry provided (unpaid) employment and generated income for the convent, under the control of the Good Shepherd Sisters and the Children's Welfare and Public Relief Board and its successors.,
- Oakleigh, 1883 - a reformatory school for adolescents in Southeast Melbourne, Victoria.

Historian Adele Chynoweth wrote about the Good Shepherd Sisters denying history: There are no precise figures for the number of girls who slaved in the ten Magdalene laundries run by the Good Shepherd Sisters in twentieth century Australia. This is because the order of the Good Shepherd Sisters has not released its records. We do know, as a result of the Australian Senate Report on Forgotten Australians that the Good Shepherd laundries in Australia acted as prisons for the girls who were forced to labor in workhouses laundering linen for local hospitals or commercial premises. The report also described the conditions as characterized by inedible food, unhygienic living conditions and little or no education. In 2008, in the Australian Parliament, Senator Andrew Murray likened the Convent of the Good Shepherd, "The Pines," Adelaide, to a prisoner-of-war camp.

Good Shepherd Australia's Province Leader, Sister Anne Manning wrote: "We acknowledge, that for numbers of women, memories of their time with Good Shepherd are painful. We are deeply sorry for acts of verbal or physical cruelty that occurred: such things should never have taken place in a Good Shepherd facility. The understanding that we have been the cause of suffering is our deep regret as we look back over our history."

Mount Saint Canice closed after a tragic fire as a result of a boiler explosion in 1974. The buildings are now occupied by a retirement complex, the Saint Canice Lifestyle Village.

State government funded redress schemes have made or are planning ex-gratia payments to Forgotten Australians in some states.
