= The Long Journey Home (2009 film) =

- Genre: Documentary
- Written by: Pasquale De Fazio Gordon Elliott
- Starring: Robert James-Collier; Andrea Lowe; Sophie Thompson
- Country of origin: Australia
- Original language: English
- No. of seasons: 1
- No. of episodes: 1

Original release
- Network: ABC
- Release: 5 May 2009

The Long Journey Home is an Australian TV documentary in which former child migrants relate their generally unhappy experiences as inmates of a Fairbridge school establishment at Molong, New South Wales. The script is largely based on an autobiographical book by David Hill, published in 2007. The documentary first went to air on ABC Television in November 2009, with Hill as one of the presenters. It included his report of allegations made by three former residents that the former distinguished governor-general Sir William Slim had sexually assaulted them and other young boys during visits to the Fairbridge farms.

== Historical context ==
The scandal of Britain's extensive deportation of children and their exploitative reception by Australian opportunistic organisations was documented and publicly raised in 1987 by British researcher Margaret Humphreys and simultaneously in Australia by Senator Jean Jenkins. The governments of both countries were slow to recognise their responsibilities in the matter but eventually issued formal apologies. The Australian apology was issued 22 years later on 16 November 2009, the day before The Long Journey Home was shown on national television.

== See also ==
Forgotten Australians
