= The Voyage Home =

The Voyage Home may refer to:

== Film ==
- Star Trek IV: The Voyage Home, a 1986 American science fiction film directed by Leonard Nimoy
- The Voyage Home (2004 film), an Italian historical drama film directed by Claudio Bondì

== Literature ==
- The Voyage Home, a 1930 novel by Storm Jameson; the second installment in The Triumph of Time trilogy
- The Voyage Home, a 1952 novel by George Blake; the fifth installment in the "Garvel" novel series
- Der sechste Gesang, a 1956 German novel by Ernst Schnabel, published in English as The Voyage Home
- The Voyage Home, a 1964 autobiographical work by Richard Church
- Star Trek IV: The Voyage Home, novelizations of the 1986 Star Trek film by Vonda N. McIntyre and Peter Lerangis
- Commander Toad and the Voyage Home, a 1998 novel by Jane Yolen; the seventh installment in the Commander Toad series
- The Voyage Home, a 2004 novel by Jane Rogers
- The Voyage Home, a 2024 novel by Pat Barker; the third installment in the Women of Troy trilogy

== Television ==
- "The Voyage Home", Manhattan, AZ episode 13 (2000)
- "The Voyage Home", The Outer Limits (1995) season 1, episode 15 (1995)

== See also ==
- Journey Home
- The Long Journey Home
- The Long Voyage Home, a 1940 American drama film directed by John Ford
- "The Short Voyage Home", Gomer Pyle, U.S.M.C. season 5, episode 24 (1969)
- "Long Voyage Home", Owen, M.D. series 2, episode 9 (1973)
