= Sahaya =

2019 Philippine television drama series

- Title card
- Genre: Fantasy drama
- Created by: Jonathan Cruz; Marlon Miguel
- Written by: Suzette Doctolero; Marlon Miguel; J-Mee Katanyag; Jonathan Cruz
- Directed by: Zig Dulay
- Creative director: Aloy Adlawan
- Starring: Bianca Umali
- Ending theme: "Baleleng" by Miguel Tanfelix
- Country of origin: Philippines
- Original language: Tagalog
- No. of episodes: 122 (list of episodes)

Production
- Executive producer: Milo Alto Paz
- Cinematography: Joseph de los Reyes
- Editors: Robert Pancho; Donald Robles; Mark Oliver Sison
- Camera setup: Multiple-camera setup
- Running time: 24–46 minutes
- Production company: GMA Entertainment Group

Original release
- Network: GMA Network
- Release: March 18 – September 6, 2019

Sahaya is a 2019 Philippine television drama fantasy series broadcast by GMA Network. Directed by Zig Dulay, it stars Bianca Umali in the title role. It premiered on March 18, 2019, on the network's Telebabad line up. The series concluded on September 6, 2019, with a total of 122 episodes.

The series is streaming online on YouTube.

== Premise ==
A disgraced Badjaw, Manisan Arati flees to Zamboanga upon learning her pregnancy to another man. She will later give birth to her daughter, Sahaya, who will develop a strong connection with the water, and will be torn between her childhood friend and a bachelor from Manila.

== Cast and characters ==
Cast

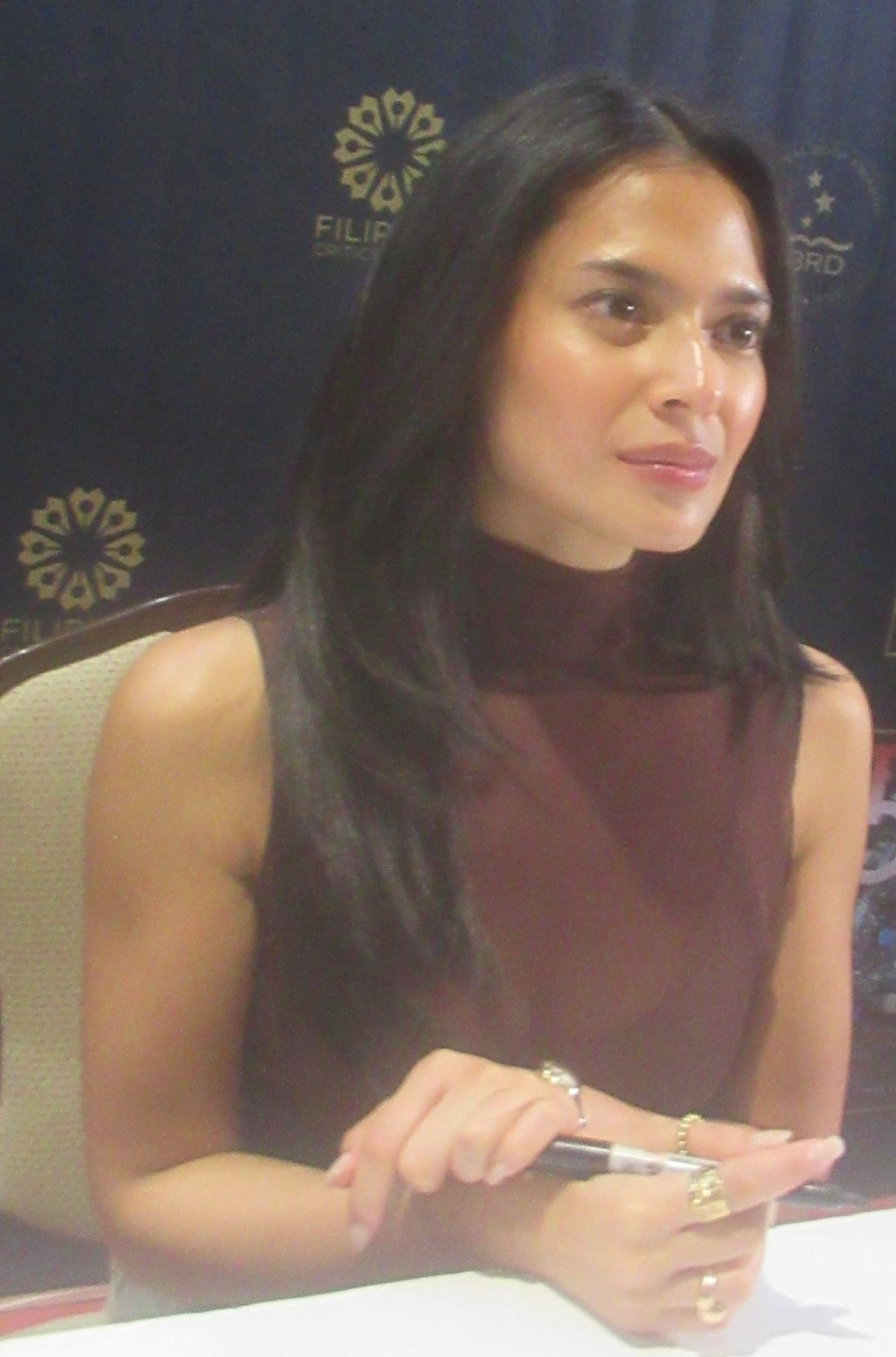
Bianca Umali

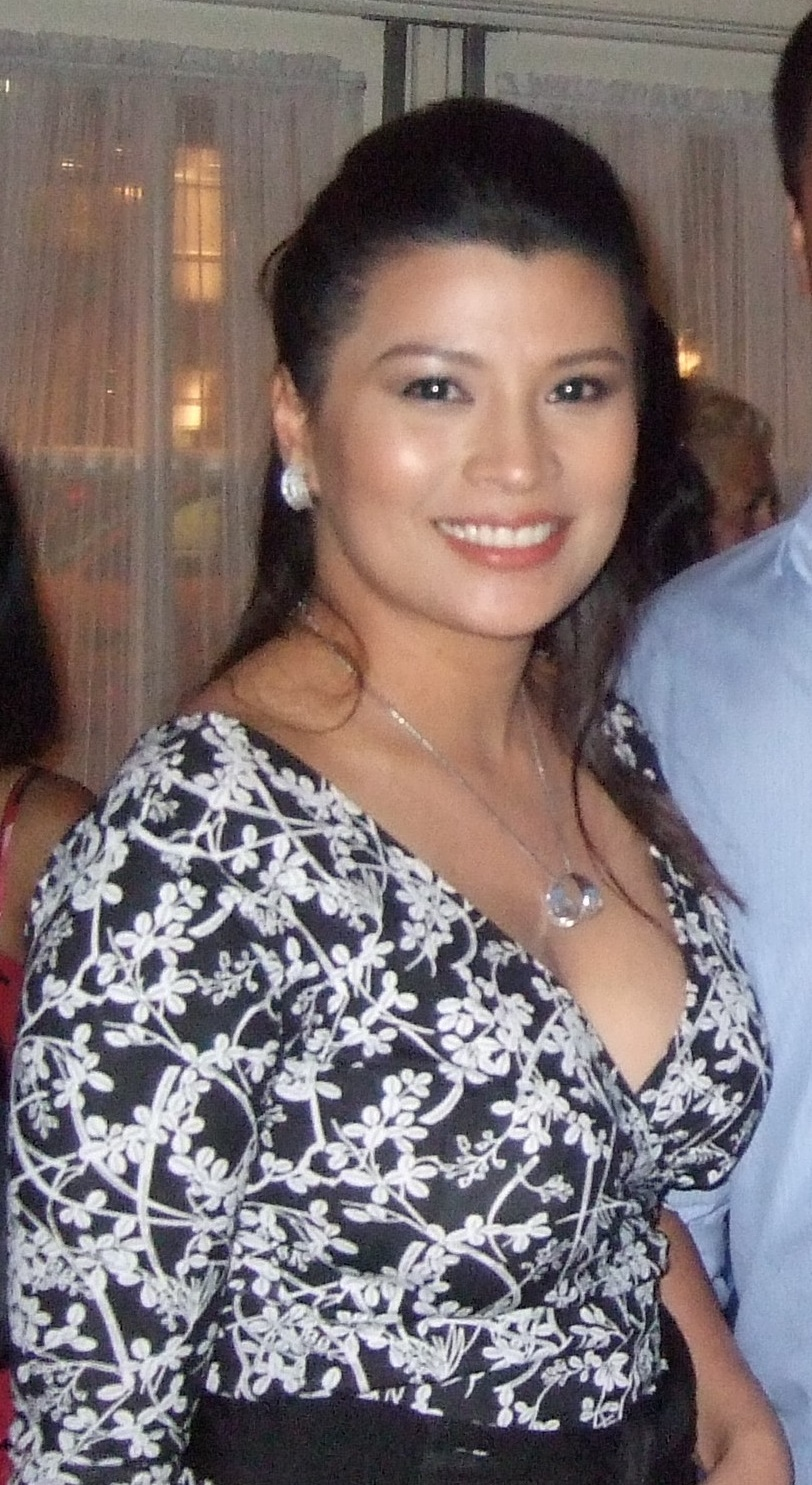
Mylene Dizon

Lead cast

- Bianca Umali as Sahaya Alari Mangayao

Supporting cast

- Miguel Tanfelix as Ahmad Kamaya
- Migo Adecer as Jordan Silverio Alvarez
- Mylene Dizon as Manisan Alari
- Eric Quizon as Hubert Alvarez
- Zoren Legaspi as Harold Mangayao
- Pen Medina as Panglima Alari Laut
- Ana Roces as Irene Alvarez vda. de Mangayao
- Ashley Ortega as Lyndsay Alvarez
- Lovely Rivero as Dapantia "Pantia" Kamaya
- Marissa Delgado as Maureen Alvarez
- Snooky Serna as Salida Saklang-Calliste

Guest cast

- Jasmine Curtis-Smith as younger Manisan
- Benjamin Alves as Aratu Calliste
- Gil Cuerva as young Harold
- Karl Medina as younger Panglima
- Angel Guardian as younger Irene
- Kyle Kaizer as younger Jordan
- Debra Liz as Babu Dalmina
- Juan Rodrigo as Bapa Armino
- Kim Belles as younger Sahaya
- Yñigo Delen as youngest Ahmad
- Glaiza de Castro as Toni
- Dave Bornea as Inda
- Ayra Mariano as Hadiya
- Faith Da Silva as Fareeda Buenavista
- Prince Clemente as Errol
- Soliman Cruz as Umbo
- Rita Gaviola as Marriam
- Francesca Taruc as Omboh Putli
- Chanel Morales as Omboh Diona
- Lui Manansala as Susana de Guzman
- Mike Lloren as Dante
- Marinella Sevidal as Beyang
- Angelica Ulip as Althea
- Empress Schuck as Casilda
- Sue Prado as Lorie
- Gina Alajar as Almida Calliste
- BJ Forbes as Arlo
- John Feir as Djanggo
- Joel Saracho as Usman
- Zonia Mejia as Flerida
- Divine Tetay as Rain
- Kleif Almeda as Pia
- Pinky Amador as Estela Silverio-del Sol
- Yul Servo as Nolan del Sol
- Froilan Sales as Noel
- Kate Nicole Mendez as Kanduray Kamaya
- Kate Valdez as Kira
- Edgar Ebro as Omboh elder

== Production ==
Principal photography commenced in February 2019. Filming concluded in August 2019.

== Ratings ==
According to AGB Nielsen Philippines' Nationwide Urban Television Audience Measurement People in television homes, the pilot episode earned a 10.2% rating. The final episode scored a 12.5% rating.

== Accolades ==
Accolades received by Sahaya
Year	Award	Category	Recipient	Result	Ref.
2019	VP Choice Awards	TV series of the year	Sahaya	Nominated	
2019	VP Choice Awards	TV Actress of the Year	Bianca Umali	Nominated	
2020	Box Office Entertainment Awards	Most Popular Loveteam for Television	Miguel Tanfelix and Bianca Umali	Won	
