= Children of Creuse =

Children forcibly moved from Réunion to France 1963–1982)

The Children of Creuse refers to 2,015 children forcibly moved from Réunion to rural metropolitan France between 1963 and 1982. It is well known in Réunion, where it is called the affaire des Enfants de la Creuse or affaire des Réunionnais de la Creuse.

== Background ==
In the 1960s, Réunion saw a rising birthrate. At the same time, the island had high rates of poverty and unemployment. French authorities feared the combination of these factors could lead to riots or other instability. The removal of children was also justified by "territorial continuity,” a concept pushed by Michel Debré, the island's MP, which called for the balancing of demographics across France’s territories.

== Forcible removal ==
Forcible removal of Réunionese children to state institutions began as early as 1954, but the children were only moved to mainland France beginning in the early 1960s. In total, 2,015 children were impacted by the program.

The children, "abandoned or not", were declared by the French authorities of the Department for Health and Social Affairs to be wards of the state. They were transported by the authorities from Réunion, in order to repopulate metropolitan departments mostly in the empty diagonal such as Creuse, Tarn, Gers, Lozère and East Pyrenees which had lost population to the movement from rural areas to metropolitan areas.

This forcible transport of children was organized under the leadership of Michel Debré, MP for Réunion at the time. DDASS officials (France’s department of social services) lied to Réunionese parents from whom they removed their children, and led them to believe that their children would experience an enviable life in metropolitan France. Some became workers, but others were unemployed.

Some were adopted, others stayed in homes or served as slave labor on the farms; the peasants across the Creuse used them as handymen or workers without wages. In addition to cases of economic exploitation, Le Monde reports cases of child abuse by the French adoptive families.

These displaced children were declared wards of the state, that is to say, the French government took away the parental rights of their birth parents; only a small number of these children were actually orphans. Hundreds of Réunionese parents were forced to sign reports of abandonment that they could not decipher, and they never saw their children again.

== Media coverage and government response ==
In August 1968, the Réunionese newspaper Témoignages denounced “child trafficking,” but the state scandal only received wider publicity in the 2000s.

In 2014, the French Parliament passed a resolution recognizing it had failed its "moral responsibility" to the children. As part of this reckoning, the French government is pursuing measures such as including the Children of Creuse in school curricula, installing memorials, and providing psychological support to the surviving children. Groups of survivors have pushed for additional measures, including a formal apology from the government, to establish a museum documenting the affair, and financial compensation.

== Reunification ==
Some of the Children of Creuse have been able to reunite with their biological families. Survivor-run groups such as the Federation of Displaced Children of France's Overseas departments and regions (FEDD) have organized trips to Réunion.

== See also ==
- Home Children, a similar program where British children were sent to colonies
