= Forgotten Australians =

Children who were in care in Australia in the 20th century

Forgotten Australians or care leavers are terms referring to the estimated 500,000 children (a figure that includes child migrants and Indigenous Australians) who experienced care in institutions or outside a home setting in Australia during the 20th century. The Australian Senate committee used the term in the title of its report which resulted from its 2003–2004 "Inquiry into Children in Institutional Care", which looked primarily at those affected children who were not covered by the 1997 Bringing Them Home report, which focused on Aboriginal children, and the 2001 report Lost Innocents: Righting the Record which reported on an inquiry into child migrants.

Children ended up in out-of-home care for a variety of reasons, mainly relating to poverty and family breakdown at a time when there was little support for families in crisis. Residential institutions run by government and non-government organisations were the standard form of out-of-home care during the first half of the 20th century. Children in institutions were sometimes placed in foster homes for short periods, weekends or during holiday periods. There was a move towards smaller group care from the 1950s and a move away from institutional care to kinship and foster care from the 1970s.

Some Australian state governments have funded redress schemes for adults who were abused in care. In 2009 an official Australian government apology was made to people who had grown up in the institutional system, including former child migrants to Australia. The apology was made by then Australian Prime Minister Kevin Rudd.

Many of these children suffered from neglect and were abused physically, emotionally or sexually while in care. Survivors to this day still suffer the effects of the child abuse. The trauma experienced in care has affected care leavers negatively throughout their adult lives. Their partners and children have also felt the impact, which can then flow through to future generations.

== Background ==
The people sometimes called Forgotten Australians are the survivors of government policies that resulted in at least 500,000 children growing up in "out-of-home" care in Australia in the 20th Century.

Forgotten Australians are also known as "care leavers". Other terms for people who spent time in out-of-home care include "homies", "state wards" or "wardies".

The majority of children in care were not orphans. Many had either one or both parents still living, or other living relatives. Children spent varying amounts of time in institutions and foster care and the majority entered care at a young age. Many spent their entire childhood and youth in an orphanage or children's home.

The Australian Senate used the figure of half-a-million when reporting on its 2003–04 'Inquiry into Children in Institutional Care'. The Senate's 2004 report on the inquiry began by saying that 'Upwards of, and possibly more than 500,000 Australians experienced care ... during the last century'. The 500,000 includes 450,000-plus Australian-born, non-Indigenous children, 30,000–50,000 Indigenous children from the Stolen Generations, and 7,000 former child migrants from Britain, Ireland and Malta.

Following a 1995 Senate inquiry into the removal of Indigenous children from their families, non-Indigenous people who had experienced out-of-home care as children called themselves the "forgotten Australians" and lobbied for similar recognition. When a Senate inquiry into child migration to Australia was being conducted in 2000–2001, the recently established Care Leavers Australia Network (CLAN) made a submission to that inquiry to raise awareness that a third and much larger group of children who had experienced care were being forgotten. A third Senate inquiry was conducted in 2003–04. The Inquiry into Children in Institutional Care 'directed its inquiries primarily to those affected children who were not covered by the 2001 report Lost Innocents: Righting the Record, inquiring into child migrants, and the 1997 report, Bringing them Home, inquiring into Aboriginal children'. The Senate reported on the inquiry in 2004, using the term 'forgotten Australians' in the report title and stating:

... children were for many reasons hidden in institutions and forgotten by society when they were placed in care and again when they were released into the 'outside' world. ... These people who spent part or all of their childhood in an institution, children's home or out-of-home care background have been the forgotten Australians.

The term Forgotten Australians is controversial. It sometimes refers to all Australian children, including Indigenous children and former child migrants to Australia who spent part or all of their childhoods in care during the 20th Century, particularly between 1920 and 1970. Not all Australians accept the term "Forgotten Australians" because of its connotations of passivity and because the label was supplied by the Senate Committee without consultation.

== Reasoning ==
Many of the reasons children were placed in care related to poverty and family breakdown. Until social change came about in Australia in the 1970s, there was almost no community or government support for families in crisis or financial need so most children whose families could not care for them were placed in some form of out-of-home care.

Family breakdown as a result of divorce, desertion, death, illness, domestic violence, drunkenness or the trauma of war led to children being taken into care or being placed in care by their own families. Few women who had been widowed, deserted or divorced could afford to raise children. Work opportunities were fewer for women than men, and women were paid less than the male wage for the same work. Lone mothers and fathers found it difficult to work to support children as there was little affordable childcare available. The social stigma of giving birth outside marriage placed enormous pressure on women to give their children up for adoption. Some chose to place their children in a home so that they could at least have some contact with them.

Aboriginal and Torres Strait Islander children were removed from their families as part of the assimilation policies of the time, and British and Maltese child migrants brought to Australian under child migration schemes spent their childhoods in institutions. Children could be made state wards by being charged with 'being neglected, of no fixed abode, [or] likely to lapse into a life of crime or vice', if authorities considered they came from homes where there was violence or alcohol abuse or if there was no-one to properly take care of them. Children with physical or mental disabilities were also commonly placed in institutions, as were children who were deemed to be 'uncontrollable'.

== Types of care ==
=== Institutional care ===
Since the early days of the British colony in Australia placing 'at risk' children into orphanages and children's homes was normal policy. During the first half of the 20th century, residential institutions were still the standard form of out-of-home care.

Institutions were run by state governments, charities, welfare and religious organisations or private individuals. They included orphanages and children's homes, as well as industrial or training schools. There were at least 800 of these institutions operating between the 1920s and the 1980s. They varied in size from large institutions housing several hundred children to 'cottages' within the grounds of an institution where smaller groups of children were cared for by 'cottage parents'.

Orphanages and children's homes in Australia 'from the 1920s to 1980s were under-resourced, poorly supervised and lacked government scrutiny'.

By the 1950s, concerns about the level of care children were receiving in institutions led to the closing down of some larger orphanages and children's homes and a move towards group care in smaller cottage and foster homes. The child protection sector became increasingly professional and accountable following changes to child protection policy during the 1970s and 1980s and there was a move away from institutionalised care towards kinship and foster care.

=== Foster care ===
Foster care in Australia began in the 19th century as a form of boarding out to give children in institutions an experience of 'normal' family life.

Care leavers reported to the Senate Inquiry into Children in Institutional Care that they had been placed in foster homes for short periods, weekends or during holiday periods. Foster care placements do not appear to have been made in a coordinated way, but 'with expediency rather than child welfare being a primary consideration'. Many reported being placed with people with limited experience of children or with older couples. Some considered they had only been fostered as a form of cheap labour to help out on farms and as domestic servants. Sexual abuse by foster parents, their children or other relatives was also reported.

== Treatment ==
Children's experience of out-of-home care varied. However, even those who made positive comments to the 2003–04 Senate Inquiry into Children in Institutional Care reported a 'lack of love, affection and nurturing'.

The Senate inquiry documented details of abuse and neglect of children in institutions:

The Committee received hundreds of graphic and disturbing accounts about the treatment and care experienced by children in out-of-home care ... Their stories outlined a litany of emotional, physical and sexual abuse, and often criminal physical and sexual assault ... neglect, humiliation and deprivation of food, education and healthcare.

Details of the mistreatment and abuse that emerged in submissions to the Senate inquiry include:

- physical assault and sexual abuse by 'carers' or other children and visitors
- inadequate medical and dental care
- unethical use as test subjects of experimental medication and drugs
- extreme physical hardship
- lack of healthy food and adequate clothing
- inadequate accommodation
- harsh and sometimes humiliating punishment.

== Long-term impacts ==
Care leavers lives have been shaped in many different ways by their time in out-of-home care. The long-term impacts are generally 'negative and destructive'.

=== Common experiences ===
Common feelings reported by care leavers include feelings of abandonment and loss because of separation from parents and siblings; a sense of isolation; feelings of guilt and self-blame; lack of confidence and low self-esteem.

Forgotten Australians reported to the Senate Inquiry that as adults they had suffered depression, social anxieties, phobias, recurring nightmares, anger, shame, and were fearful and distrustful of others leading to an inability to form and maintain relationships. Many detailed drug and alcohol dependence, homelessness, unemployment and imprisonment.

=== Loss of identity ===
The most common outcome of a childhood spent in out-of-home care reported to the Senate inquiry was a loss of identity.

Many children in care were untruthfully told that their parents were dead or had abandoned them. It was common policy to prevent parents from visiting. Parents were often told their children had been moved to other institutions or had been adopted, or that visiting rights had been withdrawn as punishment for misbehaviour. In later life, some people discovered letters on government and institution files showing that their parents had tried to make contact, or have them returned home.

Siblings taken into care together were often separated and contact between siblings was discouraged. Boys and girls were usually separated in institutions so brothers and sisters rarely had close contact. Family ties were cut when one sibling ended up in care while others remained at home with their parents or were sent elsewhere. The result is that many people never knew they had siblings or only found out much later in life. Children's names were often changed and poor and incomplete records kept of children in care. This makes it difficult for older care leavers to find out why and how they ended up in care, and to trace parents, siblings or other living relatives.

=== Poor education outcomes ===
Education for children in institutions was often of a poor standard and by the age of 15 most children had left school. Many children left institutions with low levels of literacy and numeracy that may have affected their ability to find work or meant they could only get low paying jobs. It also affected their ability to further their education.

=== Impact on partners and children ===
Most care leavers left the care system without any preparation for adulthood or parenthood. Many have carried the trauma of neglect and abuse into their adult lives and relationships but have found it difficult to tell anyone about their experiences, even partners and children.

Some reported finding it difficult to sustain relationships and many have had several partners or only transient relationships. Many care leavers found they were unable to be good parents or have chosen not to have children.

== Apologies ==
=== National apology ===
On Monday 16 November 2009, the Australian Parliament, through then Prime Minister Kevin Rudd and then Leader of the Opposition Malcolm Turnbull, formally acknowledged and apologised for the harsh treatment and ongoing trauma of Forgotten Australians and former child migrants. The apology was streamed live and broadcast on national television.

Over 900 Forgotten Australians and former child migrants were present in the Great Hall of Parliament House in Canberra to hear the apology.

=== Other apologies ===
State governments and past providers of institutional and other out-of-home care have formally apologised to care leavers who suffered or witnessed abuse or neglect while in care.

In 2009, the University of Melbourne apologised for their involvement in the unethical use of orphans as test subjects of experimental medication and drugs.

== Major reports ==
The Queensland Government commissioned an inquiry which was tabled in parliament in June 1999. The inquiry was conducted by Leneen Forde and is known as the "Forde Inquiry. It investigated abuse of tens of thousands of individuals in 159 institutions from 1911 to 1999.

The Senate Community Affairs Committee commissioned a national report on children in institutional care in 2003, specifically excluding child migrants ("Home Children) and Aboriginal children, who were the subject of previous reports. The Forgotten Australians inquiry considered the plight of more than 500,000 children in care in the 20th century and 'generated the largest volume of highly personal, emotive and significant evidence of any Senate inquiry'.

The South Australian Government's Children in State Care Commission of Inquiry (2004–2008; "the Mullighan Inquiry", after Commissioner Ted Mullighan) considered the more serious "allegations of sexual abuse and death from criminal conduct from 1910 to 2004". The resulting report (the "Mullighan Report") noted that 792 people made allegations of abuse by 1,733 perpetrators and the inquiry found "that 242 people – 124 males and 118 females – were children in State care at the time of the alleged abuse". The names of 924 children alleged to have died while in state care in South Australia were given to the inquiry. The inquiry found that 391 children had died while in state care.

All the reports considered the nature and severity of abuse and it consequences on the abused. Each report made dozens of recommendations to address the problems caused by past abuse and prevent future abuse of children in care.

== Redress schemes ==
State government funded redress schemes have made or are planning ex-gratia payments to Forgotten Australians in some states. In Queensland, payments were made in 2009 ranging from $7,000 to $40,000. In Western Australia, payments were expected to range from $10,000 to $80,000 and were to be made in 2010. The maximum payment may be limited because of underfunding. New South Wales, Victoria, and South Australia are yet to fund redress schemes. The Victorian Government position is that individual cases will be addressed on their merits. The major problem for adult survivors of childhood abuse is the burden of proof of the abuse in a formal legal setting.

== See also ==
- Bindoon, place in WA where abuse took place
- Congregation of Christian Brothers
- Institutional abuse
- Kingsley Fairbridge, founder of the child migration scheme
- The Leaving of Liverpool (TV series)
- The Long Journey Home (TV documentary)
- Margaret Humphreys, British social worker
- Oranges and Sunshine
- Protecting Victoria’s Vulnerable Children Inquiry
