= List of Slugterra episodes =

This is a list of Slugterra episodes, a Canadian animated television series created by Asaph Fipke. The series is produced by the Canadian animation studios Nerd Corps Entertainment and DHX Media.

== Series overview ==
Season	Episodes	Originally released		
Season	Episodes	First released	Last released	Network
1	14	September 3, 2012	November 1, 2012	Disney XD
2	11	February 11, 2013	March 27, 2013	Disney XD
3	14	July 1, 2013	October 19, 2013	Disney XD
4	7	March 17, 2014	April 14, 2014	Disney XD
5	13	January 17, 2016	April 19, 2016	Disney XD
6	4	October 4, 2016	October 25, 2016	Disney XD

== Episodes ==
=== Season 1 (2012–13) ===
No. overall	No. in season	Title	Directed by	Written by	Canada air date	U.S. air date	Prod. code
1	1	"The World Beneath Our Feet Part 1"	Johnny Darrell, Blair Simmons	Rob Hoegee, Scott Sonneborn	September 3, 2012	October 15, 2012	101
Will Shane is the beacon of justice in Slugterra. But when his enemy, Dr. Thaddeus Blakk, uses a corrupted slug in a duel, Will disappears. As he is sucked into the portal the slug created, before being sucken Will asks Burpy to find his young son Eli Shane and give him the letter. In the present, Eli, now 15, enters the underground world of Slugterra for the first time. From his father's hideout, he gets gear, a blaster, and a Mecha Beast, which he names "Lucky." He meets Pronto Geronimole, a proud and knowledgeable molenoid tracker, who convinces Eli to let him join his team. On the road, he meets Beatrice "Trixie" Sting, who saves him from a rogue slugslinger. When Eli enters a tournament, he meets her again and discovers that she is shooting a documentary on Slugterra. He also meets a Cave Troll named Kord Zane, who teaches him to duel. In the qualification round of the tournament, Eli duels Shockwire, a powerful slinger who uses only Tazerling slugs. When the two fight, Eli (armed with only Flopper slugs and Burpy) waits for Shockwire to overwork his slugs. When one of the Tazerlings backfires, shocking its slinger, Eli fires Burpy and wins the round. He is allowed to pick a slug from Shockwire's arsenal, but instead asks the slugs if one of them would like to join him, surprising his friends. When one of the Tazerlings agrees, Eli names him Joules and moves on to the next round of the tournament. Note: Slugs are tiny, colorful creatures with unique abilities. When they reach one hundred miles per hour (with the aid of blasters carried by slugslingers) they transform into larger, more powerful versions of themselves.
2	2	"The World Beneath Our Feet Part 2"	Johnny Darrell, Clint Butler	Rob Hoegee, Scott Sonneborn	October 8, 2012	October 17, 2012	102
Eli Shane has qualified to enter the tournament. Now, all he has to do is win. He defeats every slugslinger that goes up against him, gaining a new slug with each victory. When he makes it to the finals, Dr. Blakk attempts to give Eli a corrupted slug. Eli refuses it and tries to convince Blakk that corrupting slugs is wrong. When Dr. Blakk tries to warn him to stay out of his way, Eli reminds him that he is the Shane now. In the finals, Eli has to fight John Bull, a powerful and arrogant slugslinger. When they duel, Eli appears to be winning, but John Bull uses a "Ghoul" given to him by Dr. Blakk, and defeats Eli. Though John Bull does not take any of his slugs, Eli is discouraged by the loss. However, Trixie, Kord, and Pronto all agree to help him keep justice as the new Shane. The first thing that this new "Shane Gang" vows to do is to stop Dr. Blakk from ghouling slugs. Note: This is the first episode that corrupted slugs are referred to as "Ghouls". Eli inadvertently named them when Dr. Blakk first showed him one.
3	3	"The Trade"	Johnny Darrell, Sebastian Brodin	Rob Hoegee, Scott Sonneborn	October 15, 2012	October 16, 2012	103
The gang runs into a slinger with ghoul slugs and are defeated by him. They return home to a destroyed hideout. In order to replace all the gear destroyed at the hideout and in the battle against the slinger, they have to get new gear and a few upgrades. To buy all the gear, Eli has to trade Joules. On the way back home, Eli decides to get his slug back and goes to the shop. The Shopkeeper refuses about the refund. Eli and the gang go to the back side of the shop where they found Joules. They also ran into one of Blakk's men named El Diablos Nacho. They fight and the gang is defeated. So they head to Blakk's Headquarters to get Joules. In the process, they also free the other slugs. Eli gets Joules back and duels Blakk. As Blakk and his men were too strong, the gang escapes to the hideout.
4	4	"The Slugout"	Johnny Darrell, Blair Simmons	Scott Sonneborn	October 22, 2012	October 26, 2012	104
The gang was looking for Frostcrawler slugs. Due to Pronto's mistake, all the slugs fall and reach velocity. All the slugs transforming at the same time creates an ice hazard. The gang escapes and a Frostcrawler follows Eli. He names it Chiller. When escaping, Eli's blaster is destroyed. Kord says that only Red Hook can fix his blaster. So they go to Quiet Lawn Cavern, home of Red Hook. The Cavern is located under a bunch of Grenuke slugs which is a problem for the Cavern people. The Cavern is threatened by Billy, Shorty, and Glasses who are members of the Hooligang, the official employees of Dr. Blakk. Eli defeats Billy in a Trick Shot Competition. Billy only has a Boon Doc slug who doesn't know what it does. He thinks it useless and releases it but Eli recruits it into his team and names it Doc. Billy seeks Dr. Blakk for Ghoul slugs and returns with vengeance. Meanwhile, Eli gets a new blaster from Red Hook and faces the Hooligang. In the battle, Eli discovers that Boon Doc slugs have strong healing powers and can purify Ghoul slugs.
5	5	"Club Slug"	Johnny Darrell, Clint Butler	Eugene Son	October 29, 2012	October 19, 2012	105
The gang decides to sign up for a weekend camp called Club slug in an effort to learn a number of new moves without having to do all of the hard work. The camp director takes all their slugs except Eli's and puts them in a machine which shoots them continuously all day. Eli doesn't believe at first but when Kord's Rammstone defeats Banger (an Armashelt) he sends only Banger into the machine. But when it comes out, it looks very tired as it is losing steam' after one shot. Eli refuses to the Camp director. So he and the other slingers who have joined the camp fight the gang. In the process, Banger destroys the machine. The camp director may or may not be alive.
6	6	"The Slug Run"	Johnny Darrell, Blair Simmons	Todd Garfield	November 5, 2012	October 22, 2012	106
After watching a commercial for the Slugterra "Slug Run" Eli immediately wants to join it despite Kord's warning that the race is for experienced Mecha beast riders. As Eli and Pronto enter the cavern, Pronto sees an infamous mole called Sedo who he calls his "Life.Long.Nemesis" even though he has never heard of Pronto. Just as the race begins a new racer, Vance Volt, joins at the last second and during the race Eli both saves and gains aid from him even though Vance is working for Blakk. They both are chased by the Shadow Clan and crystal worms. They escape somehow and Vance bolt wins the race. Eli comes in second place. The reward is a rare Crytalyd slug. Only one surfaces every 100 years. Vance bolt gives it to Eli. But it is taken away by Sedo who works for Blakk. Pronto takes the Crystalyd and uses it against Sedo. The slug digs a deep hole and Sedo falls into it. Vance teaches some new moves to the gang.
7	7	"Mecha Mutiny"	Johnny Darrell, Clint Butler	Eugene Son	November 12, 2012	October 28, 2012	107
The gang is out hunting a very, very fast slug, a Hoverbug. During the chase their Mechas malfunction. Back at the hideout Kord tries to figure out what the issue is but he can't. He thinks it might have something to do with the new upgrades he got from his friends back at the forge (a factory of Mecha Beasts) so they head there to have it checked out. When they get there they find that the cave trolls that run the place have been captured and replaced by Blakk's men who are attempting to corrupt the cores of the Mechas.
8	8	"Deadweed"	Johnny Darrell, Daniel Ife	Joseph Kuhr	November 19, 2012	October 27, 2012	108
Eli and the gang enter the Deadweed cavern, an old abandoned mine shaft for Frightgeist slugs. They get ambushed by the miners who turned into ghosts by Dark Water. They discover that Blakk uses Dark Water to turn normal slugs into ghouls. They run into Nacho once again and duel him. The miners help the gang to fight Nacho. So he escapes with a large quantity of dark water. The effects of dark water wear off the miners and they turn into normal people. In the process, Eli and Trixie get Frightgeist slugs. Eli names his Spooker.
9	9	"Shadows and Light"	Johnny Darrell, Sebastian Brodin	Ken Pontac	November 26, 2012	October 21, 2012	109
The Shane gang interrupts an attack, caused by two of Dr. Blakk's employees Locke and Lode, on a shipment of Fandango slugs which are needed to revive Bullseye Cavern after the native slugs fled out of the place due to dark water. While the gang heads to the cavern, Eli learns that slug energy powers many, if not all, of Slugterra's caverns. Locke and Lode follow and cause a cave in that results in the gang traveling through Shadow Clan territory, which leads to a chase deeper into their territory (thanks to Pronto) and a face off between one of the clan and Eli trying to reason with it. Just as the Clan is ready to attack, Burpy starts chirping frantically and the Shadow Clan lets them pass, leaving Eli to wonder what did Burpy say and why did they listen to only him? After finally reaching the cavern and introducing the Fandangos to their new home, the slugs run away from something and before they could figure it out Locke and Lode make a smashing entrance. Eli and Kord face off against Locke and Lode, while Pronto hunts down the Fandangos and Trixie looks for the source of the slugs fear which is in the Bullseye. After beating the troublesome duo, Trixie informs the boys that the slugs are running from Dark Water that is seeping out from the cavern's monument so Eli asks Doc if he can handle that much to purify to which he replies with a serious and pumped look. As Doc tries to clean the Dark Water, he begins to lose steam just at that moment Pronto arrives with one fandango, which Trixie says is enough to give Doc a boost and it does! Now the Dark Water is purified and the Fandangos and native slugs finds some new places to roost, the gang wonders how many other caverns are starting to be infected with Dark Water and what ever happened to Locke and Lode. Locke and Lode ran to regroup and question if they should now inform Blakk, just when Shadow Clan arrive and chase them.
10	10	"Mario Bravado"	Johnny Darrell, Daniel Ife	Todd Garfield	December 3, 2012	October 29, 2012	110
Pronto gets captured for spitting out gum in a part of town that it is illegal to do that so the gang tries to free Pronto and the rest of the prisoners who were punished unjustly, but to do that they need to land a crazy trick shot. The first try fails miserably, but Kord remembers a master trick shooter named Mario Bravado who ran into Doctor Blakk and bet into quitting trick shooting forever and lost, therefore he never did another trick shot again, they found him working in a Pizzeria called Ricochet Pizza because he uses his slug to ricochet off different things to make the pizza. Eli tries to persuade him into helping them with a master trick shot to free Pronto and the rest, but instead Mario decides to teach Eli how to trick shoot by making pizza's and ricocheting the slug off different things to make the pizza, he eventually gets it and Mario joins him. Eli finds out that Pronto is on a speeding train heading into a tunnel and has to separate Pronto's wagon from the main express. Eli does a really good trick shot and he switches the path of Pronto's wagon, but it leads to a dead end and Mario does a crazy trick shot and frees all the prisoners and opens the wagon and all, but Pronto didn't make it and is falling to his death when Eli trick shoots a slug that catches Pronto and he lives. Mario goes back to his Pizza job again and Eli thanks him and offers him a place in the team. But Mario said "not now".
11	11	"Dawn of the Slug"	Johnny Darrell, Blair Simmons	Ken Pontac	December 7, 2012	October 29, 2012	111
The gang is very tired in enforcing Slugterra. So the gang head for a mall to relax, play games, and buy a new bag for Pronto. When they arrive, they are chased by zombies. They are aided by a mall slinger and try to find the cause for zombies in the mall. Pronto is taken to Mr. Saturday by the zombies. He is also turned into a zombie by Mr. Saturday who uses a Cryptogriff (Ghouled Hypnogriff). The gang defeats him and the Cryptogriff is cured by Doc. All the zombies including Pronto return to their original state. Mr. Saturday is sent to mall jail.
12	12	"Undertow"	Johnny Darrell, Steve Ball	Jonathan Callan	December 10, 2012	October 30, 2012	112
While riding through the mystifying Flumes, a river that flows beneath Slugterra, the Shane Gang end up in Undertow, a water filled cavern. Before they can relax they run into Pirate Captain Malvolio Drake, Master of the Cavern Seas. The Shane Gang gets captured and have to rely on Dr. Blakk's men to break them out. They manage to out pirate Drake and his Mimkey Slug, a slug that perfectly mimics anything another slug slung at it can do. Eli liberates all of Drake's captured slugs and return them back to their rightful owners.
13	13	"Endangered Species"	Johnny Darrell, Sebastian Brodin	Mark Hoffmeier	December 14, 2012	November 1, 2012	113
On a very slow and painful day (thanks to Pronto's home cooking) Trixie talks the gang into a slug hunt for the rare and near-extinct Enigmo slug. As they arrive they find out that they aren't the only ones hunting for the Enigmo, minus one couple waiting to simply buy it. Eli and his gang try to talk the other hunters to stop cutting down the forest because it is also destroying the other native slugs habitat, they agree that cutting it down is a bad idea and decide to simply smoke the Enigmo out with Flaringos. During the fight between them, Eli stumbles onto a deadly slug trap and a slug about to fall in it! Eli quickly saves it and returns to the dueling area to tell the hunters off for how dangerous their traps are and how the slug was almost seriously hurt. To Eli's surprise Trixie reveals that the slug he saved is the Enigmo, at that moment the true owner of the trap, a feared slug hunter named Stocker, who demands the Enigmo and the trap back. When Eli refuses a shoot-out between the gang, Stocker and his slughounds ensues with Eli using the Enigmo and getting hit by it in a backlash, Trixie saves Eli and asks what did the Enigmo look like when it transformed to which he replies he wouldn't know cause his vision became distorted. Now the gang must find the slug, evade Stocker and his hounds and guide Eli around, during the hunt for the slug each member tries to save it from one trap after another since it seems to enjoy playing near or on them. Kord gets shot with a hundred slug tranquilizes, Trixie is caught in a cage and Pronto gets caught in a pit trap (ironically) leaving Eli to face off against Stocker and his hounds solo. After pulling off some good evasive maneuvers and using Chiller and Spinner to swing away from the hounds only to crash and get cornered by Stocker, who now has the Enigmo. With Eli keeping him busy, Burpy talks one of Stockers slugs to switch with the Enigmo and Stocker hits Eli with the slug and fix his vision. When they duel a second time, Burpy hits Stocker, knocking him back into one of his own cages. Eli and Burpy find their friends and start to ride home.Pronto "accidentally" leads them back to the rich couple where they ask Eli how much he wants but Eli declines since it was such hard work just trying to save him, let alone catch him. So they head back to their Mechas with Pronto still trying to convince Eli to sell the Enigmo.
14	14	"The New Kid Part 1"	Johnny Darrell, Clint Butler	Ken Pontac	February 2, 2013	February 11, 2013	201
The gang is chasing one of Blakk's grunt when suddenly they get ambushed by many of them. They are saved by a new kid named Twist. He owns a Thuglett slug named Loki. They find one of the ghoul slugs storage area. Loki gets disguised as a ghoul slug and enters the facility. They get control over all the CC cameras to make their operation easier. They all disguise as Blakk's grunts and take away all the ghouls. El Diablos Nacho spotts them and chases them. They escape and with Doc's help, they cure all the ghouls. It is revealed that Twist works for Dr. Blakk.

=== Season 2 (2013) ===
No. overall	No. in season	Title	Directed by	Written by	Canada air date	U.S. air date	Prod. code
15	1	"The New Kid Part 2"	Johnny Darrell, Craig Roberts	Jonathan Callan	September 2, 2013	September 6, 2013	202
Along with Twist, the Shane Gang plan to rob a train carrying the last of Dr. Blakk's Dark Water. They work out the plan and are trapped by Diablos Nacho. Kord realises that Twist works for Dr. Blakk and warns Eli. While in the fight, Twist traps Eli and duels him. He tells that he is an orphan because of Will Shane. When Eli has the advantage in the duel, he escapes. In the end, Dr. Blakk replaces El Diablos Nacho with Twist.
16	2	"Snowdance"	Johnny Darrell, Sebastian Brodin	Guy Toubes	September 9, 2013	September 13, 2013	203
While watching a drive-in movie at Snowdance Cavern, the Shane Gang get into a fight with the Hooligang, and in the heat of the battle they awaken an Ice Ogre which increases in size when angered. Eli surrenders the duel to avoid causing a cave in. Eli saves the Manager of the Theatre (a molenoid) who advises him to use the Slyren slug which can put the Ice ogres back to sleep. Meanwhile, Trixie uses Billy to stop the Ice ogre by telling him that he has a talent for acting in movies. Eli finds the nest of the Slyren slugs (Almost falling to his doom in the process) and asks the slugs for help. But when the whole nest stops singing it awakens the rest of the Ice ogres. Eli uses the Slyren and puts the ice ogres to sleep.
17	3	"Inheritance"	Johnny Darrell, Barry Karnowski	Todd Garfield	September 16, 2013	September 20, 2013	204
Dana Por, the daughter of Will Shane's old partner, Tom Por comes looking for treasure that she believes Will had hid from her father. She searches the hideout at night for the treasure, but Eli and the slugs spot her. After a quick scuffle she mentions a hidden treasure and leaves. The gang enthusiastically search for the treasure in the hideout when Eli finds a safe behind a photo frame. The safe holds a chest encased in a layer of molten magma called Smolten. Only the Forgesmelter can melt the chest. The gang search for the Forgesmelter in Magma Caverns. Dana Por gets to the nest before them and scares off the Forgesmelters leaving only one. She reveals that Will Shane had told her father of a treasure and promised to split it with him, but her father was ultimately betrayed. Eli offers to share the treasure with her, and they open the chest to find it is only filled with everyday objects. Dana finds a device and wears it thus, summoning the Shadow Clan. The gang escapes while Eli tries to lead the shadow clan away. When he reaches a dead end, Burpy asks Eli to wear the device. The Shadow Clan's leader tells Eli that he is wearing a Shadow Talker, a circuit that allows him to communicate with the Shadow Clan. When the Shadow Clan's leader finds out the Eli is a Shane, he tells him that he is not ready to handle the device's full power but allows him to keep it until he is ready to use it. Eli tells the gang about the Shadow Talker. Dana disappears with a second device she'd taken from the chest.
18	4	"A Distant Shore"	Johnny Darrell, Clint Butler	Jonathan Callan	September 23, 2013	September 27, 2013	205
With the help of a journal (written by Eli's great-uncle) a ridiculed adventurer plans an expedition to "The Burning World' (i.e. the surface) He tells a crowd that all who believe him should meet him the next day. Eli hears about this and wants to go to stop him. When sneaking out from the hideout, Trixie and Kord spot him. The gang realize where Eli is going, but misunderstand his reasons for going and decide to go with him. When the gang arrives, the adventurer is excited that Eli wants to be a part of the expedition, but the gang is upset that Eli will not tell them why he needs to go. The gang returns to the hide-out while Eli manages to steal the journal. The adventurer and a group of slingers chase Eli back to the hide-out. Eli reveals that the burning world is real and (after some assurance) The gang duels the group of explorers. In the middle of the battle Kord is taken hostage and as a last resort Eli burns the journal using Burpy. The adventurer leaves after being called a fraud. Eli then reveals to the gang that he came from the surface and shows them the tunnel through which he came to Slugterra.
19	5	"The Journey Home"	Johnny Darrell, Craig Roberts	Ken Pontac	September 30, 2013	October 4, 2013	206
Locke and Lode, while trying to deliver a package to Dr. Blakk are yet again stopped by the Shane gang. After the battle Eli's slugs (except for Glimmer and Suds) head back to the hide-out but are stopped along the way. As they try to make their way home Eli agrees to a duel with Much (monster that is eating all the food in the cavern's restaurants). Eli sends Trixie and Kord to retrieve the slugs from the hideout, thinking they would be there while he duels Munch with only two slugs. While this happens Burpy and the other slugs encounter some complications on the way home that ends with them stealing an elephant Mecha beast. In the end Eli's slugs come through and help him get rid of the big fat problem.
20	6	"Roboslugs"	Johnny Darrell, Sebastian Brodin	Ken Pontac	October 7, 2013	October 11, 2013	207
Quentin, a mad scientist was experimenting with Roboslugs, a new generation of slugs which has the abilities of all the slugs of Slugterra. He was running mad using the Roboslug in the town. So his sister ringed to the Shane gang to seek help from them. They end up with him in a duel in which Eli defeats him using the Enigmo slug. This was because Enigmo was a rare one and only a few people have seen it transform. As a result, Quentin didn't know about the abilities of Enigmo slug. He flees and returns with a giant robot and defeats them. Proud that he has defeated the Shane gang, he leaves the place. After the duel, his sister tells him about her brother's flashback that when he was a young boy, he went to a field trip with his family when his brother tried to get rid of him and pushed him into a room filled with slugs. Due to this incident, he developed a phobia on slugs. So he made the Roboslug to replace them with the original slugs. Then Eli plans to face Quentin using a giant robot they make using their Mecha beasts. Quentin has the advantage in the fight as he was using the Roboslugs. The Shane gang's robot was losing all its parts and collapsed. Eli and Quentin were about to start a duel when Quentin's brother and sister threw a bunch of slugs at him. He started running about in the place when Eli shot a Flopper slug named Noodle at him. Noodle saves him by ordering the slugs to save him from his robot when it was falling on him. He develops a liking on Noodle and resists his phobia. He was sent to jail when Dr. Blakk offered him an opportunity to join him and give his Roboslugs for ghouling. Quentin accepts the opportunity.
21	7	"The Unbeatable Master"	Johnny Darrell, Barry Karnowski	Paul Giacoppo	October 14, 2013	October 18, 2013	208
Shinai, The Unbeatable Master of slug slinging has a fight in a hotel and demands Eli come to her. The Shane gang arrive and after introducing herself Trixie mentions that she is the unbeatable master. She then leaves the hotel after telling Eli to meet her the next day to find out if he is worth training. The very same night, the gang talk about her and how she trains Shanes. Eli is very eager to be trained and leaves early in the morning. He is surprised to see a lot of slingers who wanted to get trained (Including Trixie, Kord and Pronto). She holds a competition in which the majority of slingers are disqualified. When some slingers refuse to leave, she performs the legendary fusion shot using her slugs, Ping and Yang and throws them out. The remaining Slingers must duel in a one-on-one tournament and whoever wins gets trained by the master. Eli and another slinger make it to the finals before the mystery slinger reveals himself as Twist in a disguise. An hour before the finals, Eli tells her that Twist shouldn't be trained by her. She tells Eli that Will Shane and Blakk came to her 30 years prior and chose to train Will leading Blakk down his Ghouling path. Shinai confides in Eli that she thinks maybe Blakk needed her guidance more because Will would have been a great Shane no matter what. Eli is concerned that she will choose to train Twist because of this guilt and vows to beat Twist. Just as Eli and Twist are about to duel, Blakk arrives with some soldiers, a bull Mecha and a new Gattler blaster. Sinai duels Blakk, Eli duels Twist, and the gang duels the soldiers. When Twist is defeated, he flees but disguises himself as Blakk to keep Shinai busy. When Shinai defeats him using the fusion shot and the disguise wears off, the real Blakk fires a Goon Doc (Ghouled Boon Doc) at her from behind. The shot is fatal and when she passes she and her slugs disappear. Eli uses her blaster and defeats Blakk by performing a fusion shot with Burpy and Joules. Blakk leaves, and the gang hold a small funeral.
22	8	"Deep Water, Dark Water"	Johnny Darrell, Clint Butler	Todd Garfield	October 21, 2013	October 25, 2013	209
Eli and his gang have to join forces with Captain Malvolio Drake to stop a drill in Undertow cavern.
23	9	"The Gentleman and the Thief"	Johnny Darrell, Craig Roberts	Scott Sonneborn	October 28, 2013	November 1, 2013	210
Dana uses the Shadow Walker she stole from the treasure chest to teleport from one place to another and becomes a thief. She steal things from everyone, even Trixie's camera. Unaware of the consequences, she steals Blakk's blaster. So Blakk appoints the Gentleman to get his blaster back and get Dana alive. Gentleman is an experienced slinger who uses Geoshard slugs to crystallize his opponent. Knowing this, Eli tries to save her from the gentleman. The gang blackmails him to change sides and Eli comes up with a plan to prevent Blakk from chasing Dana. When Blakk confronts Eli upon request, they duel. Blakk backs out on his agreement and reveals the gentleman. Eli then brings Dana who acts as his backup. However, the gentleman corners Dana and shoots her in such a way that she doesn't get crystallize completely when hit with the Geoshard slug. The crystallized Dana falls into a rivet caused by Eli and Blakk's dueling. Eli saves her and escapes. She gets cured using Pronto's Slyren. Eli thinks that the Shadow Clan device will be safe with Dana.
24	10	"No Exit"	Johnny Darrell, Sebastian Brodin	Guy Toubes	November 4, 2013	November 8, 2013	211
Lumino Cavern has been invaded by a swarm of Neurotox ghoul slugs that have created a toxic cloud that is attacking the residents. The Shane Gang must brave an inescapable maze to locate Blite, the only man who can help them.
25	11	"The Hard Part"	Johnny Darrell, Barry Karnowski, Blair Simmons	Alexx Van Dyne	November 11, 2013	November 15, 2013	212
Eli and Kord have been trying to create a fusion shot which consists of two slugs being shot at the same time using both of their powers. In order to make it work, they will need to travel to Scrap Heap, a junk yard cavern protected by Boss Ember and his Scrap Force and in the end Eli gets an Xmitter slug which can disable any electrical device like an EMP.

=== Season 3 (2013–14) ===
No. overall	No. in season	Title	Directed by	Written by	Canada air date	U.S. air date	Prod. code
26	1	"What Lies Beneath"	Johnny Darrell, Clint Butler	Rob Hoegee	November 18, 2013	November 22, 2013	301
The Shane Gang are chased to the great chasm where they meet a Shadow Clan member who reveals that the dark forces trapped beneath Slugterra are posing a grave threat to the entire world and are trying to break out. Eli and the rest of the gang volunteer to stop the dark forces.
27	2	"The Return"	Johnny Darrell, Craig Roberts	Todd Garfield	November 25, 2013	November 29, 2013	302
Eli tries a fusion shot on Dr. Blakk's unstoppable train but he uses the wrong slugs and shorts out his gang's slugs. The Shadow Clan confront Eli and teach him how the Enigmo slug has the ability to allow the Slugslinger to see a slug's aura. Eli, learning more about the double-barrel fusion shot, confronts Blakk's Gattler and destroys his new Slugterran Express train, Blakk Steel.
28	3	"Slugball"	Johnny Darrell, Sebastian Brodin	Jonathan Callan	December 2, 2013	December 6, 2013	303
Kord's troll friends compete in the Slugball but when they are injured, it's up to the Shane gang to find out why the battle field is infested with high-tech traps, and come out victorious.
29	4	"King of Sling"	Johnny Darrell, Blair Simmons	Ken Pontac	December 9, 2013	December 13, 2013	304
The King of Sling finds himself in way over his head when Locke and Lode take over his home cavern and it's up to the Shane gang to help him win it back from Dr. Blakk.
30	5	"Mission Improbable"	Johnny Darrell, Clint Butler	Steve Sullivan	December 16, 2013	December 20, 2013	305
Pronto and Burpy must save The Shane Gang from Stalagmite 17, the most impregnable prison in all of Slugterra. However, they will have to fight their way through Mr. Saturday and his army of Zombified Guards to do it.
31	6	"Keys to the Kingdom"	Johnny Darrell, Craig Roberts	Joseph Kuhr	December 23, 2013	December 27, 2013	306
The Shane Gang has to find a map of Slugterra that reveals every secret thing in SlugTerra before Diablos Nacho gets it.
32	7	"The Thrill of the Game"	Johnny Darrell, Sebastian Brodin	Alexx Van Dyne	January 6, 2014	January 10, 2014	307
The Shane Gang must use every bit of skill they have when they are lured into an elaborate game by a Twisted villain calling himself the Game Master.
33	8	"Lightwell"	Johnny Darrell, Daniel DeSerranno	Eugene Son	January 13, 2014	January 17, 2014	308
Burpy is very sick and Eli has to take him to the Lightwell with the help of his slugs.
34	9	"It Comes by Night"	Johnny Darrell, Clint Butler	Jonathan Callan	January 20, 2014	January 24, 2014	309
When a mysterious creature begins draining the energy from all the slugs in a distant cavern, the residents offer a rich reward to whoever can stop it.
35	10	"Upgrade"	Johnny Darrell, Craig Roberts	Guy Toubes	February 3, 2014	February 7, 2014	310
The Shane Gang must transport a captured Dr. Blakk to Stalagmite 17 with their new transforming Mecha Beasts. But Dr. Blakk's new super vehicle, the Titan will not make it easy for them. Eli also discovers a newfound strong power within the slugs: Mega Morphing.
36	11	"Back to Blakk"	Johnny Darrell, Sebastian Brodin	Rob Hoegee	February 10, 2014	February 14, 2014	311
While his henchmen attempt to spring him from prison, Blakk tells Eli his life story and describes his rivalry with Will Shane.
37	12	"Bandoleer of Brothers"	Johnny Darrell, Daniel DeSerranno	Ken Pontac	February 17, 2014	February 21, 2014	312
Seen through the eyes of the slugs, the Shane Gang must liberate a cavern with help from the newest member of Eli's team, a Blastipede slug named Rookie.
38	13	"Dark as Night"	Johnny Darrell, Dustin McKenzie	Todd Garfield	February 24, 2014	February 28, 2014	313
Dr Blakk finds a way to make his ghouls stronger thanks to a special device. Hoping to find a counter-measure, the Shane Gang looks for Red Hook. Entering Quiet Lawn, they instead encounter Twist and Blakk's men. Eli enables his friends and slugs to escape, but gets captured by Twist and El Diablos Nacho. While escaping from imprisonment in Blakk's base, Eli soon finds Red Hook, willingly working for Blakk by making the device. Red Hook upgrades Eli's blaster by fitting one of the devices onto it, enabling them to escape with Red Hook's newest gizmo, the Accelerator.
39	14	"Light as Day"	Johnny Darrell, Craig Roberts	Scott Sonneborn	March 3, 2014	March 7, 2014	314
The Shane Gang assault Dr Blakk's stronghold while Pronto is given the mission to contact the Shadow Clan in order to repel Dr. Blakk and the Darkbane once and for all. When Eli, Trixie, and Kord arrive they find Blakk and his goons waiting outside. Eli charges in to destroy the Terraportal but already finds it active and is forced to duel Blakk one on one while Trixie and Kord duel everyone else outside. However the gangs blasters can only handle Mega Morph energy before a cooldown and suffer defeat due to Blakk and the Darkbane not having this handicap for some reason. Nacho damages Kord's Mecha Beast causing him to go in a rage resulting in a brawl, leaving Trixie to duel the rest of the Darkbane alone. Meanwhile Eli gets shot through a wall and separated from his accelerator upgrade. He responds with a Fusion Shot that miraculously defeats a Megamorph however the Terraportal is almost finished. Trixie loses her blaster and is forced to use Kord's and literally gets knocked off her feet due to the recoil. Pronto arrives with the Shadow Clan, defeats the Darkbane and everyone charges into the portal room for a last stand. The portal is finally complete and the Darkbane army teleports through. In the battle Pronto remembers that he also brought Doc (the guardian healer slug last seen in "What Lies Beneath") as well and Eli uses him to shut down the machine. Doc's powers actually puts the machine in reverse sucking all of the Darkbane back to the Deep Caverns and Eli and Blakk get sucked in as well. The Shadow Clan Leader attempts to shut down the portal by jamming the gears while Eli and Blakk continue fighting on the trip down. Eli escapes riding on Burpy and the Shadow Clan thank the Shane Gang for stopping Blakk and the Darkbane. The episode closes at the Drop to the Surface where the gang think Eli is leaving but instead he uses Burpy to seal the entrance just before Blite appears riding on a dinosaur.

=== Season 4 (2014) ===
No. overall	No. in season	Title	Directed by	Written by	Canada air date	U.S. air date	Prod. code
40–41	1–2	"Slugterra: Ghoul from Beyond (2 Parts)"	Logan McPherson, Johnny Darrell, Barry Karnowski	Scott Sonneborn	March 17, 2014	March 21, 2014	TBA
After defeating Dr. Blakk and the Darkbane, Eli and his crew believe all is well. But it's not long before they face off against a new threat: Strange Marauders, a Dark Slinger and an evil Goon Doc slug with powers of Mind Control and Ghouling. The Goon wishes for Slugterra to be returned to the slugs. But the Shane Gang will stop at nothing to defeat the Goon and restore peace to the caverns.
42–44	3–5	"Slugterra: Return of the Elementals (3 Parts)"	Logan McPherson, Johnny Darrell, Daniel DeSerranno, Behzad Mansoori-Dara, Steve Sacks	Guy Toubes, Jonathan Callan and Ken Pontac	March 31, 2014	April 4, 2014	TBA
A new member has joined the Shane Gang. Junjie, the protector of the Eastern Caverns and a master of the mysterious slugslinging art of Slug Fu. But even with the power of five slugslingers working together, the Shane Gang find themselves in over their heads as they race to protect the 5 ancient Elemental Slugs from an evil alliance set upon using them to destroy all of Slugterra.
45–46	6–7	"Slugterra: Slug Fu Showdown (2 Parts)"	Logan McPherson, Johnny Darrell, Clint Butler, Daniel DeSerranno	Ken Pontac, Guy Toubes	April 14, 2014	April 19, 2014	TBA
Eli has added some awesome new slugs to his arsenal: the extremely powerful Elemental Slugs. But in order to control them, Junjie tells Eli he must learn Slug Fu, the ancient form of slugslinging that Junjie mastered in the Eastern Caverns. Slug Fu is the art of guiding and controlling a slug in battle, a skill that only the greatest slugslingers can master. But a new villain plans to use the Elementals to reduce all of Slugterra to rubble and it's up to Eli and the Shane Gang to stop him before its too late.

=== Season 5 (2015) ===
No. overall	No. in season	Title	Directed by	Written by	Canada air date	U.S. air date	Prod. code
47	1	"Slugterra: Eastern Caverns Part 1 (The Journey to the Eastern Caverns)"	Daniel DeSerranno	Ken Pontac	October 1, 2015	October 4, 2017 (Netflix)	401
Eli and the Gang find a way to take Junjie back home to the Eastern Caverns and discover trouble waiting for them when they arrive.
48	2	"Slugterra: Eastern Caverns Part 2 (The Great Slug Robbery)"	Ben Anderson	Guy Toubes	October 8, 2015	October 4, 2017 (Netflix)	402
Upon returning to the Outlaws’ jungle camp, the Shane Gang suffer a sneak attack from the Emperor’s Underlord Holt, who steals almost all of their slugs and loads them onto the Dragon Train for transport to the Emperor. With precious few slugs to use as ammo, the Shane Gang must be extra resourceful to get them back.
49	3	"Slugterra: Eastern Caverns Part 3 (The Tournament of the Underlords)"	Richard Johnson	Matt Wayne	October 15, 2015	October 5, 2017 (Netflix)	403
In order to reach the Emperor of the Eastern Caverns, Eli and Junjie pose as Underlords to enter the Tournament of Underlords. But when Holt turns up to expose the Shane Gang, it's up to Pronto to stop him.
50	4	"Slugterra: Eastern Caverns Part 4 (The Emperor)"	Sebastian Brodin	Scott Sonneborn	October 22, 2015	October 5, 2017 (Netflix)	404
In an epic battle, Junjie and Eli confront the Emperor and the Dai-Fu as the fate of the entire Eastern Caverns hangs in the balance!
51	5	"Second Chances"	Daniel DeSerranno	Jonathan Callan	October 29, 2015	October 6, 2017 (Netflix)	405
While Junjie struggles with the knowledge of what he did during his time as the Dark Slinger, the Shane Gang meet a former servant of the Emperor called Underlord Swick (the one who has a habit of calling others "nimrods") who wants to turn over a new leaf. But can the Shane Gang help a bad guy learn to do good? In the end, Swick turns his natural clumsiness to his advantage by returning to the enemy as a spy for the Shane Gang, saying that while he isn't good at being a good guy, he is good at "doing bad badly."
52	6	"Get Pronto!"	Ben Anderson	Kendra Hibbert	November 5, 2015	October 6, 2017 (Netflix)	406
The Shane Gang decides to use Pronto as bait when they arrive at a cavern overrun by thieves. But their plan goes awry when Underlord Holt arrives and commands the thieves to work together to bring him Pronto – dead or alive!
53	7	"Stuff of Legend"	Richard Johnson	Patrick Reiger	November 12, 2015	October 7, 2017 (Netflix)	407
When the Shane Gang travel to the Auroris Mine, they discover a legendary monster carved out of stone attacking the mines—the Pyritor. Trixie studies the legend to help them locate the creature’s home and put a stop to its reign of terror, but first they must confront the true nature of the beast, and its assistant!
54	8	"Eastern Tech"	Richard Johnson	Patrick Reiger	November 19, 2015	October 7, 2017 (Netflix)	408
Determined to up his game against Stone Warriors, Kord visits a famous Eastern Technician for help creating a new blaster upgrade.
55	9	"Slug Day"	Daniel DeSerranno	Adam Beechen	November 25, 2015	October 8, 2017 (Netflix)	409
Thieves steal precious cargo; the gang discover who The Giver really is.
56	10	"The Fall of the Eastern Champion"	Jeremy Brown, Daniel DeSarranno	Scott Sonneborn	February 5, 2016	October 8, 2017 (Netflix)	410
Junjie recounts the ancient history of the Eastern Caverns and his ancestors, and the events that led to his downfall and transformation from the Eastern Champion to the Dark Slinger.
57	11	"The Lady and the Sword"	Ben Anderson	Matt Wayne	January 22, 2016	October 9, 2017 (Netflix)	411
When Pronto accidentally uses the Emperor's sword blaster, he can suddenly do no wrong. Meanwhile, Lady Dai-Fu manipulates Underlord Holt into trapping the Shane Gang with a new superweapon: the Iron Warrior!
58	12	"The Emperor Strikes Back"	Sebastian Brodin	Alexx Van Dyne	January 29, 2016	October 13, 2017 (Netflix)	412
The Emperor sets to work creating Unstoppable Warriors to reclaim the Eastern Caverns. To make things even more difficult, a bounty is placed on Junjie's head, sending the Dai-Fu and hordes of the Emperor's Underlords after the Shane Gang.
59	13	"The Return of the Eastern Champion"	Richard Johnson	Raffaza E	February 26, 2016	October 14, 2017 (Netflix)	413
The gang recruits their friends, and some enemies, to help them take down the Emperor once and for all.

=== Season 6 (2016) ===
No. overall	No. in season	Title	Directed by	Written by	Canada air date	U.S. air date	Prod. code
60	1	"Slugterra: Into the Shadows Part 1 (Back on the Shane Gang)"	Michael Dowding, Andrew Duncan	Jonathan Callan	March 30, 2018	June 25, 2018 (Netflix)	501
The Shane Gang return home to the 99 caverns to find Gateway Cavern overrun with slugs. In their absence, the Shadow Clan have governed by putting the slugs before the people, and the result is chaos! It's up to Eli to restore the balance, but the Shadow Clan aren't as friendly as they once were...and that's saying something. Help comes from an unexpected source-Tad and his slug Pieper, who just arrived from the Surface!
61	2	"Slugterra: Into the Shadows Part 2 (The New Boss)"	Michael Dowding, Andrew Duncan	Sib Ventress	April 6, 2018	July 2, 2018 (Netflix)	502
The Shane Gang take Tad under their wing, training him to blast like a pro with Eli's old blaster and teaching him to live by the slugslinger's code. Tad takes to it like a natural, and as Kord says, it looks like they have another "slugslinging savant from the Surface" on their hands. But their training will be put to the test when Tad accompanies them to a showdown with the Scrap Force...and the Shadow Clan!
62	3	"Slugterra: Into the Shadows Part 3 (Out of the Shadows)"	Michael Dowding, Andrew Duncan	Patrick Reiger	July 13, 2018	July 9, 2018 (Netflix)	503
Tad is still missing after the slug-out with the Shadow Clan, but the Gang have to set off without him when reports start coming in of slugs disappearing all across the 99 caverns. As they pursue the trail of missing slugs, the mystery grows darker when it leads them straight to Dr. Blakk's old stronghold!
63	4	"Slugterra: Into the Shadows Part 4 (Ghouls and Monsters)"	Michael Dowding, Andrew Duncan	Tom Pugsley	August 27, 2018	July 16, 2018 (Netflix)	504
Tad's hypnotic slug Pieper has gone megamorph, his gang of supporters all have Gattler blasters, and not only does he reveal his true identity as Blakk's son but Tad's control over his army of ghouls is stronger than Dr. Blakk's ever was. The Shane Gang are under non-stop ghoul fire as they struggle to put a stop to Tad's plans and end the mass ghouling of slugs once and for all! But then they send Tad to the Deep Caverns and just then after their mission Eli gets a message from his dad that he is 16 years old and the rest of the gang makes a birthday cake for him to cheer him up. But after that, it is seen that Tad is saved by his slug Pieper and prepares to take revenge from Eli. Note: This episode is the series finale, and it ends the series on a cliffhanger.
