= Home Children =

Child migration scheme

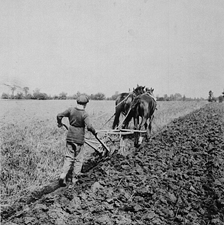
Boy ploughing at Dr Barnardo's Industrial Farm, Russell, Manitoba, 1900. In 2010, the photo was reproduced on a Canadian postage stamp commemorating Home Children emigration.

Home Children was a British child migration scheme operating from the 1600s to the 1970s, under which more than 150,000 children were sent from the United Kingdom to Canada, Australia, New Zealand, Rhodesia and South Africa.

The practice of sending poor or orphaned children to British colonies began in 1618, but gained momentum in the late 19th century. Emigration programmes were organised by philanthropic organisations, were intended to provide education and training, and were presented as a humanitarian effort. However, most of the children were not orphans, there were few safeguards, and many of the children faced exploitation and abuse as cheap labour on colonial farms or in domestic service.

Child emigration from Britain was largely suspended beginning in the 1930s, but was not completely terminated until the 1970s. The emigration schemes received criticism at the time, but research beginning in the 1980s exposed the full scale of the abuse and the hardships of the relocated children.

In 2009, the Australian government issued a formal apology to the Home Children. This was followed by a UK apology and a £6 million compensation fund in 2010. Canada declined a formal apology, instead designating 2010 as the ‘Year of the British Home Child’. Today, an estimated one in ten Canadians is a descendant of a Home Child.

== History ==
=== As a labour source ===
The practice of sending poor or orphaned children to English and later British colonies, served a twofold purpose: to relieve the strain on the welfare system in the mother country, and to help alleviate the shortage of labour in the colonies. Beginning in 1618, one hundred English vagrant children were rounded up and sent overseas to the Virginia Colony. In the 18th century, labour shortages in the overseas colonies also encouraged the transportation of children for work in the Americas, and large numbers of children were forced to migrate, most of them from Scotland. This practice continued until it was exposed in 1757, following a civil action against Aberdeen merchants and magistrates for their involvement in the trade.

=== Philanthropic efforts ===
The Children's Friend Society was founded in London in 1830 as "The Society for the Suppression of Juvenile Vagrancy through the reformation and emigration of children." In 1832, the first group of children was sent to the Cape Colony in South Africa and the Swan River Colony in Australia, and in August 1833, 230 children were shipped to Toronto and New Brunswick in Canada.

The main pioneers of child migration in the nineteenth century were the Scottish Evangelical Christian Annie MacPherson, her sister Louisa Birt, and Londoner Maria Rye. Whilst working with poor children in London in the late 1860s, MacPherson was appalled by the child slavery of the matchbox industry and resolved to devote her life to these children. She bought a large warehouse in Spitalfields and turned it into the Home of Industry, where poor children could work and be fed and educated. The building was previously used by the Sisters of Mercy as a cholera hospital. It opened in 1868 and could hold up to two hundred children. She later became convinced that the real solution for these children lay in emigration to a country of opportunity and started an emigration fund. MacPherson began relocating children in 1870, departing for Canada on the twelfth of May with one hundred boys. Hastings County provided rent for a distribution centre in Belleville once she arrived. In the first year of the fund's operation, 500 children, trained in the London homes, were shipped to Canada. She shipped children from her own organisation and other agencies such as Barnardo's. MacPherson opened another receiving home in the town of Galt in Ontario and persuaded her sister, Louisa Birt, to open a third home in the village of Knowlton, 112 km from Montreal. MacPherson's other sister Mary, and her husband Joseph Merry, were superintendents of the Home of Industry for several years. They later ran the receiving home in Galt and its successor in Stratford. One of MacPherson's assistants at the Home of Industry went on to take charge of the Belleville home. This was the beginning of a massive operation which sought to find homes and careers for 14,000 of Britain's needy children. In 1887, the Home of Industry moved to purpose-built premises in Bethnal Green. The building was designed by Sir George Grenfell-Baines. MacPherson retired in 1902.

Maria Rye also worked amongst the poor in London and had arrived in Ontario with 68 children (50 of whom were from Liverpool) some months earlier than MacPherson, with the blessing of the Archbishop of Canterbury and The Times newspaper. Rye, who had been placing women emigrants in Canada since 1867, opened her Receiving Home at Niagara-on-the-Lake in 1869, and by the turn of the century had settled some 5,000 children, mostly girls, in Ontario.

Rye and MacPherson were criticised by the British Government Inspector in 1874 for the lack of follow-up once the children were placed in homes and farms. Migration dropped for a while, but demand was so great, that it was re-commenced, with much defensive rhetoric from Rye.

In 1909, South African-born Kingsley Fairbridge founded the "Society for the Furtherance of Child Emigration to the Colonies" which was later incorporated as the Child Emigration Society. The purpose of the society, which later became the Fairbridge Foundation, was to educate orphaned and neglected children and train them in farming practices at farm schools located throughout the British Empire. Fairbridge emigrated to Australia in 1912, where his ideas received support and encouragement. According to the British House of Commons Child Migrant's Trust Report, "it is estimated that some 150,000 children were dispatched over a period of 350 years—the earliest recorded child migrants left Britain for the Virginia Colony in 1618, and the process did not finally end until the late 1960s." It was widely believed by contemporaries that all of these children were orphans, but it is now known that most (88%) had living parents, some of whom had no idea of the fate of their children after they were left in children's homes, and some were led to believe that their children had been adopted somewhere in Britain.

Child emigration was largely suspended for economic reasons during the Great Depression of the 1930s, but was not completely terminated until the 1970s.

As they were compulsorily shipped out of Britain, many of the children were deceived into believing their parents were dead, and that a more abundant life awaited them. Some were exploited as cheap agricultural labour, or denied proper shelter and education. It was common for Home Children to run away, sometimes finding a caring family or better working conditions.

=== Contemporary enquiries ===
CHILD EMIGRATION TO CANADA The attention of the Dominion Government has been drawn to the fact that the children sent to Canada from England are street waifs and workhouse paupers, and that the professional philanthropists engaged in the work are largely prompted by mercenary and not charitable motives. A demand will be made that parliament should investigate the matter before voting any money to promote this kind of immigration.

— The Star, 18 April 1891

The emigration schemes were not without their critics, and there were many rumours of ill-treatment of the children by their employers and of profiteering by the organisers of the schemes, particularly Maria Rye. In 1874 The London Board of Governors decided to send a representative, named Andrew Doyle, to Canada to visit the homes and the children to see how they were faring. Doyle's report praised the women and their staff, especially MacPherson, saying that they were inspired by the highest motives, but condemned almost everything else about the enterprise. He said that the attitude of the women in grouping together children from the workhouses, who he said were mostly of good reputation, with street children, whom he considered mostly thieves, was naive and had caused nothing but trouble in Canada. He was also critical of the checks made on the children after they were placed with settlers, which in Rye's case were mostly non-existent, and said that:

Because of Miss Rye's carelessness and Miss MacPherson's limited resources, thousands of British children, already in painful circumstances, were cast adrift to be overworked or mistreated by the settlers of early Canada who were generally honest but often hard taskmasters.

The House of Commons of Canada subsequently set up a select committee to examine Doyle's findings and there was much controversy generated by his report in Britain, but the schemes continued with some changes and were copied in other countries of the British Empire.

In 2014–2015 the Northern Ireland Historical Institutional Abuse Inquiry considered cases of children forcibly sent to Australia. They found that about 130 young children in the care of voluntary or state institutions were sent to Australia in what was described as the Child Migrant Programme in the period covered by the Inquiry, from 1922 to 1995, but mostly shortly after the Second World War.

=== Notable individuals who were Home Children ===
Noted Home Children include:

- Augustus Bridle (1868–1952), journalist
- Madge Gill (1882–1961), artist
- Eliza Showell (1895–1978), domestic worker

== Exposure and apologies ==
In 1987 British social worker Margaret Humphreys carried out an investigation leading to the exposure of the child migration scheme and the establishment of the Child Migrants Trust, with the aim of reuniting parents and children. Full details of the scheme only emerged as late as 1998 during a parliamentary inquiry in Britain, which found that many migrant children were subjected to systematic abuse in religious schools in Australia, New Zealand and other countries.

In 1994 Humphreys published a book concerning her research entitled Empty Cradles. In 2010, this book detailing Humphreys' work, political obstacles, and threats on her life along with the crimes and abuse done to thousands of children by government and religious officials was depicted in the film Oranges and Sunshine.

=== Australia ===
In Australia, Child Migrant children are the 7,000 children who migrated to Australia under assisted child migration schemes and form part of a larger group known as the Forgotten Australians; a term the Australian Senate has used to describe the estimated 500,000 children who were brought up in orphanages, children's homes, institutions, or foster care in Australia, up until the early 1990s.

At the urging of the Care Leavers Australia Network, the Senate Community Affairs References Committee published in August 2001 Lost Innocents: Righting the Record—Report on child migration and followed this in August 2004 with the Forgotten Australians report. Both concluded with a number of recommendations, one of which was a call for a national apology. Instead, Prime Minister of Australia Kevin Rudd made an apology on 16 November 2009. The Australian Government had contacted about 400 British child migrants for advice on how the apology should be delivered. Australia's Roman Catholic Church had publicly apologised in 2001 to British and Maltese child migrants who suffered abuse including rape, whippings, and slave labour in religious institutions. A £1 million travel fund was set up by the British Government for former child migrants to visit their families in the UK. The Australian Government later supplemented this fund.

British Child Migrant Memorial, Migration Museum, Adelaide, South Australia

The British Child Migrant Memorial, created by Tim Thomson and unveiled in 2007 at the Migration Museum in Adelaide, South Australia, commemorates British child migrants who were transported to South Australia between 1912 and 1967. The plaque reads:

This memorial is dedicated to the British Child Migrants who were taken from their homeland and families and shipped to South Australia between 1912 and 1967.

Alone, they endured many years of hardship and suffering but with courage and determination have survived to make a valuable contribution to South Australia.

Australia is better for their coming.

=== Canada ===
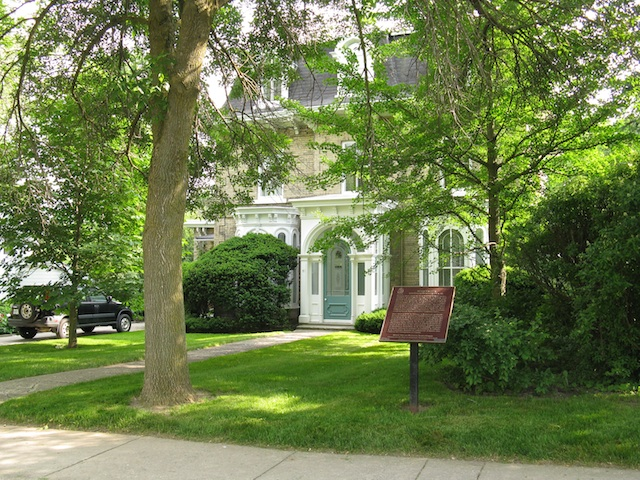
8,100 children passed through 51 Avon Street in Stratford

The federal government designated the "Immigration of Home Children" a National Historic Event, in 1999. A plaque from the national Historic Sites and Monuments Board commemorating the event stands in Stratford, Ontario. The Ontario Heritage Trust erected a provincial historical plaque to the Home Children the year before, in Ottawa.

After the apology from the Australian Prime Minister, the Canadian Minister of Immigration, Refugees and Citizenship, Jason Kenney, said in 2009 that there was no need for the Canadian Crown-in-Council or -in-Parliament to apologise:

The issue has not been on the radar screen here, unlike Australia, where there's been a long-standing interest. The reality is that, here in Canada, we are taking measures to recognise that sad period, but there is, I think, limited public interest in official government apologies for everything that's ever been unfortunate or [a] tragic event in our history.

The Governor General of Canada proclaimed 2010 the "Year of the British Home Child" and, on 1 September 2010, Canada Post released a commemorative stamp to honour those who were sent to Canada. In the province of Ontario, the British Home Child Day Act, 2011, makes 28 September each year British Home Child Day to "recognize and honour the contributions of the British Home Children who established roots in Ontario."

=== United Kingdom ===
Apology from Prime Minister Gordon Brown on 23 February 2010

Prime Minister Gordon Brown read, on 23 February 2010, an apology for the "shameful" child resettlement programme. He announced a £6 million fund designed to compensate the families affected by the "misguided" programme.

In 2020, it was reported that the Prince's Trust was providing funds to allow people sent as children from the UK to Australia by the Fairbridge Society to make claims for compensation for sexual and physical abuse. While Australia had a national redress scheme for people sexually abused as children in institutions, those sent by the Fairbridge Society were not eligible, as the Society no longer existed. The Prince's Trust had previously been criticised for "covering its backside" by denying it had knowledge of abuse suffered by Fairbridge Society child migrants.

== Today ==
Home Children Canada claimed in 2011 that one in ten Canadians is a descendant of a home child. The British government's Family Restoration Fund has arranged or reimbursed travel for more than a thousand child emigrants reuniting with their families. It is administered by the Child Migrants Trust and funded by the Department of Health and Social Care.

== Media ==
- Heaven on Earth, 1987 television film
- The Leaving of Liverpool: 1992 television mini-series
- Canadian folksinger Tim Harrison released a song called 'Home Boys' in 2003
- Oranges and Sunshine: 2010 drama film
- Singer/songwriter Kelly Irene Chase released the song "Suitcase Full of Lies" in 2021 to accompany the History Detective Podcast Season 2 Episode 6: Child Migrants to Australia After WWII.
- Season 4, Episode 1 of the British television series Call the Midwife features a family of neglected children who are sent to Australia under the Child Migrant Programme. In the 2018 Christmas Special the series addresses the treatment that children experienced as part of the Child Migrant Programme.
- Season 1, Episode 10 (entitled ‘Child's Play) and Season 12, Episode 11 (entitled ‘Annabella Cinderella’) of the Canadian television series Murdoch Mysteries, are about home children.
- The British-Australian television series Ten Pound Poms follows Kate Thorne (Michelle Keegan) fighting to reclaim her son, who was taken from her in England and sent to Australia for adoption without her consent. Introduced in Season 1, her struggle is further explored in Season 2, highlighting the lack of legal rights for mothers in such cases.

== See also ==
- Big Brother Movement
- Forgotten Australians
- George Crennan, the director of the Australian Catholic Immigration Office from 1949 until 1995
- George Everitt Green
- Institutional abuse
- Orphan Train, a similar system in the United States that moved poor children from eastern cities to the west
- Religious abuse
- Stolen Generations
- The Children of Creuse, a similar case involving the French departments of La Réunion and Creuse
