= List of Sahaya episodes =

2019 Philippine television drama fantasy series

Sahaya is a 2019 Philippine television drama fantasy series broadcast by GMA Network. It premiered on the network's Telebabad line up and worldwide on GMA Pinoy TV on March 18, 2019 to September 6, 2019 replacing Onanay.

NUTAM (Nationwide Urban Television Audience Measurement) People in Television Homes ratings are provided by AGB Nielsen Philippines. The series ended, but its the 25th-week run, and with a total of 122 episodes. It was replaced by Beautiful Justice.

== Series overview ==
Month	Episodes	Monthly averages
Month	Episodes	NUTAM
March 2019	10	10.6%
April 2019	20	10.7%
May 2019	23	11.6%
June 2019	20	11.4%
July 2019	23	10.9%
August 2019	22	10.7%
September 2019	5	11.9%
Total	122	11.1%

== Episodes ==
=== March 2019 ===
Episode		Original air date	Social media hashtag	Word of the day (Sinama)	AGB Nielsen NUTAM People in Television Homes		Ref.
Episode		Original air date	Social media hashtag	Word of the day (Sinama)	Rating	Timeslot rank	Ref.
1	"Pilot"	March 18, 2019	#Sahaya	—N/a	10.2%	#2	
2	"Pinagpala" transl. (Blessed)	March 19, 2019	#SahayaPinagpala	Panglima – Lider, pinuno	10.0%	#2	
3	"Kaligtasan" transl. (Safety)	March 20, 2019	#SahayaKaligtasan	Tuhan – Diyos	10.8%	#2	
4	"Kapalit ng Buhay" transl. (Exchange of Life)	March 21, 2019	#SahayaKapalitNgBuhay	Mma' – Tatay	11.3%	#2	
5	"Pagbawi" transl. (Recovery)	March 22, 2019	#SahayaPagbawi	Manisan – Maganda	11.7%	#2	
6	"Kaibigan" (Friend)	March 25, 2019	#SahayaKaibigan	Magsukul – Salamat	11.2%	#2	
7	"Ang Pagdadalaga ni Sahaya" (Sahaya's Adolescence)	March 26, 2019	#AngPagdadalagaNiSahaya	Sahaya – Liwanag	11.0%	#2	
8	"Banta" (Threat)	March 27, 2019	#SahayaBanta	Omboh – Ninuno	10.3%	#2	
9	"Para sa Anak" (For the Child)	March 28, 2019	#SahayaParaSaAnak	'Nggo – Nanay, Ina	10.1%	#2	
10	"Pangako" (Promise)	March 29, 2019	#SahayaPangako	Busong – Karma	9.8%	#2	

=== April 2019 ===
Episode		Original air date	Social media hashtag	Word of the day (Sinama)	AGB Nielsen NUTAM People in Television Homes		Ref.
Episode		Original air date	Social media hashtag	Word of the day (Sinama)	Rating	Timeslot rank	Ref.
11	"Ang Laban ni Sahaya" (Sahaya's Fight)	April 1, 2019	#AngLabanNiSahaya	Sukna – Sumpa	10.3%	#2	
12	"Regalo ni Ahmad kay Sahaya" (Ahmad's Gift for Sahaya)	April 2, 2019	#RegaloNiAhmadKaySahaya	—N/a	12.0%	#2	
13	"Mother's Sacrifice"	April 3, 2019	#SahayaMothersSacrifice	Kaka – Ate / Kuya	10.2%	#2	
14	"Speech"	April 4, 2019	#SahayaSpeech	Sama Dilaut – Badjaw	10.9%	#2	
15	"Harana Para Kay Sahaya" (Serenade for Sahaya)	April 5, 2019	#HaranaParaKaySahaya	Omboh Dilaut – Diyos ng Dagat	11.1%	#2	
16	"Paghahanap kay Sahaya" (Finding Sahaya)	April 8, 2019	#PaghahanapKaySahaya	Mbo' – Lolo	11.0%	#2	
17	"Sahaya Meets Jordan"	April 9, 2019	#SahayaMeetsJordan	Kampong – Tribute / Komunidad	11.5%	#2	
18	"Ligtas" (Safe)	April 10, 2019	#SahayaLigtas	Wali Jinn – Nagsasagawa ng Ritwal	11.2%	#2	
19	"Pamilya ni Sahaya" (Sahaya's Family)	April 11, 2019	#PamilyaNiSahaya	Onde – Bata	12.1%	#2	
20	"Nakatadhana kay Sahaya" (Destined for Sahaya)	April 12, 2019	#NakatadhanaKaySahaya	Omalagad – Kaluluwang Ligaw	11.9%	#2	
21	"Tadhana ni Sahaya" (Sahaya's Destiny)	April 15, 2019	#TadhanaNiSahaya	Panday – Manggagamot na Badjaw	10.4%	#2	
22	"Dasal ni Sahaya" (Sahaya's Prayer)	April 16, 2019	#DasalNiSahaya	Saitan – Demonyo / Masamang Espiritu	10.5%	#2	
23	"Journey Home"	April 17, 2019	#SahayaJourneyHome	Palaw – Bangka	11.1%	#2	
24	"Pag-uwi ni Sahaya" (Sahaya's Homecoming)	April 22, 2019	#PagUwiNiSahaya	Opo-onan – Mula sa Ninuno	11.6%	#2	
25	"Help"	April 23, 2019	#SahayaHelp	Bantut – Bakla / Gay	9.5%	#2	
26	"Muling Pagkikita" (Meeting Again)	April 24, 2019	#SahayaMulingPagkikita	—N/a	9.9%	#2	
27	"Bagong Buhay" (New Life)	April 25, 2019	#SahayaBagongBuhay	Luma – Bahay	9.2%	#2	
28	"Secrets"	April 26, 2019	#SahayaSecrets	Ampun – Paumanhin	8.9%	#2	
29	"Kapalaran" (Fate)	April 29, 2019	#SahayaKapalaran	Magay magay naka? – Kumusta Ka?	10.2%	#2	
30	"Loved"	April 30, 2019	#SahayaLoved	Bapa – Uncle	11.3%	#2	

=== May 2019 ===
Episode		Original air date	Social media hashtag	Word of the day (Sinama)	AGB Nielsen NUTAM People in Television Homes		Ref.
Episode		Original air date	Social media hashtag	Word of the day (Sinama)	Rating	Timeslot rank	Ref.
31	"Panawagan ni Sahaya" (Sahaya's Call)	May 1, 2019	#PanawaganNiSahaya	—N/a	11.0%	#1	
32	"Ang Pag-asa" (The Hope)	May 2, 2019	#SahayaAngPagAsa	Pag-jinn – Ritual	11.9%	#2	
33	"Back to School si Sahaya" (Sahaya goes Back to School)	May 3, 2019	#BackToSchoolSiSahaya	Imam/Dukun – Spiritual Leader	12.1%	#1	
34	"Pagmamalasakit" (Concern)	May 6, 2019	#SahayaPagmamalasakit	—N/a	13.5%	#1	
35	"Panalangin" (Faith)	May 7, 2019	#SahayaPanalangin	—N/a	12.0%	#2	
36	"Paghaharap" (Confrontation)	May 8, 2019	#SahayaPaghaharap	—N/a	12.0%	#2	
37	"Sahaya, Ahmad at Jordan" (Sahaya, Ahmad and Jordan)	May 9, 2019	#SahayaAhmadAtJordan	—N/a	12.2%	#2	
38	"Desisyon" (Decision)	May 10, 2019	#SahayaDesisyon	—N/a	11.2%	#1	
39	"Pagsulong" (Advancement)	May 14, 2019 (Note: Episode 39 did not air on May 13 during the 2019 Philippine general election news coverage.)	#SahayaPagsulong	—N/a	12.2%	#2	
40	"Kasunduan" (Agreement)	May 15, 2019	#SahayaKasunduan	—N/a	10.0%	#2	
41	"Sahaya, Manisan and Irene"	May 16, 2019	#SahayaManisanIrene	—N/a	11.9%	#2	
42	"Palaban" (Gladiatorial)	May 17, 2019	#SahayaPalaban	—N/a	10.9%	#2	
43	"Pakikipagkita" (Meeting)	May 20, 2019	#SahayaPakikipagkita	—N/a	9.9%	#2	
44	"Kutob" (Doubt)	May 21, 2019	#SahayaKutob	—N/a	11.7%	#2	
45	"Pagpili" (Decision)	May 22, 2019	#SahayaPagpili	—N/a	12.6%	#2	
46	"Surprise, Sahaya"	May 23, 2019	#SurpriseSahaya	—N/a	10.9%	#2	
47	"Pagkalinga" (Caring)	May 24, 2019	#SahayaPagkalinga	—N/a	11.2%	#2	
48	"Simula ng Pag-asa" (Start of Hope)	May 27, 2019	#SahayaSimulaNgPagAsa	—N/a	10.6%	#2	
49	"Pagtulong" (Help)	May 28, 2019	#SahayaPagtulong	—N/a	11.6%	#2	
50	"Pagsugod" (Dashing)	May 29, 2019	#SahayaPagsugod	—N/a	12.3%	#2	
51	"Kasagutan" (Answer)	May 30, 2019	#SahayaKasagutan	—N/a	10.6%	#2	
52	"Para sa Pamilya" (For the Family)	May 31, 2019	#SahayaParaSaPamilya	—N/a	12.4%	#2	

=== June 2019 ===
Episode		Original air date	Social media hashtag	AGB Nielsen NUTAM People in Television Homes		Ref.
Episode		Original air date	Social media hashtag	Rating	Timeslot rank	Ref.
53	"Pagsubok" (Trial)	June 3, 2019	#SahayaPagsubok	11.8%	#2	
54	"Pagkikitang Muli" (Meeting Once Again)	June 4, 2019	#SahayaPagkikitangMuli	12.9%	#2	
55	"Paghahanap" (Searching)	June 5, 2019	#SahayaPaghahanap	13.0%	#2	
56	"Pagtuklas ng Katotohanan" (Discovery of Truth)	June 6, 2019	#SahayaPagkuklasNgKatotohanan	11.8%	#2	
57	"Sahaya, Jordan & Ahmad"	June 7, 2019	#SahayaJordanAhmad	11.5%	#2	
58	"Tibok ng Puso" (Heartbeat)	June 10, 2019	#SahayaTibokNgPuso	10.7%	#2	
59	"Buong Pamilya" (Entire Family)	June 11, 2019	#SahayaBuongPamilya	11.5%	#2	
60	"Truth"	June 12, 2019	#SahayaTruth	11.7%	#2	
61	"Blackmail"	June 13, 2019	#SahayaBlackmail	11.5%	#1	
62	"Pagpili" (Choose)	June 14, 2019	#SahayaPagpili	10.9%	#2	
63	"Kasinungalingan" (Lie)	June 17, 2019	#SahayaKasinungalingan	11.2%	#2	
64	"Sahaya & Ahmad"	June 18, 2019	#SahayaAhmad	11.1%	#2	
65	"Sahaya & Jordan"	June 19, 2019	#SahayaJordan	11.0%	#2	
66	"Selos" (Jealous)	June 20, 2019	#SahayaSelos	10.7%	#2	
67	"Pag-unawa" (Understanding)	June 21, 2019	#SahayaPagUnawa	11.4%	#2	
68	"Plano ni Ahmad" (Ahmad's Plan)	June 24, 2019	#SahayaPlanoNiAhamd	11.2%	#2	
69	"Kapit Lang" (Just Hold On)	June 25, 2019	#SahayaKapitLang	11.4%	#2	
70	"Paghahanap" (Searching)	June 26, 2019	#SahayaPaghahanap	11.5%	#2	
71	"Pagbawi" (Redemption)	June 27, 2019	#SahayaPagbawi	10.9%	#2	
72	"Paghabol" (Chasing)	June 28, 2019	#SahayaPaghabol	11.0%	#1	

=== July 2019 ===
Episode		Original air date	Social media hashtag	AGB Nielsen NUTAM People in Television Homes		Ref.
Episode		Original air date	Social media hashtag	Rating	Timeslot rank	Ref.
73	"Paglaban" (Fight)	July 1, 2019	#SahayaPaglaban	11.7%	#2	
74	"Pag-uusig" (Investigation)	July 2, 2019	#SahayaPagUusig	12.0%	#2	
75	"Tuloy ang Laban" (The Battle Continues)	July 3, 2019	#SahayaTuloyAngLaban	11.7%	#2	
76	"Pagbabanta" (Threatening)	July 4, 2019	#SahayaPagbabanta	10.5%	#2	
77	"Pagtuklas" (Discovery)	July 5, 2019	#SahayaPagtuklas	10.9%	#2	
78	"Pangitain" (Premonition)	July 8, 2019	#SahayaPangitain	11.0%	#2	
79	"Emosyon" (Emotion)	July 9, 2019	#SahayaEmosyon	11.2%	#2	
80	"Paglayo" (Letting Go)	July 10, 2019	#SahayaPaglayo	11.0%	#2	
81	"Tapatan" (Confrontation)	July 11, 2019	#SahayaTapatan	11.5%	#2	
82	"Lihim" (Secret)	July 12, 2019	#SahayaLihim	10.7%	#2	
83	"Pangamba" (Fear)	July 15, 2019	#SahayaPangamba	10.9%	#2	
84	"Muling Pagkikita" (Meeting Once Again)	July 16, 2019	#SahayaMulingPagkikita	11.0%	#2	
85	"Desisyon" (Decision)	July 17, 2019	#SahayaDesisyon	10.1%	#2	
86	"Komplikasyon" (Complication)	July 18, 2019	#SahayaKomplikasyon	11.0%	#2	
87	"Pagsubok" (Trial)	July 19, 2019	#SahayaPagsubok	11.2%	#2	
88	"Reward"	July 22, 2019	#SahayaReward	10.1%	#2	
89	"Proteksyon" (Protection)	July 23, 2019	#SahayaProteksyon	10.4%	#2	
90	"Sahaya Fights Back"	July 24, 2019	#SahayaFightsBack	10.4%	#2	
91	"Equality"	July 25, 2019	#SahayaEquality	11.3%	#2	
92	"Kapalit" (Replacement)	July 26, 2019	#SahayaKapalit	11.4%	#2	
93	"Rebelasyon" (Revelation)	July 29, 2019	#SahayaRebelasyon	10.7%	#2	
94	"Tanong" (Ask)	July 30, 2019	#SahayaTanong	10.4%	#2	
95	"Mma"	July 31, 2019	#SahayaMma	9.3%	#2	

=== August 2019 ===
Episode		Original air date	Social media hashtag	AGB Nielsen NUTAM People in Television Homes		Ref.
Episode		Original air date	Social media hashtag	Rating	Timeslot rank	Ref.
96	"Katotohanan" (Truth)	August 1, 2019	#SahayaKatotohanan	10.7%	#2	
97	"Pagbabanta" (Threatening)	August 2, 2019	#SahayaPagbabanta	10.0%	#2	
98	"Plano" (Plan)	August 5, 2019	#SahayaPlano	10.2%	#2	
99	"Pagtakas" (Escaping)	August 6, 2019	#SahayaPagtakas	9.4%	#2	
100	"Buong Pamilya" (Entire Family)	August 7, 2019	#SahayaBuongPamilya	10.4%	#2	
101	"Pabuya" (Reward)	August 8, 2019	#SahayaPabuya	10.4%	#2	
102	"Kampihan" (Alliance)	August 9, 2019	#SahayaKampihan	11.8%	#2	
103	"Dasal" (Prayer)	August 12, 2019	#SahayaDasal	11.9%	#2	
104	"Hadlang" (Barrier)	August 13, 2019	#SahayaHadlang	10.0%	#2	
105	"Kutob" (Doubt)	August 14, 2019	#SahayaKutob	10.2%	#2	
106	"Pagluluksa" (Mourning)	August 15, 2019	#SahayaPagluluksa	10.5%	#2	
107	"Kasinungalingan" (Lie)	August 16, 2019	#SahayaKasinungalingan	10.0%	#2	
108	"Poot" (Wrath)	August 19, 2019	#SahayaPoot	10.8%	#2	
109	"Busong" (Karma)	August 20, 2019	#SahayaBusong	11.0%	#2	
110	"Sahaya, Laban!" (Sahaya, Fight!)	August 21, 2019	#SahayaLaban	10.9%	#2	
111	"Paghaharap" (Confrontation)	August 22, 2019	#SahayaPaghaharap	10.7%	#2	
112	"Sabwatan" (Conspiracy)	August 23, 2019	#SahayaSabwatan	10.9%	#2	
113	"Integridad" (Integrity)	August 26, 2019	#SahayaIntegridad	11.1%	#2	
114	"Tapang" (Strength)	August 27, 2019	#SahayaTapang	10.1%	#2	
115	"Konsensya" (Conscience)	August 28, 2019	#SahayaKonsensya	11.0%	#2	
116	"Paghilom" (Healing)	August 29, 2019	#SahayaPaghilom	11.2%	#2	
117	"Nasaan si Sahaya?" (Where is Sahaya?)	August 30, 2019	#NasaanSiSahaya	11.5%	#2	

=== September 2019 ===
Episode		Original air date	Social media hashtag	AGB Nielsen NUTAM People in Television Homes		Ref.
Episode		Original air date	Social media hashtag	Rating	Timeslot rank	Ref.
118	"Huling Lunes" (transl. Final Monday)	September 2, 2019	#SahayaHulingLunes	11.6%	#2	
119	"Huling Martes" (transl. Final Tuesday)	September 3, 2019	#SahayaHulingMartes	11.9%	#2	
120	"Huling Miyerkules" (transl. Final Wednesday)	September 4, 2019	#SahayaHulingMiyerkules	12.1%	#2	
121	"Huling Huwebes" (transl. Final Thursday)	September 5, 2019	#SahayaHulingHuwebes	11.4%	#2	
122	"Ang Pagtatapos" (transl. The Ending)	September 6, 2019	#SahayaAngPagtatapos	12.5%	#2	

Episodes notes
