= Eliza Showell =

English-born child migrant (1895–1978)

- Showell as a young woman in Cape Breton
- Born: 1895; Black Country, West Midlands, England
- Died: 1978 (aged 82–83); Inverness, Nova Scotia, Canada
- Occupation: Domestic servant
- Known for: Home Child migrant
- Notable work: Inspiration for The Home Child
- Relatives: Liz Berry (great-niece)

Eliza Showell (1895–1978) was an English-born child migrant sent to Canada in 1908 as part of the British Home Children programme. In Canada, she was placed in indentured service. Her story inspired The Home Child, a poetry collection by Liz Berry, Showell's great-niece.

== Life ==
Eliza Showell was born in 1895 in England, in the Black Country area of the West Midlands. She was orphaned by the age of 12, and became resident at the Middlemore Children's Emigration Home in Birmingham. She became separated from her brothers, who had to sign her admission papers to the home, founded by John Middlemore, a local philanthropist. The home arranged the emigration of poor children to Canada from the United Kingdom, where they were placed in work until reaching adulthood. The Middlemore Home was one of many organisations involved in a broader child migration movement known as the Home Children. About 100,000 children are estimated to have come to Canada this way between 1869 and 1948.

In May 1908 Showell was sent to Canada, crossing the Atlantic from Liverpool aboard the ship Carthaginian, arriving in Halifax, Nova Scotia. She never returned to Britain or saw her brothers again. On arrival, Showell was placed in indentured domestic service, including on a Cape Breton farm. She spent her entire working life in domestic service roles. Showell's first name changed to Liza at some point, after which records became scarcer. After World War I, one of Showell's brothers wrote to Middlemore trying to track her down. He wrote "I have lost all trace of her".

Showell never married, and spent the final years of her life in an Inverness nursing home, Inverary Manor. A member of staff who worked at the home from 1974 recalled that Showell was non-verbal, except for the single word "candy" to ask for a sweet.

Showell died in Inverness in 1978. She was buried in Malagawatch Cemetery by Bras d'Or Lake. The burial was paid for by her employers.

Showell's story was the inspiration for a poetry collection by Liz Berry, her great-niece. The Home Child (Chatto & Windus, 2023) imagines Showell's journey by extrapolating beyond the few facts that are known about her life. It won The Writers' Prize in 2024.
