= Baleleng =

Filipino/Spanish folk song

"Baleleng" is a Filipino traditional song of Sama Dilaut and/or Tausug origin. The composer of the song is not credited and unknown. The tune was passed by mouth from province to province, with the original lyrics of the song having since been altered. Versions of Filipino artists have made the song popular in both the Visayan and Tagalog languages.

"Leleng" or "Ling Ling" was the original title of the song which means "darling", "sweetheart", "my lady" or "my dear" in the Sama Dilaut language. In Philippine languages such as Visayan and Tagalog, the enclitic "ba" is used as a question marker. Example: "Aalis ka na ba?" (Tagalog); "Are you leaving now?" (English). Since the song was passed from generation to generation, the lyrics were wrongly interpreted as "Baleleng".

The song is about a man bidding goodbye to a lady called Leleng as he is going to war. Like other Sama Dilaut songs, it is sung with the accompaniment of a string instrument like the gitgit and biula, or the gabbang and the kulintangan.

== In popular culture ==
The folk song was used as an ending theme in the Philippine television drama Sahaya broadcast by GMA Network starring Bianca Umali in the title role, a Badjao from Zamboanga who despite her struggles in life stay true to her identity.
