= Strange Planet =

1999 film

- Cover of UK DVD.
- Directed by: Emma-Kate Croghan
- Written by: Emma-Kate Croghan; Stavros Kazantzidis
- Produced by: Stavros Kazantzidis; Bruno Charlesworth
- Starring: Claudia Karvan; Naomi Watts; Tom Long; Felix Williamson; Hugo Weaving; Alice Garner; Aaron Jeffery
- Cinematography: Justin Brinkle
- Production companies: Premium Movie Partnership; Showtime Australia; Strange Planet; NSW Film and Television Office; Australian Film Finance Corporation
- Distributed by: New Vision Films
- Release date: 7 October 1999
- Running time: 92 minutes
- Country: Australia
- Language: English
- Box office: A$377,615

Strange Planet is a 1999 Australian dramedy film directed by Emma-Kate Croghan and starring Claudia Karvan, Naomi Watts, Alice Garner and Hugo Weaving. The film takes place in Sydney between New Year's Eve 1998 and January 2000. It was Croghan's follow up to Love and Other Catastrophes and used many of the same cast and crew.

== Plot ==
The film explores the lives of three male friends and three female friends over the course of one year. Judy has an affair with her married boss. Sally is a party girl open to all experiences. Alice is morally strict but feels stuck.

Ewan is a lawyer who hates the law. Joel is left by his wife. Neil is desperate for love.

== Cast ==
- Claudia Karvan as Judy
- Naomi Watts as Alice
- Alice Garner as Sally
- Tom Long as Ewan
- Aaron Jeffery as Joel
- Gennie Nevinson as Therapist
- Felix Williamson as Neil
- Hugo Weaving as Steven
- Rebecca Frith as Amanda
- Ling-Hsueh Tang as Verna
- Helen Thomson as Lulu
- Marshall Napier as Robert
- Kate Beahan as Poppy
- Reg Mombassa as Judy's father (cameo)

== Production ==
At one stage it was planned that the film would be shot at the same time as another movie, Revolver which would be directed by Emma Kate Croghan while Stavros Kazantzidis would make Strange Planet. However, in the end Croghan directed Planet and Revolver was never made.

The time lapse footage of the Sydney Harbour Bridge was shot by a cameraman who was permitted to climb the bridge without a harness and spend 12 hours there overnight.

Dusty Springfield personally cleared the film's usage of her recording of "The Look of Love" only days before her death in March 1999.

== Reception ==
The film was well-received critically but a disappointment commercially that received little marketing attention. In 2005, Croghan told The Age:

With Love and Other Catastrophes there was so much interest about the way the film had been made, and the fact that a very young woman (of 23) had directed the film seemed amazing to people... There was a lot of interest in the process and it got a lot of press coverage. Strange Planet didn't. There wasn't a story around it for people and the press to hook into.

Croghan is yet to direct another feature film.
