= Ice and Fire =

Ice and Fire may refer to:

== Literature ==
- Ice and Fire, a 1986 novel by Andrea Dworkin
- Ice and Fire, a 1988 novel in the Deathlands series by Laurence James
- A Song of Ice and Fire, a series of fantasy novels by George R. R. Martin

== Other uses ==
- Ice and Fire (charity), a London-based charity exploring human rights through performance
- Ice & Fire, a 1995 video game

== See also ==
- Fire and Ice (disambiguation)
