= True Love and Chaos =

- Directed by: Stavros Kazantzidis
- Written by: Stavros Kazantzidis
- Produced by: Ann Darrouzet
- Starring: Naveen Andrews; Miranda Otto; Noah Taylor; Hugo Weaving; Ben Mendelsohn; Kimberley Davies
- Cinematography: Laszlo Baranyi
- Edited by: Ken Sallows
- Music by: Martin Lubran, David Bowers
- Distributed by: NewVision (Australia); Beyond (international)
- Release date: 1997
- Running time: 94 minutes
- Country: Australia
- Language: English
- Budget: A$2.4 million
- Box office: A$519,573 (Australia)(Australia)

True Love and Chaos is a 1997 Australian film directed by Stavros Efthymiou. It is a road movie.

Efthymiou managed to get the film funded on the basis of the success of Love and Other Catastrophes.

True Love and Chaos is a warm and humorous story of human fallibilities, a young woman's rite of passage, familial ties, and the on-going search for simple and pure relationships.

== Plot ==
Mimi (Miranda Otto), a twenty-something backing singer with a country band and waitress, is returning home to make peace with her mother who lives in Perth, and hopefully get her to tell her the name of her father. Mimi wants her boyfriend Hanif (Naveen Andrews), to accompany her, but he procrastinates. Though he clearly cares for her, he also fears commitment.

Hanif becomes involved in a drug theft masterminded by his lovesick junkie friend, Dean (Noah Taylor), who has been attracted to his violent brother’s girlfriend, Ariel (Kimberley Davies). Together Hanif and Dean steal a cache of drugs from Dean’s brother, Jerry (Ben Mendelsohn). Hanif and Dean escape Melbourne by joining Mimi on her journey westwards. Hanif concocts half-truths and keeps Mimi oblivious to the stolen drugs. Mimi shows obvious signs of being pregnant, but Hanif is slow to understand. Jerry learns Hanif and Dean's destination and sets out in hot pursuit, with hatred in his heart and a gun in his pocket, purchased from a marina security guard, Crazy Craig (Hung Le).

On the road Mimi meets Morris (Hugo Weaving), a charming cynic and alcoholic bearded singer in the Leonard Cohen/Nick Cave style who has ended up in a cover band. Morris joins them, despite Hanif's resentments. Mimi tells Morris that she has never known her father and had left home because her mother refused to disclose anything about him. Mimi also tells Morris that she believes, "If you're good, good things will happen to you." Morris encourages Mimi to take her singing seriously. Hanif becomes jealous of their growing friendship. Hanif is also disturbed to discover that Dean has been unable to shake his drug habit.

In a small town Mimi wins a karaoke singing competition. Morris makes a pass at Mimi. This upsets and confuses her. As the foursome drive towards Perth, Jerry suddenly appears and attempts to run them off the road. Mimi is furious and demands to know the truth. Dean confesses to stealing Jerry's drugs. Mimi has had it with Hanif. She tells him that it's over between them. Hanif finally realises that Mimi is pregnant.

One they reach Perth, Mimi tells her mother, Hannah (Geneviève Picot), that she no longer cares about knowing her father's identity and that she plans to keep her child. Morris unexpectedly arrives at Hannah's house. Mimi learns that Morris is her father. Upset, Mimi runs off. Meanwhile, to Jerry’s considerable irritation, he has discovered Ariel has flown across country to see him.

Hanif and Dean find Mimi outside their hotel. Hanif says he loves her. Mimi tells him that Morris is her father. Jerry appears and traps the threesome in a park. Blood is spilt in the ensuing chaos, and those remaining must learn to live with the consequences of their actions.

== Cast ==
- Miranda Otto as Mimi
- Naveen Andrews as Hanif
- Noah Taylor as Dean
- Ben Mendelsohn as Jerry
- Hugo Weaving as Morris
- Kimberley Davies as Ariel
- Geneviève Picot as Hannah
- Saskia Post as Sam
- Hung Le as Crazy Craig
- Marieke Hardy as Out of it Woman
- Des Mullan as Country & Western Lead Singer
- Antoinette Halloran as Country & Western Lead Singer
- Pia Manning as Country & Western Backing Singer
- Matthew Dyktynski as Rusty
- David Bowers as Neil
- Stefan Berg as Morris' band member
- Martin Lubran as Morris' band member
- Peta Doodson as Bartender
- Constance Lansberg as Female Soap Star
- Lois Collinder as Karaoke Compere
- Libby Stone as Karaoke Singer
- Vivienne Benton as Karaoke Singer
- Penny Schlam as Truckstop Proprietor
- Stavros Kazantzidis as Harry
- Nina Landis as Affirmation Voice

== Production ==
A Westside Films production. Development, production and marketing assistance by Film Victoria. Script developed with the assistance of the Australian Film Commission. Financed by the Australian Film Finance Corporation Limited. Produced with the assistance of Mushroom Music & Mushroom Records. Australian distributor was NewVision; Beyond was the international sales agent.

Production is listed as being from 15 April 1996 to 15 May 1996 in the Cinema Papers' August 1996 production survey. The press kit lists a seven week shoot; the limited budget only allowed for two weeks location shooting.

== Soundtrack ==
Original music composed by Martin Lubran and David Bowers.

Includes songs by Tom Jones (singer), Blondie (band), Leonard Cohen, Moloko, Yothu Yindi, Powderfinger, Nick Cave and the Bad Seeds, Ash (band), Beasts of Bourbon, Pollyanna (band), Dead Star, The Stone Cold Boners, Hugo Weaving, Matthew Dyktynski, Miranda Otto, No Fixed Address, Banana Oil, Headless Chickens, Catherine Wearne and Andrew Travis, Chris Wilson, Shocking Blue and Heather Nova.

== Box office ==
The film was given limited theatrical release in Melbourne and Sydney on 22 May 1997, with the gala premiere screening in Melbourne that night at the Kino, George and Nova cinemas, followed by a party at the Esplanade Hotel, featuring Chris Wilson. From 16 screens it grossed $144,641 in its opening week, placing 13th at the Australian box office. The film did modestly reasonable arthouse business domestically, with the Film Victoria report on Australian box office recording a gross of $519,381. However the film didn’t travel internationally, and now is relatively unknown.

== Filming Locations ==
Melbourne. The story involves a road trip across the Great Nullarbor Plain to Perth and there are some genuine stops along the way, but much of the film was shot in and around Melbourne. The film begins in the inner city suburb of Yarraville, and the outer reaches of Werribee stood in for the Noreseman approach to Perth. The Palms Motel, seen at the end of the trip, is supposed to be in Perth but was actually in Footscray (and still operational in 2026). The Nullarbor/Great Australian Bight scenes were covered in second unit in southern central Australia, while the Hay Plain was also featured in the travelling sequences.
