= Iceandfire =

British charitable organization

iceandfire is a London-based charity. Its stated mission is to explore human rights stories through theatrical performance. It also runs Actors for Human Rights, a network of volunteer actors across the UK.

== History ==
iceandfire was founded in 2003 by playwright Sonja Linden inspired by her seven years as writer in residence at the Medical Foundation for the Care of Victims of Torture (now Freedom from Torture).

Their first theatrical production was I Have Before Me a Remarkable Document Given to me by a Young Lady From Rwanda (2003), which opened at the Finborough Theatre in London and has since been performed across Europe and the United States of America. Other productions are listed below.

Since 2009 the Artistic Director has been Christine Bacon – initially as co-director with Sara Masters and since 2011 as the sole Artistic Director. She is a graduate of Oxford University's Refugee Studies Centre.

== Actors for Human Rights ==
Actors for Human Rights was formerly known as Actors for Refugees. The original network was formed in Melbourne, Australia, in September 2001, in the wake of a series of aggressive and controversial actions by the Australian government towards asylum seekers arriving by boat.

Founding members Alice Garner and Kate Atkinson wanted to use Australian actors to influence community attitudes toward refugees and asylum seekers and to encourage a humanitarian response to their plight.

The UK actors' network was launched in June 2006 at Amnesty International and now consists of well over 300 professional actors and musicians.

The outreach network responds to requests for rehearsed readings of documentary plays and they can go anywhere at any time. The scripts are made up of verbatim accounts from individuals who have suffered human rights abuses.

Because of the simplicity and documentary nature of the scripts, the performances do not need lengthy rehearsal or direction and are simply read out by a constantly changing cast, usually accompanied by a live score.

Juliet Stevenson, Sinéad Cusack, Simon Callow, Dan Stevens (The Line of Beauty), Hayley Atwell (Brideshead Revisited), Thusitha Jayasundera (The Bill), Shobna Gulati (Coronation Street), Shobu Kapoor (EastEnders) and Sam Spruell (London to Brighton) are amongst the professional actors that support the project.

Documentary scripts include Asylum Monologues, Asylum Dialogues, Rendition Monologues, Palestine Monologues, The Illegals, Close to Home: The Cuts, Getting On, On a Clear Day You Can See Dover, Even if we Lose Our Lives and Broke.

== Productions ==
- I Have Before Me a Remarkable Document Given to Me by a Young Lady From Rwanda (2003) by Sonja Linden. This play is about an English writer's friendship with a young woman who survived the Rwandan massacre and is living in London as a refugee and trying to write about her experience. It was published as a play text in 2004 by Aurora Books.
- Crocodile Seeking Refuge (2005) by Sonja Linden
- Welcome to Ramallah (2008) by Sonja Linden and Adah Kay
- Separated (2008) by Sara Masters – education play
- Bind (2009) by Sara Masters and Thomas Churcher – education play
- On the Record (2011) by Christine Bacon and Noah Birksted-Breen
- The Nine O'Clock Slot (2014) by Hannah Davies and Annecy Lax
- Souvenirs (2014) by Christine Bacon – participation project with Freedom from Torture
- The Island Nation (2015) by Christine Bacon
- Flying Circus Airlines (2019) by Amy Ng
