= Fire and Ice =

Fire and Ice may refer to:

== Books and literature ==
- "Fire and Ice" (poem), a 1920 poem by Robert Frost
- Fire and Ice, part of a 1923 translated edition of The Long Journey by Johannes V. Jensen
- Fire and Ice (Hunter novel), a 2003 novel in the Warriors series by Erin Hunter
- Fire & Ice (manga), by Yasuda Tsuyoshi
- Fire and Ice, a 1976 biography of Revlon founder Charles Revson by Andrew Tobias
- Fire and Ice: The Korean War, 1950–1953, a 2000 book by Michael J. Varhola
- Fire (character) and Ice (character), a pair of DC Comics Justice League characters
  - Fire & Ice: Welcome to Smallville and Fire & Ice: When Hell Freezes Over, two limited series featuring the DC characters

== Film ==
- Fire and Ice (French: Le combat dans l'île), a 1962 French film with a screenplay by Jean-Paul Rappeneau
- Fire and Ice (1983 film), a 1983 animated feature film directed by Ralph Bakshi and co-created with Frank Frazetta
- Fire and Ice (1986 film), a 1986 freestyle skiing film directed by Willy Bogner
- Fire and Ice: The Winter War of Finland and Russia, a 2005 American documentary about the Winter War
- Fire and Ice: The Dragon Chronicles, a 2008 television film starring Amy Acker
- Dragons: Fire and Ice, a 2004 children's animated adventure movie
- Fire & Ice (2001 film), a television film starring Lark Voorhies
- The Snow Queen 3: Fire and Ice, a 2016 Russian animated film.

== Games ==
- Fire and Ice (video game), a 1992 computer game originally produced for the Amiga
- Fire 'n Ice or Solomon's Key 2, a 1993 puzzle game for the Nintendo Entertainment System
- Sonic Boom: Fire & Ice, a 2016 action-adventure platform game for the Nintendo 3DS

== Music ==
- Fire + Ice, an English neofolk ensemble founded by Ian Read

=== Albums ===
- Fire & Ice (Cali Agents album) or the title song, 2006
- Fire and Ice (Demis Roussos album) (also released as On the Greek Side of My Mind) or the title song, 1971
- Fire & Ice (Kaskade album), 2011
- Fire and Ice (Steve Camp album) or the title song, 1983
- Fire & Ice (Yngwie Malmsteen album) or the title song, 1992
- Fire & Ice, by Shirley Brown, 1989

=== Songs ===
- "Fire and Ice" (Pat Benatar song), 1981
- "Fire and Ice" (Within Temptation song), 2011
- "Fire & Ice", by Apocalyptica from Cell-0, 2020
- "Fire and Ice", by Bob Catley from The Tower, 1998
- "Fire and Ice", by Cinderella from Long Cold Winter, 1988
- "Fire and Ice", by Eloy from Destination, 1992
- "Fire and Ice", by Marietta Waters from the soundtrack of the film Fire and Ice, 1986
- "Fire and Ice", by Revis from Do We Have to Beg?, 2010/2011 (unreleased)
- "Fire & Ice", by Running Wild from Blazon Stone, 1991
- "Fire N Ice", by Takanashi Kiara with Mori Calliope
- "Fire and Ice", by Thunderstone from Apocalypse Again, 2016
- "Fire and Ice", from the musical Grand Hotel, 1989

== Sports ==
- Fire and Ice, a 1986 skating routine by British ice dancers Torvill and Dean
- Fire and Ice, a professional wrestling tag team composed of Scott Norton and Harold Hogue
- Fire and Ice, a nickname for Chris Corchiani and Rodney Monroe, basketball teammates at N.C. State from 1988 to 1991
- Borg–McEnroe rivalry, in professional tennis, the rivalry of John McEnroe and Björn Borg, nicknamed "Fire and Ice", also the title of 2011 HBO documentary about the pair

== Television episodes ==
- "Fire & Ice" (The Batman)
- "Fire and Ice" (Beverly Hills, 90210)
- "Fire and Ice" (Crossing Jordan)
- "Fire and Ice" (Daigunder)
- "Fire and Ice" (H2O: Just Add Water)
- "Fire and Ice" (MacGyver)
- "Fire & Ice" (Modern Marvels)
- "Fire and Ice" (Now and Again)
- "Fire and Ice" (Pokémon)
- "Fire and Ice" (A Shot at Love II with Tila Tequila)
- "Fire and Ice" (Storm Hawks)
- "Fire and Ice" (Winx Club)

== Other uses ==
- Solanum sisymbriifolium, sticky nightshade, also known as the fire-and-ice plant
- Fire and Ice, a 1952 nail-polish shade and marketing campaign by Revlon
- Dueling Dragons: Fire and Ice, another name for the roller coasters that became the Dragon Challenge for the Wizarding World of Harry Potter
- Methane clathrate: a flammable solid compound also known as "fire ice"

== See also ==
- Ice and Fire (disambiguation)
