= Sophie Heathcote =

Australian actress (1972-2006)

- Born: 25 December 1972; Melbourne, Victoria, Australia
- Died: 4 January 2006 (aged 33); Connecticut, U.S.
- Occupation: Actress
- Years active: 1989–2006
- Spouse: Chris Clarke
- Children: 2

Sophie Heathcote (25 December 1972 – 4 January 2006) was an Australian actress, known for her role in the film Reckless Kelly and for her regular television serial roles, including A Country Practice, Water Rats, and Grass Roots.

== Early life ==
Heathcote was born in Melbourne on 25 December 1972. She graduated from Australia's National Institute of Dramatic Art (NIDA) in late 1994.

== Career ==
Heathcote began her acting career with a regular role in the medical drama series A Country Practice as Stephanie "Steve" Brennan, appearing in 117 episodes from 1990 to 1991. Her early credits included roles in Bordertown, GP, and Soldier Soldier, before taking the ongoing supporting role of Senior Constable Fiona Cassidy in Water Rats (1996–97). This was followed by a role in the Australian Broadcasting Corporation (ABC) series Raw FM (1997), in which she played sexy lesbian dancer Sam. Heathcote said that role challenged her more than anything else she had done since leaving NIDA.

Heathcote won an AFI award in 2000 for her role in ABC's Grass Roots.

== Personal life ==
Along with her husband she established an annual fundraising event that raises $500,000 a year for the neonatal unit at the Royal Children's Hospital. The staff there saved the life of their first child, Madeleine, who is believed to have suffered respiratory problems. The couple moved to the United States in 2005, basing themselves in New York City.

== Death ==
Heathcote died suddenly on 4 January 2006 in Connecticut, reportedly from an aneurysm. She had also been suffering from skin and pancreatic cancer.

Her funeral was held on 18 January 2006 at St Peter's Church in Toorak, Victoria, Australia. She was survived by her husband, their daughter, and their son. Heathcote is buried at Sorrento Cemetery on the Mornington Peninsula.

== Filmography ==
Film and television
Year	Title	Role	Notes
1990	Home and Away	Sonia	Season 3, Episode 12 (#460)
1990–91	A Country Practice	Stephanie 'Steve' Brennan	Main role (series 10–11, 117 episodes)
1992	Bony	Sally	Episode: "Bird in the Hand"
1993	Reckless Kelly	Kathy	
1995	Soldier Soldier	Tara Jenkins	Episode: "Ill Wind"
1995	Bordertown	Peggy	TV miniseries
1995–96	G.P.	Beth Butler	Episodes: "Hide and Seek", "Critical Distances"
1996	Sun on the Stubble	Lottie Gunther	Episode: "Adventures in Paradise"
1996–97	Water Rats	Fiona Cassidy	Supporting role (series 1–2)
1997–98	Raw FM	Sam Kezerko	Main role
1998	State Coroner	Helen Farmer	Episodes: "Days of Reckoning: Parts 1 & 2"
1998	Three Chords and a Wardrobe	Rachel	Short
1999	Pig's Breakfast		TV series
2000	Grass Roots	Biddy Marchant	Main role (series 1)
2001	Abschied in den Tod	Sandy O'Brian	TV film

== See also ==
- Heathcote (surname)
