= Matthew Dyktynski =

Australian actor

Matthew Dyktynski is an Australian actor and comedian, graduating from Australia's National Institute of Dramatic Art in 1992.

== Career ==
=== Television ===
Dyktinski has played lead roles on television series Shock Jock and Raw FM, and has appeared on The Man from Snowy River, Stingers, Blue Heelers, Water Rats, Halifax f.p., All Saints, The Secret Life of Us, House Husbands and Offspring.

=== Film ===
Dyktinski's movie credits include Love and Other Catastrophes (1996), Japanese Story (2003) and Wil (2006), in which he played the title role.

=== Comedian ===
As a comedian, Dyktinski has toured the United Kingdom, Europe and Australia. He spent several years living in London, performing as a regular stand up comic. He has also performed at the Edinburgh Festival and Melbourne International Comedy Festival as well as a sold-out season at London’s Soho Theatre.

=== Radio & voiceover work ===
Dyktinski has undertaken voiceover and narration work, including campaigns for Digital Radio Plus, Kellogg's and Fairfax. He co-hosted Perth’s Mix 94.5 BIG BREAKFAST, for eight years alongside Clairsy and Kymba. His final show was on Friday 15 September 2023.

=== Theatre ===
Dyktinski Is currently working on a musical that he has written together with his wife, called Funeral – The Musical which had its first public reading in August 2023.

== Filmography ==
=== Film ===
| Year | Title | Role | Type |
|---|---|---|---|
| 1996 | Love and Other Catastrophes | Ari | Feature film |
| 1997 | Mr. Nice Guy | Cooking Show Floor Manager | Feature film |
| 1997 | True Love and Chaos | Rusty | Feature film |
| 1997 | Heaven's Burning | Moffat | Feature film |
| 1997 | Road to Nhill | Brett | Feature film |
| 1999 | Dead End | Ben Sykes | Feature film |
| 2000 | Pozieres | Eric Liddy | TV movie |
| 2001 | Sparky D Comes to Town | Ratko | TV movie |
| 2003 | The Referees | Nick | Short film |
| 2003 | Japanese Story | Bill Baird | Feature film |
| 2003 | Takeaway | Burgies Manager | Feature film |
| 2006 | Wil | Wilbur Schindel | Feature film |
| 2010 | A Very Short War | Cliff Carpenter | Documentary film |
| 2010 | Beat | Gordon's friend | Short film |

=== Television ===
| Year | Title | Role | Type |
|---|---|---|---|
| 1994 | G.P. | Eddie | TV series, 1 episode |
| 1996 | The Man from Snowy River | Aaron Jones | TV series, 1 episode |
| 1997-98 | Raw FM | Robert Anderson | TV series, 13 episodes |
| 1998 | State Coroner | Ewan McGregor | TV series, 1 episode |
| 1999 | Stingers | Rob Rosen | TV series, 3 episodes |
| 2000 | Water Rats | Jim Ignatowski | TV series, 2 episodes |
| 1999-2000 | Blue Heelers | Sam Turner / Clayton Saunders | TV series, 2 episodes |
| 2000 | Sit Down, Shut Up | Duke | TV series, 1 episodes |
| 2001 | Horace and Tina | Warwick Bell | TV series, 3 episodes |
| 2001 | Halifax f.p. | Richard Petty | TV series, episode: The Scorpion’s Kiss |
| 2001 | Something in the Air | Paul Danielson | TV series, 2 episodes |
| 2001 | The Bob Downe Show | Guest | TV series, 1 episode |
| 2001-02 | Shock Jock | Barry Gold | TV series, 26 episodes |
| 2002 | Short Cuts | Stuart | TV series, 1 episode |
| 2002 | The Secret Life of Us | Dermot | TV series, 1 episode |
| 2005 | The Voice of God | Joshua | Podcast series |
| 2008 | All Saints | Sebastian Powers | TV series, 1 episode |
| 2010 | Rake | Mr Gardener | TV series, 1 episode |
| 2011 | Rush | Yuri Gringko | TV series, 2 episodes |
| 2012 | Offspring | Tim | TV series, 5 episodes |
| 2012 | Tricky Business | Edward Nugent | TV miniseries, 1 episode |
| 2012 | Lowdown | Lachlan Reid | TV series, 1 episode |
| 2013 | Mr & Mrs Murder | John Roux | TV series, 1 episode |
| 2013 | The Doctor Blake Mysteries | Dr Kenneth Laine | TV series, 1 episode |
| 2014 | House Husbands | Rodge | TV series, 1 episode |
