= Raw FM =

Australian television series (1997-1998)

- Starring: Nadine Garner; Dominic Purcell; Matthew Dyktynski; Sophie Heathcote
- Country of origin: Australia
- No. of seasons: 1
- No. of episodes: 13

Original release
- Network: ABC
- Release: November 1997 – February 1998

Raw FM is an Australian television series produced by the Australian Broadcasting Corporation (the ABC). It aired for one thirteen-episode season between November 1997 and February 1998 and has been re-broadcast. Raw FM is about an independent radio station of the same name and the young people that ran it. Many of the episode titles are word-play on the word raw, such as "Raw 'n' Sore" and "A Raw Nerve".

The cast includes Nadine Garner, Dominic Purcell, Matthew Dyktynski and Sophie Heathcote.

The series has since been repeated by the ABC and was also shown on Channel V.

== Episodes ==
No.	Title	Directed by	Written by	Original release date
1	"What You Can"	Alison Tilson	Aleksi Vellis	18 November 1997
2	"Desperately Seeking Su Lin"	Chris Thompson	Meaghan Smith	25 November 1997
3	"Light My Flame"	Chris Thompson	Jacquelin Perske	2 December 1997
4	"Cara"	Sue Brooks	Glenda Hambly & Judi McCrossin	9 December 1997
5	"Playing with Fire"	Kate Woods	Alison Tilson	16 December 1997
6	"In Arcadia"	Aleksi Vellis	Kate Gillick	22 December 1997
7	"A Raw Nerve"	Ray Argall	Alison Tilson & Ray Argall	30 December 1997
8	"Raw N' Sore"	Moira Moss	Meaghan Smith	6 January 1998
9	"The Facts of Life"	Mick Connolly	Ranald Allan	13 January 1998
10	"B4 and After"	Ray Boseley	David Rapsey & Luke Devenish	17 January 1998
11	"A Raw Deal"	Gregor Jordan	Andrew O'Sullivan & David Rapsey	27 January 1998
12	"Exposure"	Kate Woods	Elise McCredie	3 February 1998
13	"One"	Moira Moss	Ranald Allen	10 February 1998

== Cast ==
=== Main/regular ===
- Dominic Purcell as Granger Hutton
- Nadine Garner as Zelda Lee
- Matthew Dyktynski as Robert Anderson
- Sophie Heathcote as Sam Kezerko
- Dan Spielman as Mark Mullholland
- Amanda Douge as Gerry Sano
- Elena Mandalis as Sarah Tomic
- Joelene Cmogorac as Cara Tomic
- Sudi de Winter as Curtis

=== Guests ===
- Amiel Daemion as Emma (1 episode)
- Bernard Curry as Gary (1 episode)
- Brett Swain as Robert Mills (1 episode)
- Carla Bonner as Erin (1 episode)
- Diana Glenn as Groupie #1 (1 episode)
- Jane Harber as Susan Mulholland (3 episodes)
- Kevin Harrington as Spider (1 episode)
- Kick Gurry as Toby (2 episodes)
- Lachy Hulme as Ruthy (1 episode)
- Maria Papastamatopoulas as Maddi (2 episodes)
- Marieke Hardy as Lucina (1 episode)
- Nicholas Bell as Neil Mullholland (4 episodes)
- Peta Brady as Jemma (1 episode)
- Roz Hammond as Flavia (1 episode)
- Samuel Johnson as Adams (1 episode)
- Shane Connor as Digger (1 episode)
- Sophie Lee as Patty (1 episode)
- Stephen Curry as Ming (1 episode)
- Sullivan Stapleton as Bucky (1 episode)
- Tania Lacy as Laetitia (2 episodes)

== Plot ==
Granger (Dominic Purcell), a DJ at commercial radio station Rock FM is fired from his job, so he and his long-time friends Robert (Matthew Dyktynski) and the blind Zelda (Nadine Garner) decide to start their own independent radio station. However, they are completely unprepared for the number of kids who show up wanting to be DJs – many of whom are quite lazy. They hire a staff from the group of volunteers, and have a launch party. In subsequent episodes, we find out more about each of the staff as different episodes focus on different characters.

== Raw FM Dance Floor Radio ==
Raw FM is also an Australian narrowcast radio network unrelated to the Television series, with stations in New South Wales, Australian Capital Territory, Victoria and Queensland. The commissioning of this series was controversial as the ABC didn't seek input or approval from Raw FM owners at the time.

== See also ==
- List of Australian television series
- Australian Broadcasting Corporation
- Triple J
