= A Very Short War =

- Written by: Susan Young
- Directed by: Myles Conti; Bill Young
- Starring: Bill Young; Matthew Dyktynski; Deborah Kennedy; Kevin Golsby
- Theme music composer: Peter Kaldor
- Country of origin: Australia
- Original language: English

Production
- Producers: Karl Conti; Richard Walker
- Cinematography: Myles Conti
- Editor: Myles Conti
- Running time: 55 minutes

Original release
- Release: 25 April 2010

A Very Short War is a one-hour documentary film produced in 2010 by Karl Conti of Conti Bros Films. It was written by Susan Young and directed by Bill Young and Myles Conti. It was publicly and privately funded, with support from Screen Australia, The History Channel, and NRK2.

== Australian aviator ==
The film follows the life of early Australian aviator Cliff Carpenter who built his first aeroplane in a garage on Military Road, Cremorne, Sydney and died when the RAF Sunderland Flying Boat L2167 from 210 Squadron was shot down over Norway on the day of the German invasion of that country. Susan Young (writer) and Bill Young (co-director) are the niece and nephew of Cliff Carpenter.

Cliff Carpenter's homebuilt monoplane Christmas Day 1932

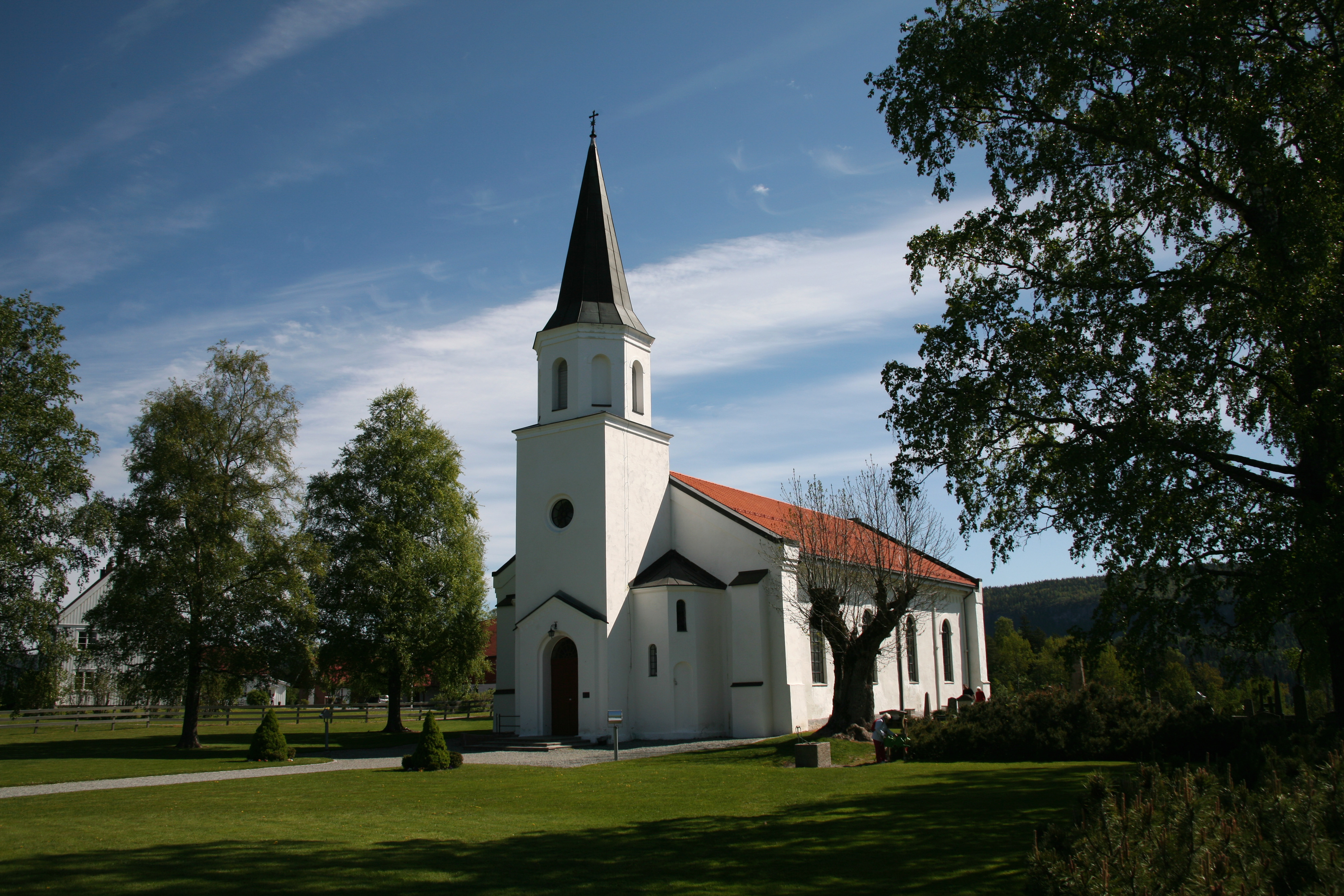
Sylling Church in Buskerud, Norway, where the nine RAF airmen are buried.

Jack Clifford (Cliff) Carpenter - 210 Squadron RAF - 2nd pilot/observer on Sunderland L2167

The nine RAF airmen who died that day, 9 April 1940, were the first Allied servicemen to die in the defense of Norway. They are remembered with a special ceremony each year at their graves in the Sylling churchyard, 25 km west of Oslo. There was one survivor – Welshman Ogwyn George, the radio operator – who fell 3,000 feet (900 m) without a parachute, hitting trees and landing in unusually deep snow. He was rescued by Norwegian Johan Bråthen. The mission in the RAF Sunderland Flying Boat L2167 of 210 Squadron was a volunteer mission. A crew of ten were assembled:

AC2 George Eveson (29) of Wales)
AC1 Robert (Bertie) L Millar (18) of Northern Ireland
AC1 Graeme H Maile (22) of Wales)
AC1 Ogwyn George (1919–1986) of Wales (survivor)
LAC Douglas W B Upham (27) (Kent, England)
LAC Frederick A Morrison (30) (Northern Ireland)
Sgt James A L Barter (21) (Monmouth, Wales)
Sgt Pilot J C Carpenter (28) (Sydney, Australia)
PLTOFF Arthur F LeMaistre (26) (Winnipeg, Canada)
FLTLT Peter W H Kite (20) (London, England) - Captain

They left on 8 April 1940 in Sunderland L2168 and flew north from Pembroke Dock on the south west tip of Wales to Holyhead in north Wales and overnighted there. The next morning they flew to Invergordon in Scotland where, for what was believed to be a mechanical problem, they changed aeroplane to Sunderland L2167. They took off at 1pm and opened sealed orders to learn of their destination - Oslo, Norway. Mission - general reconnaissance. According to the one survivor, Ogwyn George, the crew had no knowledge that Germany had invaded Norway on that day. The Sunderland arrived over Oslo around 5.30pm and was hit by flak from German ships in Oslo Harbour. The pilot turned the Sunderland north-west to escape but was pursued and fired upon by two Messerschmitt Bf 110s piloted by Oblt Werner Hansen and Oblt Helmut Lent. The Sunderland exploded and crashed in the mountains of Overskogen north of the village of Sylling.

Helmut Lent went on to become a Luftwaffe nightfighter ace with 110 kills to his credit. He was killed in a landing accident in 1944 and was given a state funeral, presided over by Reichsmarschall Hermann Göring. Werner Hansen was shot down and killed by own flak in 1941.

The story of the invasion of Norway on 9 April 1940 is detailed by Norwegian writer Cato Guhnfeldt in his book Fornebu 9. april, published by Wings, 1990. A vivid account of the fate of Sunderland L2167 is included in this book.

== Last interview with Nancy-Bird Walton ==
The documentary includes an interview with legendary Australian aviator Nancy Bird Walton, who flew with Cliff Carpenter and got lost over Bass Strait whilst trying to locate King Island. They eventually made landfall back in Victoria near Geelong, desperately short of fuel. The interview, recorded in September 2008, lasted 45 minutes and is the last extensive interview given by Walton before her death on 13 January 2009.
