= Storm Hawks =

Canadian animated television series

- Promotional image featuring Aerrow and his co-pilot,Radarr.
- Genre: Action; Adventure; Science fantasy; Dramedy
- Created by: Asaph Fipke
- Directed by: Asaph Fipke; Steve Ball
- Voices of: Sam Vincent; Matt Hill; Colin Murdock; Chiara Zanni; Scott McNeil; Lenore Zann; Cathy Weseluck
- Theme music composer: Bob Buckley; Asaph Fipke
- Composer: Bob Buckley
- Country of origin: Canada
- Original language: English
- No. of seasons: 2
- No. of episodes: 52 (list of episodes)

Production
- Executive producers: Asaph Fipke; Ken Faier
- Producer: Chuck Johnson
- Running time: 22 minutes
- Production company: Nerd Corps Entertainment

Original release
- Network: YTV
- Release: May 25, 2007 – April 6, 2009

Storm Hawks is a Canadian animated television series created by Asaph Fipke and produced by Nerd Corps Entertainment. It premiered on Cartoon Network in the United States on May 25, 2007, and on YTV in Canada on September 8, 2007.

== Plot ==
| Season | Episodes | Originally aired | |
| Season | Episodes | First aired | Last aired |
|---|---|---|---|
| 1 | 26 | May 25, 2007 | December 10, 2007 |
| 2 | 26 | September 6, 2008 | April 6, 2009 |

Atmos. World of a thousand mountaintop kingdoms, each protected by a Sky Knight against the forces of darkness: beasts, rogues, and worst of all, Cyclonians. The greatest of all Sky Knights led the Storm Hawks. His mission: unite the kingdoms and rid Atmos of evil forever. But he was betrayed, the Storm Hawks defeated, and all hope lost... Until now. I'm Aerrow, the last descendant of the original Storm Hawks, and I've been given their mission. This is my squadron: Finn, the marksman, Junko, the strongman, Piper, the specialist, Stork, the helmsman, and of course, my copilot Radarr. We're the Storm Hawks, and for us, the sky is never the limit.

— Aerrow's narration during the opening sequence

Storm Hawks is set on a fictional world called Atmos, a largely mountainous world consisting of scattered, towering, plateau-like land masses known as terras. Directly below the terras lie the Wastelands, the most dangerous area of Atmos, with infernal fires and wicked creatures. Because of the geography, travel is mostly dependent on flight. The technology of Atmos is based around energy-generating crystals, used to power the various devices in the series. Patrolling the skies of Atmos are the Squadrons, groups of warriors who pilot motorcycle-like vehicles called Skimmers that can semi-transform into flying machines. Each Squadron is led by a Sky Knight, and these warriors are loosely managed by the Sky Knight Council.

In the backstory of the series, an evil ruler named Master Cyclonis and her servants, the Cyclonians, threatened Atmos. The original Storm Hawks rallied the other Squadrons against this enemy, but were betrayed and defeated by one of their own (later known as The Dark Ace). Ten years later, the main characters of the series stumble upon the wreckage of the Storm Hawks' carrier, the Condor, and unofficially take on the Storm Hawks name in the hopes of becoming Sky Knights themselves, despite not being old enough to even legally fly the vehicle. Their youth defeats their ambition, however, as neither friend nor foe take them seriously because of it.

This changes when they are brought into conflict with a new Master Cyclonis, granddaughter of the previous one. Among her followers are the Dark Ace, the man who betrayed the original Storm Hawks and now serves Cyclonis as her right-hand man; Snipe, a mace-wielding strongman with a fondness for smashing things; and Snipe's sister, Ravess, an archer who always brings violin-playing henchmen into battle for theme music.

The series recounts the adventures of the Storm Hawks as they battle against Cyclonia for the fate of the Atmos, while having many adventures along the way.

== Characters ==
=== Main ===
From left to right: Radarr, Stork, Aerrow, Piper, Finn, and Junko.

The Storm Hawks squadron consists of six members:

- Aerrow (voiced by Sam Vincent) — The daring leader and Sky Knight of the squadron, Aerrow is a mature, good-natured teenager with a tousled mop of bright red hair and emerald green eyes. Despite his youth, he's one of the most talented Sky Knights in the Atmos, to the point that he can beat the Dark Ace in hand-to-hand combat. Looking at the whole Squadron together, Aerrow and Stork seem to be the tallest, approximately in the 6 foot range. At the end of the show, he risks his own life in order to protect his beloved Atmos, but survives.
- Finn (voiced by Matt Hill) — A wiry, wise-cracking guy, Finn is a sharpshooter with spiky blond hair and blue eyes. Finn seems to be on a perpetual sugar rush, although he attempts to act cool and collected. His personality traits are like a stereotypical surfer and/or skater. His passions are playing air guitar and flirting with girls, though he's successful at neither. He and Junko are always getting into trouble together, thus serving as the comic relief pair of the show. A running gag of the show is Finn getting his Skimmer cut in half during battle and then painfully landing on another vehicle.
- Junko (voiced by Colin Murdock) — A large, albeit gentle and good-natured person, Junko is a member of a species known as Wallops. He has greenish-blue hair, grey eyes and his appearance is similar to that of a brown anthropomorphized rhino. As the muscle of the Storm Hawks he possesses superhuman strength that is greatly increased by the use of his preferred weapons, the Knuckle Busters. Junko is a "gentle giant" type who, despite his power, is nonviolent and a little goofy, focused mainly on food.
- Piper (voiced by Chiara Zanni) — In charge of tactics, navigation, and crystals, Piper has an excellent combat ability, and knows nearly everything about Atmos and its inhabitants (not to mention she has a quirky, yet outspoken attitude). She has spiky midnight blue hair, orange eyes and is the only character to take on Master Cyclonis alone and emerge triumphant through her own skills.
- Stork (voiced by Scott McNeil) — The carrier pilot character and a gadget specialist with crippling paranoia and severe pessimism. Stork is a member of a species of green-skinned creatures called "Merbs". Though he appears menacing at first, he is easily frightened and meek, but in spite of that he consistently performs his expected duties. He deeply loves the Hawks' battle cruiser, the Condor, and is devoted to her safety almost as much as to his own. He has stated that he is only a member of the Storm Hawks until "something better comes along", but in truth is very much loyal and loves and cares about his teammates. He has jet-black hair and yellow eyes with dots for pupils. Looking at the whole Squadron together, Aerrow and Stork seem to be the tallest. Radarr comes up to about Aerrow's hip; most people believe Radarr is around 3 feet and some odd inches, making it possible for Aerrow and Stork to be in the 6 foot range.
- Radarr (voiced by Asaph Fipke) — Aerrow's close friend and co-pilot, Radarr is a vaguely rabbit/lemur-like creature of indeterminate origin (though bears a noticeable resemblance to the Blizzarians) and hates being called a "pet". Radarr has scruffy blue fur and yellow eyes.

=== Recurring ===
- Master Cyclonis (voiced by Lenore Zann) — The main antagonist of the show. The young ruler of Cyclonia who aims to conquer Atmos.
- Dark Ace (voiced by Sam Vincent) — Cyclonis' right-hand man. Aerrow's arch-rival who betrayed the original Storm Hawks. He killed their Sky Knight, Lightning Strike, and now wields his sword.
- Snipe (voiced by Colin Murdock) — A Cyclonian commander and strong man who fights brutishly with a mace.
- Ravess (voiced by Cathy Weseluck) — A Cyclonian commander known for her archery skills and violin theme music. She is Snipe's sister.
- Repton (voiced by Scott McNeil) — The ruthless leader of the Raptors, a rogue squadron of humanoid lizards that lives on Terra Bogaton. He has killed the Sky Knight squadron of Terra Mesa known as the Interceptors, with their Sky Knight being the only survivor.
- Starling (voiced by Nicole Oliver) — A Sky Knight of the Interceptors whose squadron was brought down by Repton. She speaks with an English accent.
- I.J. Domiwick (voiced by Mark Oliver) — A famous explorer who seeks for the Forbidden City. He was Piper's idol.
- Captain Scabulous (voiced by Mark Oliver) — A relentless and vicious sky pirate who is the leader of the Murk Raiders. He lives in Terra Deep, a foggy area full of wrecked airships.
- Carver (voiced by Brian Drummond) — A traitorous Sky Knight of the Red Eagles who attempted to claim the Aurora Stone to appease the Cyclonians, thinking that Atmos doesn't stand a chance against them.
- Tritonn (voiced by Scott McNeil) — A Sky Knight of the Neck Deeps who lives on Terra Aquanos.
- Mr. Moss (voiced by Mark Oliver) — The Cyclonian warden of Terra Zartacla.
- The Colonel (voiced by Mark Oliver) — A spider-like gangster who speaks with a Spanish accent.
- Wren (voiced by Lee Tockar) — A resident of Terra Gale who speaks with a French accent.

== Reception ==
Common Sense Media gave the series three out of five stars, stating "Tweens -- especially thrill-seeking boys -- are sure to enjoy the Storm Hawks' high-flying adventures, and parents can rest assured that, aside from the prevalence of typical cartoon peril (extensive falls, midair collisions, etc.) that never seems to cause lasting injury, there's not much to be concerned about. That said, there aren't too many overwhelmingly positive messages or strong role models. But on the whole, it's a cartoon vacation for the brain that kids and tweens will welcome and parents shouldn't fret over."

In another review by Jeffrey Harris of IGN, Harris states that "For an animated kids show, Storm Hawks is OK. However, it's somewhat difficult to get wrapped in the story since it plays for laughs and cheap, dumb comedy. The stakes of the story never really feel serious or all important. When you look at other animated action/adventure cartoons such as Avatar: The Last Airbender today, which contains superior storytelling, it's harder to get into a story such as Storm Hawks. There's nothing particularly interesting or cool about any of the characters. Aerrow seems to desire recognition and respect over helping people. Stork is a bit of a cowardly lion type, and usually opts to stay out of battle with the other Storm Hawks while he pilots their airbase the condor. Despite that, Stork turns out to be one of the more genuine, funny, and interesting characters, at least an extreme opposite to the rather plucky and flat personalities of the other Storm Hawks."

== In other media ==
=== Comic books ===
In May 2009, DMF Comics and Beach Creative Studios were reported to be working on a comic book series for Storm Hawks. At the March Toronto Anime Con 2009, 50 "ashcan" copies of a special issue #1 were distributed. It featured one story, a short story, and a few pin-ups by various artists. In July 2009, the book was made available to dealers for September release. Only Issue #1 was published.

A mini Storm Hawks comic book entitled "Storm Hawks: The Escape" is included free with the region 2 release of the Storm Hawks Season 1 Volume 1 DVD.

=== SkyRace video game ===
A MMORPG called Storm Hawks: Skyrace was developed by Bitcasters utilizing BigWorld Technology, a middleware game engine. On November 7, 2008, the RPG was announced to be in beta. However, by August 5, 2011, the game was taken down and is no longer available to play.

The game was available to play for an amount of time on the Nerd Corps website, but the site no longer exists. Nerd Corps was bought out by DHX Media in 2014, and the name "Nerd Corps" was completely phased out of use by 2016.

==== Beta ====
The game was launched for beta testing in Australia on December 16, 2008, but was only available for Australians. It was available on the official Storm Hawks website on YTV, but the site no longer exists.
