= Emma-Kate Croghan =

Australian director and writer

Emma-Kate Croghan is an Australian film director and writer, known for her films Love and Other Catastrophes (1996) and Strange Planet (1999). The former was critically acclaimed and well-liked by audiences.

She moved to the United States in 2000, and as of May 2005 was living in New York City with her husband and two children.

== See also ==
- List of female film and television directors
- List of LGBT-related films directed by women
