= Alice Garner =

Australian actress

- Born: Alice Miriam Olivia Garner; Melbourne, Victoria, Australia
- Education: University of Melbourne (Ph.D.)
- Occupations: Actress; author; musician; historian; teacher
- Parent: Helen Garner (mother)

Alice Miriam Olivia Garner is an Australian actor, author, musician, teacher and historian.

She is the daughter of Australian novelist and screenwriter Helen Garner and playwright, historian and actor Bill Garner.

== Acting life and career ==
Garner's acting career began as a child in the 1982 film Monkey Grip adapted from her mother's 1977 novel of the same name, which Alice featured in as a character, under the name of Gracie. She was nominated for an AFI Award for her role. She starred in Love And Other Catastrophes in 1996, winning the Film Critics Circle of Australia award for best supporting actress, and played the role of Carmen in the popular ABC TV series SeaChange. Other credits include films Jindabyne, Strange Planet and award-winning short film Maidenhead, and on television, the role of Caitlin in Secret Life of Us.

In September 2001, she and Kate Atkinson (with whom she had worked on SeaChange) founded Actors for Refugees, to counter negative stereotyping of refugees and asylum seekers through public readings by volunteer performers around Australia.

In 2014, she joined a team of presenters on three series of a television documentary series about the Australian coastline, Coast Australia (History Channel), hosted by archaeologist Neil Oliver. Garner presented stories about social and cultural history.

== Academic life and career ==
Garner speaks French and in 2001 gained a Ph.D. in French history from the University of Melbourne for her study of representations of sea and shore in south-western France. In August 2005, Garner was appointed as a Vice-Chancellor's Fellow at the university.

Garner held an ARC Linkage postdoctoral research fellowship at La Trobe University from 2009 to 2012, researching the history of the Australian-American Fulbright Program. As part of this project, Garner recorded 23 whole-of-life interviews with Fulbright scholars for the National Library of Australia's oral history and folklore collection.

She has published three books:

- The Student Chronicles (MUP 2006), a memoir of her undergraduate years at Melbourne University
- A Shifting Shore: Locals, Outsiders, and the Transformation of a French Fishing Town, 1823–2000 (Cornell University Press, 2005), which was shortlisted for the NSW Premier's General History Prize in the year it was published.
- With historian Diane Kirkby, she co-authored Academic Ambassadors, Pacific Allies: Australia, America and the Fulbright Program (Manchester University Press, 2018).

Since January 2020, Garner has been based in the Centre for Vocational and Educational Policy at the Melbourne Graduate School of Education (University of Melbourne), researching the history of trade union training in Australia for an ARC Linkage project, bringing together historians, vocational educationalists and industrial law experts. She has also worked on projects relating to digital exclusion (2022–23) and diversity in the teacher workforce (2023).

In 2022, Garner was awarded an ANU Australian Studies Institute Visiting Fellowship and in 2023, a National Library of Australia research fellowship, to research the life and times of Mavis Robertson AM.

== Teaching ==
Garner became involved in community actions to support her local government secondary school and this inspired her to train in secondary teaching at Victoria University (2013-2014). She worked as a French and History teacher at Albert Park College from 2015 to 2019 and co-led the Languages curriculum team with colleague Tasha Brown.

== Music life ==
Garner has been playing cello since the age of 10, and was a long-time member of the Xylouris Ensemble. The ensemble, led by Giorgos Xylouris on Laouto, performed contemporary, original and traditional Cretan music and released several studio albums.

Garner currently plays in a trio, Sunshine Tip (formerly The Endlings), with David Bowers and Dee Hannan, and has also played the euphonia with Mairead Hannan and Dee Hannan.

== Awards ==
- 1982 – nominated for the Australian Film Institute Award for Best Actress in a Supporting Role, for Monkey Grip
- 1996 – nominated for the Australian Film Institute Awards, Best Actress in a Supporting Role for Love and Other Catastrophes
- 1997 – won Film Critics Circle of Australia Award for Best Supporting Actor – Female, for Love and Other Catastrophes
- 2002 – won the Screen Music Awards, Australia for Best Soundtrack Album, for One Night the Moon shared with Mairead Hannan, Paul Kelly, Kev Carmody, John Romeril, Deirdre Hannan
- 2005 – shortlisted for the New South Wales Premier's History Awards General History Prize for A Shifting Shore: locals, outsiders and the transformation of a French fishing town, 1823–2000
- 2015 – Victoria University Medal for Excellence in Postgraduate Studies

== Personal life ==
Garner is married and has three children.

== Filmography ==
=== Film ===
Year	Title	Role	Notes
1982	Monkey Grip	Gracie	
1989	Lover Boy	Rhonda	
1993	The Nostradamus Kid	Esther Anderson	
1995	Maidenhead	Alice	Short
1996	Love and Other Catastrophes	Alice	
1999	Strange Planet	Sally	
2006	Jindabyne	Elissa	
2012	Jack & Lily	Jack's Mum	Short

=== Television ===
Year	Title	Role	Notes
1988	C/o The Bartons	Vivienne Bone	Episode: "Beautiful Beetroot"
1989–90	The Flying Doctors	Alice Jenkins, Kimm Rowlands	Episodes: "The Child", "Double Vision"
1990	Embassy	Faridah	Episode: "Foreign Affairs"
1998–2000	SeaChange	Carmen Blake	Recurring role (series 1–3)
2001–02	The Secret Life of Us	Caitlin	Recurring role (series 1–2)
2002	Short Cuts	Moira	Episode: "Crash and Burn"
2002	Shock Jock	Charlene	Episode: "The Chat-A-Van"
2011	Utopia Girls	Caroline Dexter	
2014–2018	Coast Australia	Presenter	Series 2-4 regular

== Bibliography ==
- A Shifting Shore: Locals, Outsiders, And The Transformation Of A French Fishing Town, 1823–2000, Cornell University Press, published 31 January 2005, ISBN 0-8014-4282-6.
- The Student Chronicles, Melbourne University Publishing, 2006
- Co-authored with Diane Kirkby, Academic Ambassadors, Pacific Allies: Australia, America and the Fulbright Program (Manchester University Press, 2018)
