= List of Storm Hawks episodes =

The following is a list of episodes for the Canadian animated television series Storm Hawks. The series first aired on May 25, 2007, ran for two seasons, and ended on April 6, 2009.

== Series overview ==
Season	Episodes	Originally aired	
Season	Episodes	First aired	Last aired
1	26	May 25, 2007	December 10, 2007
2	26	September 6, 2008	April 6, 2009

== Episodes ==
=== Season 1 (2007) ===
No.	Title	Written by	Original release date	Prod. code
1	"Age of Heroes (Part 1)"	Rob Hoegee	May 25, 2007	101
The Storm Hawks head to the capital of Atmos, Terra Atmosia, to register as an official Sky Knight squadron, only to be rejected because of Aerrow's age. Shortly thereafter, the leader of Atmosia's Red Eagles Squadron, Carver, tries to steal the Aurora Stone, the most powerful crystal in Atmos, from the beaconing tower to bring to the Cyclonians as he believes the Squadrons will lose the coming war. Although Aerrow is able to defeat him, things go from bad to worse when Master Cyclonis sends the Dark Ace to finish Carver's mission. Aerrow faces his first battle with the Dark Ace and loses. The Dark Ace then allows Aerrow to live so Aerrow can savour his defeat. Despite putting up a good fight, the Storm Hawks are unable to fend off the fleet of Cyclonians. Aerrow and the Storm Hawks then decide to go to Cyclonia and get the Aurora Stone back from Cyclonis themselves.
2	"Age of Heroes (Part 2)"	Rob Hoegee	June 1, 2007	102
With the Aurora Stone stolen, every Sky Knight in Atmos joins forces to retrieve it, only to fail miserably when the Dark Ace uses its power against them. Using the crystal to power her Storm Engine, Master Cyclonis plans to wipe out every terra in Atmos simultaneously. The Storm Hawks mount their own mission to retrieve the crystal, opting to use stealth over brute force. While the rest of his team sneaks in through Cyclonia's many underground passages, Aerrow provides a distraction on the outside, defeating Master Cyclonis' minions one by one, even the Dark Ace. Within the fortress, the team is aided by Starling, a lone Sky Knight who had infiltrated the Cyclonian ranks before the stone was even stolen. Ultimately, Aerrow is forced to destroy the Aurora Stone to stop the Storm Engine, but with Starling's testimony this is considered an acceptable loss. Unfortunately, their age still prevents the Storm Hawks from registering as an official squadron, though this no longer bothers them, as they vow to protect Atmos no matter what. As they leave, the senior high councilor softly wishes Aerrow luck, having personally comes to appreciate the new Storm Hawks.
3	"Gale Force Winds"	Steve Ball	June 8, 2007	103
During a scouting mission into the Cyclonian-controlled Terra Gale, the Storm Hawks take on a mission to rescue the granddaughter of an old man from the Cyclonians. When they find her they are forced into rescuing The Rebel Ducks, Terra Gale's imprisoned Sky Knight squadron, as well. The Storm Hawks then battle the Dark Ace and force him to flee the battle when he gets surrounded by the Storm Hawks, The Rebel Ducks and the Condor. The Storm Hawks are then rewarded with a Windstone Crystal by Dove and her grandfather.
4	"The Code"	Richard Elliott and Simon Racioppa	June 15, 2007	104
While attempting to procure a Phoenix Crystal from a phoenix nest, the Storm Hawks have their prize stolen by the Rex Guardians squadron of Terra Rex. When their leader, Harrier, suggests that the Storm Hawks could always issue a challenge to obtain the crystal, Aerrow gladly agrees in order to prove to the Guardians that the Storm Hawks are not just a group of kids pretending to be a squadron. However, the Storm Hawks find themselves in a bad position to win when faced with the Rex Guardians' insistence on adhering to proper etiquette and their ridiculously strict code of rules, and lose the challenge through technicalities, despite their victories. To make things worse, Harrier hands the Phoenix Crystal over to the Dark Ace in an attempt to placate Cyclonia. The Dark Ace, of course, does not honor the deal, and announces that the Cyclonians will be invading despite the offering. A battle ensues, but the Guardians quickly discover their honorable traditions mean nothing to someone who has no honor. When the Storm Hawks succeed where they failed, Harrier agrees to take some pointers from them.
5	"Tranquility Now"	Matt Wayne	June 18, 2007	105
Cyclonians Ravess and Snipe attack Terra Glockenchime, shutting down the time-pulse, the primary navigation signal for every airship in Atmos. At the same time, Finn accidentally drops Junko's knuckle busters into the Wastelands while trying them on, which leads to the revelation that Junko is one of the kinder, smarter Wallops, and he always got picked on as a kid because of this until his aunt gave him his signature weapons. The loss of his busters causes a massive loss of self-esteem, and hampers his ability to fight when the Storm Hawks go to stop Ravess and Snipe. Junko's faith in himself is rekindled after Snipe calls him a Gleep, a taunt used against him as a child. His confidence restored, Junko knocks Snipe out and restores the time-pulse. At the end of the episode, Finn retrieves Junko's knuckle busters from the Wastelands at great personal risk as an apology.
6	"Best Friends Forever"	Amy Wolfram	June 25, 2007	106
During a storm, Piper is saved by another crystal expert like herself named Lark, and the two become best friends. However, during a recon mission to a Cyclonian crystal mine in the terra tundras, Piper discovers her new friend is Master Cyclonis in disguise, having infiltrated the Storm Hawks in the hopes of turning Piper to her side. Unable to do so, Master Cyclonis uses the mined crystals to turn an entire Talon squadron invisible. Using some unorthodox tactics, the Storm Hawks defeat their invisible assailants, while Piper defeats Master Cyclonis.
7	"The Black Gorge"	Eric Hayden	July 2, 2007	107
While taking a shortcut over the Black Gorge, the Storm Hawks are stranded by its crystal-draining energy field. In order to restore power and escape, the Storm Hawks set out for the one spot in the Black Gorge where sunlight can be found for a few seconds each year, in order to power a Solaris Crystal with it. Led by an unwilling Stork and a cute native animal, the Storm Hawks avoid one horrible monster after another until they reach sunlight, only to find that it transforms their animal guide and a herd of creatures like him into massive angry sloths. Fortunately, all the horrors of the gorge are no less hostile to the sloths themselves, allowing the Storm Hawks to escape.
8	"Absolute Power"	Eric Hayden	July 9, 2007	108
Aerrow goes off on a secret mission with Starling to Terra Bogaton, leaving Finn in charge of the Condor. While Aerrow and Starling fight off the Raptors to rescue a group of peaceful scientists, Finn goes power-mad and banishes his teammates from the bridge for disobeying his many orders. To teach him a lesson, the others mess with the ship's systems, convincing Finn to relinquish control of everyone and the ship. Their uprising is well-timed: the scientists have a map of Bogaton's supposedly impenetrable air-defense, and Finn's the perfect man to take them all out. While Aerrow escorts the scientists out of Bogaton under cover fire from Finn, Starling battles Repton for the shield belonging to the Interceptors, her former squadron which Repton destroyed. Once the shield is retrieved and the scientists are safe, Aerrow reminds Starling that she's always welcome to join the Storm Hawks.
9	"Velocity"	Scott Sonneborn	July 16, 2007	109
During the annual Great Atmos Race on Terra Saharr for a rare Velocity Amulet, a mysterious rider convinces every contestant to soup up their vehicle with any and every part available, including the vehicles of their friends and even parts from their carriers. As the race begins, the riders are eliminated one by one, with the mysterious rider revealing himself to be the Dark Ace in disguise. Though Aerrow wins the race, the Dark Ace points out that Aerrow now has the only working vehicle on the terra, making the grounded Sky Knights easy pickings for his Talons. While Aerrow tries to hold off the Cyclonian forces on his own, Piper convinces everyone else to work together, cobbling together a massive and heavily armed gunship from every spare part they have left to repel the Cyclonians. Piper defeats the Dark Ace when she shoots down his skimmer. In order to celebrate their teamwork, Aerrow shatters the Velocity Amulet so every squadron can go home with a piece of it.
10	"Fire and Ice"	Steve Ball	July 23, 2007	110
Repton takes his Raptors to a secret reptile paradise, only to find that the Blizzarians have frozen it over, their previous home having been conquered by the Cyclonians. In order to teach them a lesson, the Raptors begin throwing heat-producing crystals into a nearby volcano, only to be discovered by Stork. Meanwhile, the male members of the Absolute Zeroes offer to do some training with the Storm Hawks, but insist that Piper stay behind with the females of their squadron. Piper quickly discovers that this is not because they look down on her, but in fact seem to think she's the leader, since their squadron leader, Suzi-Lu, is also female. When one of Repton's minions accidentally sets off the volcano, Piper convinces Suzi-Lu to sacrifice her Blizzard Crystal to stop it. With the threat over, the Storm Hawks promise to liberate the Blizzarians' original home, and the Raptors are stranded on a frozen terra with their vehicles melted by the lava.
11	"King For a Day"	Eugene Son	July 30, 2007	111
When the Storm Hawks stumble upon the long lost Terra Vapos, Finn is declared to be the long lost hero of their prophecy, something he couldn't be happier about. However, when he discovers that an army of humanoid bats is stealing all their supplies, he offers to defeat them all by himself, just as the prophecy says. As he leaves, Piper learns that Finn hasn't been given the entire story: Finn isn't supposed to defeat them, he is to be eaten by the head bat. They prepare to go after them, but the people of Vapos, fearing the bats will stop only when Finn is eaten, toss them in jail. Sure enough, Finn is eaten by the bat, but the story doesn't end there. Finn escapes by lighting a flare, then causes a cave-in to trap the bats forever, with Aerrow, having escaped, arriving just in time to fly both of them to safety. With the bats gone, Vapos can become prosperous again.
12	"Terra Deep"	Eric Hayden	August 13, 2007	112
While attempting to evade a Cyclonian fleet, the Storm Hawks inadvertently flee into Terra Deep. Realizing their location just a bit too late, they are forced to play a game of Cat and Mouse with the Murk Raiders, ship-raiding sky pirates. Despite their efforts, the Storm Hawks can't evade the Raiders on their home turf, and the Murk Raiders are successful in boarding their ship. However, the Murk Raiders aren't quite up to the task of subduing a Sky Knight squadron, and are repelled with relative ease. Not willing to give up after such a failure, the Murk Raiders summon two more ships to pursue the Storm Hawks. Luckily for the Storm Hawks, the Murk Raiders find much more appealing targets when led out of Terra Deep, where three massive Cyclonian carriers are waiting to be picked clean.
13	"Storm Warning"	Rob Hoegee	August 20, 2007	113
During a spy mission on Terra Amazonia, Finn deviates from Piper's step-by-step plan and steals an entire crate of crystals from a group of Cyclonians under Ravess' command. Annoyed, Piper insists that they wouldn't last a day without her, and sets out to prove it by pretending to quit. Stork discovers her trick, and the others do their best to get along just to ruin her plan. However, they fail to realize that the crate Finn stole is full of leech crystals, which are slowly draining the ship of its power and will explode after doing so. Once the drain is nearly complete, Ravess orders an attack on the Storm Hawks to take advantage of their weakness, leaving Piper the only one aware of the true nature of the crystals. With her help, Stork is able to dispose of the crystals while the rest of the team repels Ravess. With both sides convinced that they can't do without one another, the Storm Hawks make up, just in time for Stork to admit that he stored the leechers in Piper's crystal shielder in her room, which now has a nice, big window from the explosion.
14	"A Little Trouble"	Alexx Van Dyne	September 1, 2007	114
The Storm Hawks have to babysit Junko's nephew (twice removed), Tynki. Meanwhile, Snipe is building a larger and even more destructive version of a Cyclonian Destroyer, which when completed will allow him to dominate the skies. As they prepare to take it down, Tynki's curiosity combined with his ridiculous Wallop strength make the little child a terror for the Storm Hawks crew. To make matters worse, when they finally begin their mission to disable the battleship, Tynki finds his way on board, innocently wrecking everything he can get his little hands on. However, his spree of destruction turns out to be beneficial, as he inadvertently helps to shut down the ship, causing it to plummet into the Wastelands.
15	"Thunder Run"	Scott Sonneborn	September 15, 2007	115
Junko is taken hostage by a spider-like gangster known as the Colonel, and the Storm Hawks have until sundown to retrieve some "rozen yoga" from the other end of Atmos that will pay the ransom. As they set out on their mission, Junko gets into an eating contest with the Colonel. To give the Condor an extra burst of speed, Finn steals a Velocity crystal from the Raptors, bringing the wrath of Repton down upon them. Dumping parts to lighten the ship similarly angers a group of phoenixes. They even have to pass through Cyclonian territory to make it in time. All of this turns out to be in pursuit of what is actually frozen yogurt, the strange name a result of the Colonel's accent. Furthermore, Junko beats the Colonel at an eating contest, and eats the yogurt when it's delivered. Upset by the trivial goal of their dangerous journey, Piper insults the Colonel and he insists on another mission with an even smaller timeframe.
16	"Escape!"	Eric Hayden	September 22, 2007	116
Aerrow and Radarr have to break out of the escape-proof Cyclonian prison on Terra Zartacla. However, with no ride to escape on, and the jail warden Mr. Moss on their tail, such a feat is easier said than done. As they repeatedly avoid Moss and his guards, Moss calls more and more help in to catch them. Radarr manages to fix a broken vehicle left in the trees so they can escape, and Moss realizes that the whole affair was just a distraction to allow the Storm Hawks to break the other prisoners out.
17	"Forbidden City"	Eugene Son	September 29, 2007	117
The Storm Hawks must stop Domiwick, a pompous explorer, from breaking into an ancient city which contains the Oracle Stone, a crystal that can see the future. Braving the many traps, hazards, and Cyclonians, Aerrow eventually finds the stone. There, the Oracle, whose spirit dwells within the stone, shows him the future: the Cyclonians win. However, she offers him the chance to change that future by freeing her. Aerrow does so, and taking the now worthless stone along, he and the Storm Hawks escape the temple, leaving Snipe with nothing. He presents the stone to Piper as a gift. And in this particular episode, Stork even comes along for the trip so he can, "learn much" from the death traps an hazards of the Forbidden City.
18	"Leviathan"	Paul Giacoppo	October 6, 2007	118
When the Condor and Radarr are swallowed by the terra-sized beast known as the Leviathan, the Storm Hawks find themselves unable to fight the beast, forcing them to team up with a reluctant Sky Knight (whose crew and only brother had already been swallowed) to get their home back. Stork, meanwhile, goes into "Sky Shock" after witnessing the Condor being eaten firsthand. With Stork's shock-driven bravery and a replacement ship loaned to them by the Sky Knight, the Storm Hawks are able to get their home back. At the same time, they inadvertently discover how to repel the beast, ensuring that it will never attack any ships again.
19	"Infinnity"	Alexx Van Dyne	November 7, 2007	119
The Storm Hawks steal an artifact from Snipe, which Finn inadvertently activates. He soon discovers that it houses a crystal that clones him, which he and his clones use over and over to complete all their chores all over the ship. Before Piper can reverse the effect, Snipe takes the crystal back and creates an army of clones. Using his own pride against him, the Storm Hawks distract Snipe long enough to steal back the crystal and reverse the effect, returning both Snipe and Finn to single versions of themselves.
20	"Terra Neon"	Scott Sonneborn	November 30, 2007	120
During a vacation on Terra Neon, the Storm Hawks discover the normally active carnival terra devoid of life, except for a single place holding auditions for a show. They soon discover that the entire terra has been enslaved by two producers looking for the next big thing, and the Storm Hawks are their latest tryouts. One by one the Storm Hawks are rejected and captured, leaving only Stork, whose "doom" poetry impresses the producers. As the two producers chase down Stork, the Storm Hawks trick them into stranding themselves in the Wastelands. However, while Terra Neon is now free of the producers, the same can't be said for Ravess and her Talons.
21	"The Storm Hawks Seven"	Eric Hayden	December 3, 2007	121
Ravess is building a powerful sonic cannon at Polaris Point, an unstable terra in the center of a narrow passage between two quadrants of Atmos. When Starling finds out, she enlists the aid of the Storm Hawks to destroy it. Though they quickly devise a plan, Starling is somewhat disappointed when it comes to mission preparations, as the Storm Hawks "training" consists of little more than foolish games. When it comes time to attack, the Storm Hawks Seven (Aerrow includes Starling in the count) fails to destroy the cannon, which is protected by a shield. Using some clever disguises, Finn's awful guitar music, and some haphazard construction by Stork, the Storm Hawks are able to temporarily nullify Ravess' cannon while Piper and Starling disable the shield, allowing the Storm Hawks to destroy Polaris Point for good. With the threat over, the Storm Hawks surprise Starling with her own room on-board the Condor. Though she's not willing to join up yet, Starling gladly participates in another round of their unique form of training.
22	"Talon Academy"	Ken Pontac	December 4, 2007	122
After saving a Talon whose parachute failed, Piper discovers that the pilot is no older than herself. The Storm Hawks discover that the Cyclonians have created training camp. Glamorous advertising on the poster is meant to suggest that being a Talon is "cool", and kids flock to the camp to join. Aerrow, Radarr and Piper join the academy to take it down, using chroma crystals to change their appearance. The camp is led by "Sergeant" Snipe, who Aerrow can't help but continually annoy. During this time, Piper discovers that Cyclonia plans to use these new recruits to wipe out a defenseless terra, while Aerrow convinces them that being a Talon isn't all it's cracked up to be. Upon being discovered, Aerrow and Piper instigate a rebellion. A still-loyal student calls for a team of elite Talons during the commotion, and Aerrow directs the students in a massive aerial battle, which is meant to stall for time until Junko, Finn and Stork arrive. Seeing the bravery of their liberators, the students now want to become Storm Hawks instead.
23	"Siren's Song"	Paul Giacoppo	December 5, 2007	123
The Storm Hawks finds themselves stranded in the Great Expanse, a vast area devoid of life where instruments don't function and navigation is impossible. In recounting how they came to be in their situations, the Storm Hawks discover that they are being preyed upon by a Sky Siren, an illusion-casting witch intent on destroying them. She attempts to use their greatest desires against them, keeping them from escaping. One by one the Storm Hawks fall prey to her powers, but in the end it is Radarr who overcomes her and pilots the ship to safety, the act of doing so having been his greatest desire, driving the condor.
24	"Calling All Domos"	Eugene Son	December 6, 2007	124
While Aerrow, Piper, and Radaar take Junko to the dentist, Finn and Stork are left to their own devices. A bird from Terra Vapos delivers a note to Finn, requesting his assistance, and the two set out to help. When they arrive, King Agar asks them to retrieve a crystal which maintains their very existence. Finn and Stork find that the Murk Raiders have stolen the crystal, so they sneak aboard their ship and steal it back, only to have the Murk Raiders follow them back to Vapos. The pair manage to hold off the Murk Raiders long enough to restore the terra, and Agar pays the Murk Raiders for their trouble with a fortune of gold. However, to the Murk Raiders dismay, the gold turns to dust as soon as they leave the terra, since, as Agar explains, "nothing ever truly leaves Vapos."
25	"The Lesson"	Eric Hayden	December 7, 2007	125
Arygyn, a famous trainer of warriors, sneaks onto the Condor under the guise of a bird. Once on the ship, he proceeds to defeat each member of the Storm Hawks, before revealing that he's there to train them. The Cyclonians have received enhancement crystals, and are, alone, more powerful than any single squadron. In an attempt to train the Storm Hawks, Arygyn reserves Terra Neon for the whole day and uses games as training tools. Junko is given an out of control bumper-car ride to learn dexterity. Piper is given an enhanced "Test Your Strength" game to improve her physical abilities. Stork is put on an out of control Mechanical Bull to improve his balance. Finn is given a hyper-charged shooting gallery. Finally, Aerrow is told to board a fast-moving roller coaster. Once they win these games, they leave Arygyn, angry that they didn't learn anything of use. The skills they gained from the games, however, are quite useful against the super-charged Cyclonians, allowing them to achieve victory.
26	"Dude, Where's My Condor?"	Scott Sonneborn	December 10, 2007	126
The Condor goes in for repairs but Finn instead trades it for a "better" model. They quickly discover their new vessel is a lemon, and when they attempt to return it they discover that the Condor has been sold to the Colonel. The Colonel wants to use the Condor to break the airspeed record, and refuses to relinquish it. A race against the Condor meant to win it back predictably ends in failure; it is the fastest ship in Atmos. When the Colonel attempts to try for the airspeed record, the Condor begins to break apart at the seams, its hull unable to take the strain. The Colonel abandons ship, giving the Storm Hawks the chance to stop the ship. When the ship finally stops, it turns out the Condor broke the airspeed record.

=== Season 2 (2008–09) ===
No. overall	No. in season	Title	Written by	Original release date	Prod. code
27	1	"The Masked Masher"	Alexx Van Dyne	September 6, 2008	201
Finn trades ten power crystals for six tickets to go see the "Ultimate Extreme Mighty Mega Warrior Championships", which Piper discovers is held in Cyclonia. The Storm Hawks find out that the tickets were fake while presenting them to the guard. To get in to watch the show, Finn disguises Junko as one of the colorful competitors but things quickly get out of hand when Finn abuses a hypnosis crystal on Junko to make him fight, sending Junko into a berserker rage. Meanwhile, Piper sneaks around Master Cyclonis' office and gains valuable information but is eventually discovered. The Storm Hawks are forced to fight against the berserk Junko until Finn remembers (with help) the password to disable the hold the hypnosis crystal had over Junko. They escape shortly thereafter.
28	2	"Atmos' Most Wanted"	Eugene Son	September 13, 2008	202
A series of robberies is traced back to the Storm Hawks, and the team must evade capture while trying to figure out who framed them. The Storm Hawks find a pattern in the thefts and realize the shards of the Aurora Stone are the next target. The culprits are the Raptors, who have been using crude Storm Hawks' masks to impersonate the genuine articles. In a midair battle, the Storm Hawks recover the stolen items and clear their names.
29	3	"Stratosphere"	Paul Giacoppo	September 20, 2008	203
Ravess is commanding a battle station in previously unreachable stratosphere, from which a satellite weapon, the Exopod, will be launched into the exosphere. The Condor is modified to reach the stratosphere, and after defeating Ravess the Storm Hawks modify Aerrow's skimmer for space travel. Aerrow and Radarr are launched into the exosphere after the Exopod, but a miscalculation with the trajectory forces Aerrow to send Radarr off alone to deal with the Exopod while he orbits the planet to reach Radarr once again. Radarr manages to knock the Exopod out of orbit, destroying Ravess' carrier in the process as she tries to fire on the Condor. Aerrow manages to make has way back and recover Radarr, and they are safely recovered by the team after reentry.
30	4	"The Last Stand"	Eric Hayden	September 27, 2008	204
The Storm Hawks crash land in the Wastelands after rescuing a group of Wallops from a mine. Unfortunately, Mr. Moss, the warden of Terra Zartacla, is back with an army of fire scorpions. The Storm Hawks hold off his siege with the help of the Wallop Miners, who take breaks at inopportune times and act rudely to Junko, who idolizes them. When Junko eventually gets frustrated with them, they finally start helping out in earnest, buying Piper and Radarr enough time to cool off the engine crystals and take off.
31	5	"Life with Lugey"	Scott Sonneborn	October 4, 2008	205
When Stork swallows a powerful Gravitron Crystal, Lugey becomes stuck to him. To keep Lugey from running back to Repton with Stork still attached, the Storm Hawks use various ploys to distract him. Piper figures that if Stork and Lugey do not separate soon, they will be stuck together forever. To create the crystal needed to separate them, the Storm Hawks break into the lab of the giant Gundstaff. The Raptors show up and fight with the Storm Hawks, and in the confusion Stork coughs up the Gravitron crystal when one of the Raptors bumps into him. The Storm Hawks escape, while Repton and the Raptors (now stuck together thanks to the crystal) are left to deal with an angry Gundstaff.
32	6	"What Got Into Finn?"	Ken Pontac	October 11, 2008	206
The Storm Hawks are anonymously hired by Master Cyclonis to deliver a canister to an uncharted location, and are specifically told not to open it. Predictably, Finn and Junko open the canister, and are infected by Aggrospores. Finn becomes a monster, while Junko, being a Wallop, becomes extremely sleepy. Finn (in monster form) escapes the Condor to Terra Atmosia, where he causes mass destruction and chaos. Stork, after finding an antidote, attempts to capture Monster Finn in a series of Wile E. Coyote-esque schemes, all of which end in failure. Stork goes insane and builds a massive robot dinosaur ('Storkasaurus'), which causes even more damage before Aerrow stops him. Aerrow finally cures Finn by hiding the cure in food, but unfortunately for Finn, he is now infested with fleas.
33	7	"Royal Twist"	Alexx Van Dyne	October 18, 2008	207
On a scouting mission, Piper discovers the unknown Terra Klockstoppia and meets Princess Peregrine, a woman who could pass for her twin. She longs for adventure beyond the walls of the castle, but her life is dictated by the Regent, who is the acting ruler of the terra. The two are amazed at each other's lives, but for different reasons-Piper respects Perry for being a princess and is amazed at the lack of modern crystal technology, while Perry envies Piper's "action-packed" life of a Storm Hawk. In a parody of The Prince and the Pauper, Perry knocks Piper out and takes her place. Piper tries to explain what happened to the Regent, but her explanations are dismissed as wild tales of fantasy. Perry soon finds out that Piper's life is not as adventurous as she originally thought, as Piper has many responsibilities, and her lack of knowledge about Piper's duties nearly leads to disaster. Meanwhile, a group of Nightcrawlers, on a mission from Master Cyclonis, attempt to steal the stores of crystals located on Terra Klockstoppia. Piper tries to fight them off, but with the best weapons available on Klockstoppia being cannons that fire oranges, she is subdued quickly. Perry returns with the Storm Hawks, having revealed her true identity to them earlier. As the Storm Hawks exhausted most of their crystal power to make the trip, the Night Crawlers have the advantage. Piper and Perry exploit the Night Crawlers' aversion to sunlight with Solaris crystals, driving them off. After the battle is over, Perry decides to take over the kingdom, as it is her birthright.
34	8	"Second Chances"	Eugene Son	November 1, 2008	208
Carver is released from prison, exonerated of his crimes after evidence suggests a mind control crystal was used on him. He joins the Storm Hawks, and with him comes the media, making the Storm Hawks more famous than ever. He dresses the team in new uniforms and helps out with dangerous missions. However, his good name seems to come at Aerrow's expense, as Aerrow is plagued by mysterious malfunctions in his weapons and vehicle. Carver convinces the Storm Hawks that Aerrow is being controlled by Cyclonis, and must be imprisoned for his own good. Aerrow is thrown in jail so the "mind control" can wear off. Carver steals Stork's new pet (the deadliest in the Atmos, where one touch equals death) and puts it in Aerrow's cell while he is sleeping. Meanwhile, Piper finds out that Aerrow is not really under a spell, and Carver is really out to get him. Aerrow escapes from prison with Radarr's help, revealing that Stork's "super-deadly spider" is actually a tickle-spider. He tricks Carver into confessing his guilt before his own media entourage, and Carver is sent back to prison. The Storm Hawks rid themselves of the media circus but keep the new uniforms as fancy dress outfits and revert to their old uniform.
35	9	"Radarr Love"	Scott Sonneborn	November 8, 2008	209
Radarr is accidentally left behind at a pit stop. By the time his team realizes it, Radarr has stranded himself on a Cyclonian cruiser while outrunning a pack of chickens. The commander of the ship (who cannot decide on his own name) plans to deploy floating mines disguised as weather balloons. Radarr contacts the Storm Hawks using the ship's radio; though he cannot speak in an understandable fashion, Aerrow recognizes his voice immediately. Following the signal, Stork accidentally crashes the Condor into the battle cruiser, knocking out everyone on their ship. When the Storm Hawks wake up, they find themselves in the ship's brig. Radarr releases them while trying to get their attention. The Storm Hawks and Radarr separately make their way to the cargo bay, from which the balloons are being deployed, and disable them without noticing one another. Radarr is brought back to the Condor by the chickens, where his teammates, unable to understand him or his explanation, make fun of him for missing all the action.
36	10	"Scout's Honour"	Alexx Van Dyne	November 15, 2008	210
Stork has to take three Sky Scouts to Terra Fauna for camping. Things go awry, however, when they unintentionally land on Terra Gruesomus, and find themselves face-to-face with bog howlers controlled by Snipe using mind-control helmets. The Storm Hawks come to help when they find out that Snipe has attacked Stork and his companions. Stork and the Sky Scouts manage to disable the helmets, and convince the bog howlers to attack the Talons. Stork bids farewell to the Sky Scouts, but notes that he signed up to take them camping again next month.
37	11	"Sky's End"	Ken Pontac	November 22, 2008	211
A fierce storm blows the Condor to the very edge of recorded territories of the Atmos, called "Sky's End". There they are attacked by a dragon, which turns out to be a disguised ship. The pilot is a man named Rinjiin, the last of the dragon knights. He was piloting the dragon ship in order to protect a sanctuary for baby dragons. Hundreds of years ago, before established air travel, there were thousands of dragons. When various peoples took to the sky, they saw the dragons as a threat, and hunted them to near extinction. They became a legend, until Rinjiin found a clutch of dragon eggs. He considers it his duty to protect them and raise them to adulthood. Unfortunately, the Storm Hawks have now disabled his means to protect them, and the Murk Raiders plan to capitalize on the opportunity. The Storm Hawks manage to repair to the dragon ship in time to fight the Murk Raiders, but are ultimately outgunned. Fortunately, Radarr is able to rally the baby dragons to assist, driving the Murk Raiders away. In the end, the Storm Hawks convince all the Sky Knights of Atmos to help protect the dragons (although they will all be working in shifts, as Stork points out that dragons take sixty years to grow up).
38	12	"Five Days"	Eric Hayden	November 29, 2008	212
Piper steals a powerful repair crystal, capable of fixing anything, from Gundstaff's hut. She needs it to repair Aerrow, who broke nearly every bone in his body when he slipped on oil and fell into the Condor's engine. Unfortunately, even with the crystal aiding his recovery, he still has to remain motionless for five days. While the other Storm Hawks make him comfortable, Snipe breaks one of Master Cyclonis' crystals. Needing the repair crystal to fix it, the trail quickly leads to the Storm Hawks. The Night Crawlers, recently upgraded by Master Cyclonis, attack the Condor. Master Cyclonis uses the confusion to sneak aboard, defeating the Storm Hawks one by one as she makes a beeline to the crystal. Aerrow, now fully recovered, defeats her, but she escapes with the repair crystal. Cyclonis uses the crystal to fix her broken one, which generates a hologram of herself as a young girl standing with her grandmother, the previous Master Cyclonis.
39	13	"Energy Crisis"	Eugene Son	December 6, 2008	213
While shopping on Terra Saharr, Piper spots the Dark Ace, who is looking for a crystal expert. Piper alerts the boys and they set a trap, hiding the expert while Piper disguises herself as him. The Dark Ace shows Piper the Medulla Crystal and asks her if it is real, which it is. The Storm Hawks reveal themselves but the Dark Ace manages to escape. The Medulla Crystal serves as a second brain for the Suit of Untold Vengeance, which one person cannot control alone. However, the unstable crystal will also drive the wearer insane. Unable to defeat the Dark Ace while he is wearing the suit, Aerrow tricks him into exhausting the suit's power, allowing them to destroy it. Afterward, they melt down the parts of the Suit of Untold Vengeance, and destroy the Medulla Crystal, so the suit can never be used again.
40	14	"Dark Waters"	Scott Sonneborn	March 19, 2009	214
The Storm Hawks respond to a distress call from the bottom of Terra Aquanos to rescue the Neck Deeps. At the bottom, they find monsters which have been released by I.J. Domiwick from a sealed cavern. In this cavern are supposedly endless tunnels that lead to everywhere throughout the Atmos, even the fabled "other side". The Storm Hawks and the Neck Deeps reseal the cavern, but not before Domiwick escapes and swims through it. Just as the Storm Hawks head for the surface, a single monster left behind punctures the Condor, causing it to flood. All but Aerrow abandon ship, Aerrow having given his breather to Piper after Domiwick stole hers. Aerrow manages to make it to the surface while riding atop the monster, now called "Bessie", to satisfy Stork's belief that the previously made-up exists. In the last scene, Domiwick is seen crawling up onto shore on an unknown land.
41	15	"Number One Fan"	Marty Isenberg	March 20, 2009	215
With nothing better to do, the Storm Hawks answer a distress call from a very small, almost unnoticeable terra, where they meet a nerdy boy named Noob. Noob is their number one fan and president of the Storm Hawks fan club. Noob manages to talk his way onto the Condor, quickly becoming an annoyance to the Storm Hawks. Noob wants to see them fight Cyclonians but the Cyclonians haven't been active for weeks, which Aerrow finds suspicious. Cyclonis is planning something that requires many rare warp crystals, that she sends her Talons to collect. While playing on Finn's Skimmer, Noob nearly falls into the Wastelands. The Storm hawks decide it is time for him to leave, but he refuses to, believing that they are testing him. Finn finally snaps and hurts his feelings, which convinces Noob to leave. Noob soon sends another distress signal, but the Storm Hawks don't believe him, even though Ravess is actually attacking the crystal mines on his terra. Ravess captures Noob and interrogates him. The Storm Hawks, feeling bad, head back to his terra. Meanwhile, Ravess accidentally reveals Cyclonis' secret plot. The Storm Hawks arrive and rescue Noob, who possesses three warp crystals. Noob drives his trailer into Ravess and the warp crystals activate, sending her to Master Cyclonis. Noob then tells them about Operation Exodus, Cyclonis' secret mission. Noob realizes that he shouldn't obsess with the Storm Hawks and whips out a trailer dedicated to the Absolute Zeros.
42	16	"A Colonel of Truth"	Charlotte Fullerton	March 23, 2009	216
The Colonel has lost his favorite pet, "Mr. Fluffykins", who ends up on the Condor and causes havoc. The Colonel tracks Fluffykins to the Condor, and out of gratitude for "rescuing" his pet gives them his services for the day, as part of a gangster code. The Storm Hawks take advantage of this to keep him so busy that he won't be able to do his regular crimes. His jobs include working in a soup kitchen, picking up trash, exterminating bugs, giving away some of his money, and releasing prisoners from Cyclonian prison. Seeing Fluffykins' distress, Stork believes that the animal really ran away, and the Colonel soon realizes that they never rescued Fluffykins. The Colonel tries to unleash Fluffykins on Piper, Stork and Junko, but Fluffykins stops when he sees a flock of his own kind. They realize that he just wants to be free. Fluffykins tries to fly but his restraining collar prevents him from doing so, causing him to fall into a pit filled with lava. The Colonel reluctantly frees the Storm Hawks so they can save Fluffykins. The Colonel states he is again in their debt, and Piper wants him to release Fluffykins. The Colonel sadly releases him and says goodbye to his beloved pet.
43	17	"Shipwrecked"	Ken Pontac	March 24, 2009	217
After a futile search for Operation Exodus, the Storm Hawks decide to take a vacation on Terra Tropica. However, a tsunami separates Aerrow, Finn, Junko, Piper and Radarr from Stork and the Condor, who is ambushed by some natives. Aerrow heads to find Stork with Radarr while the others search for food and make shelter. Stork manages to scare off the natives with an amateur magic trick and makes his way to the Condor but is confronted by the same natives, only angrier. They chase him throughout the jungle. Stork flees into an ancient temple which the natives won't enter. While inside, Stork finds a strange door guarded by a giant crystal golem. Stork runs out of the cave followed by the now frightened natives and the angry golem. Stork makes it to the Condor but finds it guarded by natives. He uses one of their masks to impersonate them to get by. He flies the Condor to his friends and picks them up before a second tidal wave hits. Stork tells them of the natives, the golem, and the strange door but they don't believe him. In the final scene, Cyclonians are seen heading to the same temple.
44	18	"Power Grab"	Steve Ball	March 25, 2009	218
Master Cyclonis leaves on a secret mission to retrieve the doorway Stork found in the previous episode and puts Ravess in charge in her absence. Whilst there, Cyclonis meets some new and loyal henchmen: Night Crawlers. Ravess abuses her power at Snipe's expense, so Snipe stages a mutiny with the help of the commander from "Radarr Love" and takes control of Cyclonia. More concerned with his own amusement than running Cyclonia, Snipe ignores the commander that helped him and carelessly orders the Talons to shoot down anyone that approaches, which happens to be Repton and the Raptors. Angered by Snipe's actions, Repton successfully overthrows Snipe, helped by the commander Snipe snubbed. Now in charge, Repton prepares the fleet for an attack. The rest of the Raptors decide to overthrow Repton because of how he treats them and end up driving their ship into Cyclonia. In his attempt to punish them, Repton accidentally locks himself and the Raptors in a cell with Snipe and Ravess. Lugey, however, is left outside and takes charge, just as Master Cyclonis returns. Still needing their services, Cyclonis forgoes punishing the Raptors or Snipe, but has Ravess banished for her incompetence.
45	19	"Home Movie Night"	Rob Hoegee	March 26, 2009	219
A clip show episode, the Storm Hawks have a night to watch movies on their adventures. Each of the Storm Hawks get a chance to show a video about them. Finn makes a movie about himself, Piper makes two videos (one about crystals and another about places in the Atmos, which the end is taped over by Finn dancing), Junko shows a movie about each of their Skimmers, Stork shows his top ten fears (things to avoid in the Atmos), and Aerrow shows what it's like to be a Sky Knight. Everyone bails at the last minute when Junko suggests to watch his experimental film where he sleeps for hours. Note: This episode was originally an extra on a season one DVD
46	20	"Origins"	Rob Hoegee	March 27, 2009	220
This episode serves as a prequel to the series. Aerrow, Finn, Piper and Radarr are orphans living in a fortress on a small terra, which is threatened by a Cyclonian Youth Squad, which Junko is a part of. Three men approach Aerrow and give him a key and map to the Condor, stating that he is the last descendant of Lightning Strike, leader of the Storm Hawks, and thus inherits leadership. However, because of them Aerrow and his friends are captured. The leader of the Youth Squad radios Snipe and is told to throw them into the Wastelands. Junko volunteers to do it, but lets them go when the others are not looking, as he does not want to be a bad guy. They manage to find the Condor in the Wastelands, and it has already been repaired by Stork, who has lived there for years trying to find the key. In possession of items they both desire, the two sides team up. Stork takes them to the hangar bay, where they find all of the Skimmers and weapons used by the original Storm Hawks. The Storm Hawks head back to their terra to reclaim it and battle the Youth Squad. Junko switches sides upon seeing the Condor. Snipe arrives and gives a leech crystal for the leader to attach to the Condor. Aerrow manages to get it off just before the Condor plunges into the Wastelands. After regaining their home, Aerrow feels as though it can no longer be their home knowing what they now know about the Storm Hawks. Piper then states that the Storm Hawks were special because they didn't have a home terra; they protected everyone. The same three men appear again and contemplate on their future stating that the boy will be a Sky Knight, and whether the "girl" is the "one"; only time will tell. On Cyclonia, Master Cyclonis is seen moving her grandmother's throne to which she states to the Dark Ace that times are changing and the Dark Ace replies stating he still remains her humble servant, and we then see Cyclonis working on her Storm Engine.
47	21	"The Ultra Dudes"	Scott Sonneborn	March 30, 2009	221
While the Storm Hawks return to Tropica to investigate the temple Stork found there, Finn and Radarr are sent off on a solo mission for cooking crystals so Finn doesn't compromise their stealth mission. Finn lands on a Western-style terra and enters a salon, where he angers a four-armed bandit and is challenged to a draw. Finn defeats the bandit, earning the respect of the townspeople. The bandit swears revenge on Finn. Elsewhere, the Storm Hawks reach the temple, only to find Ravess there instead of the doorway or the monster. Disgruntled by her banishment, she tells them that the door leads to the far side of Atmos, but without the key Cyclonis cannot open it. Back on the western terra, Finn's ego gets the better of him and he makes his own squad called the Ultra Dudes, teaching them useless tricks. When the bandit returns with his Murk Raider allies, Finn confesses that everything he taught them was useless. The Ultra Dudes, however, still have faith and want to defend their home. Finn comes to their rescue after some guilt tripping from Radarr. The Ultra Dudes manage to defeat the Murk Raiders with the help of the townspeople. Finn challenges Captain Scabulous to a draw, which Scabulous cheats at, and wins when the townspeople step in. Finn returns to the Condor and is glad that he is not the leader of the Storm Hawks, seeing as there is so much work to it.
48	22	"A Wallop For All Seasons"	Eugene Son	March 31, 2009	222
Junko has been summoned back to his home on Terra Wallop and Aerrow insists that they accompany him. They head to see the chief who tells him he is taking over the family business: underwear retail. Junko cannot refuse as it will bring shame to his family. Piper and Aerrow head to find Junko's Uncle Dilly, the previous owner, and discover Cyclonians. The chief reveals that he invited the Cyclonians as a part of a treaty, as he expects them to win the war and wants to be on the winning side. Junko challenges the chief to a battle after failing to convince him that the Cyclonians are evil. During the match, Junko tries to reason with the chief, but the chief won't listen. Junko realizes the chief won't fight the Cyclonians because he is afraid to stand up to them, and manages to subdue the chief by tricking him into knocking trees onto himself. Junko refuses to deliver the finishing below that would solidify his position as the new chief. As the Storm Hawks depart, Junko states that strength means nothing unless they have the courage to use it for good. Other Wallops contemplate on Junko's words of courage and decide that just because their chief supports Cyclonia, they do not have to. Junko's words have inspired them to create the Wallop Resistance.
49	23	"Payback"	Scott Sonneborn	April 1, 2009	223
The Raptors destroy the Condor, and a Cyclonian attack on the Storm Hawks scatters the team. Piper lands on Gundstaff's terra, who decides to help her after revealing that the Cyclonians have also taken his family. Finn lands on a Blizzarian's garbage truck. Junko fights off Cyclonians with the help of some wrestlers. Aerrow is told by the three guardians from "Origins" and Arygyn that the future of Atmos doesn't include him, but Arygyn assures him that he will do fine. Finally, Stork follows Repton to Terra Bogaton and single-handedly liberates it during his anger/revenge fit on Repton for destroying the Condor. Grateful for his actions, the Bogaton scientists decide to rebuild the Condor. Snipe is banished by Master Cyclonis for failing to destroy Aerrow.
50	24	"The Key"	Alexx Van Dyne	April 2, 2009	224
While reconstruction of the Condor gets underway with countless volunteers, Aerrow and Piper check out a report of Cyclonian activity in the Forbidden City. There they find Master Cyclonis and the Dark Ace summoning the spirit of the Oracle, in order to divine the location of the Oracle Stone, which is the key to Master Cyclonis' far side door. Said stone was given to Piper as a gift by Aerrow, and remains in her possession. When Cyclonis threatens to destroy the Oracle spirit, Aerrow jumps in and gives her time to escape. During the battle, Dark Ace battles with Aerrow and with Cyclonis's power, she makes Dark Ace strong enough to knock Aerrow unconscious, and doesn't get up in time and Dark Ace was about to knock Aerrow out. Piper touches the key she gives Aerrow power, like super strength, which Master Cyclonis is also capable of. However, the Dark Ace and Cyclonis escape. Aerrow and Piper head back to Bogaton where the workers have completed the Condor. Piper worries about her new skill, saying that it feels dark, as does the Dark Ace, who fears that Piper may become as powerful as Cyclonis herself. Cyclonis remains unconcerned, convinced that Piper will destroy herself before she can master the power. In the final scene, Cyclonis opens the door to the far side and walks in.
51	25	"Cyclonia Rising Part 1"	David Slack	April 3, 2009	225
Using her far side door, Master Cyclonis arms her Night Crawlers with crystal technology from the far side, making them far superior to any force in Atmos but Aerow's special new power. Aerrow leads a united Atmos straight into Cyclonia for the battle to end all battles. Piper learns from Cyclonis that her new power, known as the "Binding", is evil and will turn her evil if she masters it. Piper insists on developing the power anyway, despite Aerrow's misgivings. Aerrow's united force manages to defeat the first wave of regular Cyclonians, but is vastly outgunned when Cyclonis releases a second wave of Night Crawlers. Furthermore, she has equipped her terra with levitation pontoons, turning it into a flying fortress of destruction.
52	26	"Cyclonia Rising Part 2"	David Slack	April 6, 2009	226
In only 6 weeks, Cyclonis has conquered all of Atmos. Every Sky Knight is trapped in a crystal prison and their vehicles scrapped. Only the Storm Hawks remain, playing childish pranks on Cyclonis. Piper is in bad shape, the Binding slowly weakening her despite not using it. Cyclonis, tired of their resistance, threatens to destroy Terra Atmosia, and the Storm Hawks surrender to prevent it. This turns out to be a ploy to reach the crystal prison, which Aerrow shatters with help from Piper. The freed Sky Knights attempt to shoot down Cyclonia with stolen Skimmers, but cannot penetrate the shielding on the levitation pontoons. Stork and Finn, however, discover that the crystal technology the Night Crawlers wear is allergic to Radarr's fur. Meanwhile, Aerrow and Piper face Cyclonis and the Dark Ace. Already quite weak, Piper's ability to empower Aerrow ultimately gives out. However, when Aerrow insists they will die together "If we gotta go down at least we're going down together" and with that the Binding flows from him and into her, restoring her health and empowering them both. Unable to defeat them with her ordinary skills, Cyclonis draws power from her far side crystal to empower the Dark Ace, but gets carried away and destroys him from a power overload. The resulting energy release destroys the far side crystal, allowing Finn and Junko to disable the pontoons and destroys Cyclonia. Cyclonis escapes through the door to the other side while the Storm Hawks follow. The end scene is narrated by Starling, who relates that it has been six hours since their victory and six hours since they have seen the greatest heroes of Atmos. They raise up a flag of the Storm Hawks, the bravest heroes Atmos has ever known. Meanwhile, the Storm Hawks make it to the other side filled with new creatures and places.
