= Actors for Refugees =

Australian community organisation

Actors for Refugees is an Australian community organisation. It was founded in Melbourne in September 2001 by actresses Alice Garner and Kate Atkinson. It aimed to use the collective power of Australian actors to influence community attitudes toward refugees and asylum seekers and to encourage a humanitarian response to their plight.

The network's main activity was performing 'Something to Declare' compiled by Michael Gurr, and Club Refuge; rehearsed readings of true stories and first-hand testimonies of asylum seekers and refugees in Australia. The Australian network ceased to operate in early 2008.

== UK network – history ==
In 2006, one of the core members of the Australian network, Christine Bacon, joined with theatre company iceandfire to develop an Actors for Refugees network and production in the UK. The UK production, called Asylum Monologues, was launched along with Actors for Refugees UK, on 25 June 2006 at Amnesty International, London. It has been touring the UK ever since and has reached many thousands of people.

== Actors for Human Rights ==
In 2008, Actors for Refugees UK became Actors for Human Rights and now aims to draw public attention to a range of human rights concerns. it has become the major outreach project of iceandfire theatre company. Productions to be launched in 2008 include 'Rendition Monologues', 'Asylum Dialogues', Palestine Monologues' and 'The Illegals'.
