= Love and Other Catastrophes =

- Theatrical release poster
- Directed by: Emma-Kate Croghan
- Screenplay by: Yael Bergman; Emma-Kate Croghan; Helen Bandis
- Story by: Stavros Kazantzidis
- Produced by: Helen Bandis; Stavros Kazantzidis; Yael Bergman
- Starring: Frances O'Connor; Alice Garner; Matthew Dyktynski; Matt Day; Radha Mitchell
- Cinematography: Justin Brickle
- Edited by: Ken Sallows
- Music by: Oleh Witer
- Distributed by: Newvision Film Distributors
- Release date: 1 August 1996
- Running time: 79 minutes
- Country: Australia
- Language: English
- Budget: $250,000 (est.)
- Box office: $431,000 (US thru April 1997)

Love and Other Catastrophes is a 1996 Australian romantic comedy film featuring Frances O'Connor, Radha Mitchell, Alice Garner, Matthew Dyktynski, Matt Day and Kym Gyngell. The film was the first full-length release by director Emma-Kate Croghan and is set and filmed at Melbourne University where she studied writing and film directing.

The film was nominated for five Australian Film Institute awards, including best film, best original screenplay, best actress, best supporting actress, and editing. Garner won a Film Critics Circle of Australia award for best supporting actress for her role in the movie. At the ARIA Music Awards of 1997 the soundtrack was nominated for Best Original Soundtrack, Cast or Show Album.

In 2024, the film was restored and reissued on Blu-ray by Umbrella Entertainment.

== Plot ==
The story revolves around University of Melbourne film studies students and roommates Mia and Alice, each of whom is experiencing various upheavals. Mia and Alice have just moved into a trendy apartment but are in desperate need of a housemate. Mia's girlfriend Danni is keen to move in, but Mia fears commitment.

Obsessed with her favourite lecturer, Mia becomes embroiled in a war of paperwork with the university administration as she attempts to pursue him to his new department. She is hampered in her efforts to transfer by her current supervisor Professor Leach. To add to her woes she then breaks up with her girlfriend, Danni. Danni pursues another love interest, in part to get back at Mia.

Alice, a habitual perfectionist, is four years late with her thesis on 'Doris Day as Feminist Warrior. She is looking for the perfect man, but can't find anyone who fits her strict criteria. Frustrated, she falls for the most unsuitable male possible: Ari, a classics student and part-time gigolo. However, she is the object of desire of shy medical student, Michael.

As the day ends and the party begins events begin to unscramble in unexpected ways. Omnia Vincit Amor... Love Conquers All.

== Cast ==
- Matt Day as Michael Douglas
- Matthew Dyktynski as Ari
- Alice Garner as Alice
- Frances O'Connor as Mia
- Radha Mitchell as Danni
- Suzi Dougherty as Savita
- Kim Gyngell as Professor Richard Leach
- Suzanne Dowling as Dr. Russell
- Torquil Neilson as Toby
- Christine Stephen-Daly as Susan
- Dominic McDonald as Zac
- Alvin Chong as Alvin
- Myles Collins as Myles
- Antony Neate as Tony
- Brigid Kelly as Brigid
- Adrian Martin as himself

== Music ==
Love and Other Catastrophes features music by many bands including:

- Daryl McKenzie – "Manhattan Walk"
- Velvet Underground – "Sunday Morning"
- The Cruel Sea – "Just a Man"
- Dave Graney & The Coral Snakes – "You're Just Too Hip Baby"
- Underground Lovers – "Recognize"
- Godstar – "Pushpin"
- Rebecca's Empire – "Empty"
- Tumbleweed – "TV Genocide"
- Spdfgh – "Steal Mine"
- Tex, Don and Charlie – "Fake That Emotion"
- Monday Michiru – "Rainy Daze"
- The Boners – "Perils of Mia"
- The Cardigans – "Carnival"
- Bellydance – "Bubbles (Pigs Will Fly)"
- Blue Mink – "Can You Feel It Baby"
- Simon Holmes and Morgana Ancone – "Let's Do It (Let's Fall in Love)"
- Died Pretty – "Good at Love"

== Box office ==
Love and Other Catastrophes grossed $1,687,929 at the box office in Australia.

== See also ==
- Cinema of Australia
