= Max Steel (2013 TV series) =

2013 animated series

- Genre: Superhero; Action-adventure; Science fiction
- Based on: Max Steel by Mattel
- Developed by: Lloyd Goldfine; Gabriel De La Torre
- Written by: Matthew Drdek; Lloyd Goldfine
- Voices of: Andrew Francis; Sam Vincent; Michael Dobson; Nicole Oliver; Sarah Edmondson; Richard Ian Cox; Omari Newton; Kathleen Barr; Mark Oliver; Brian Dobson; Brian Drummond; Giles Panton
- Theme music composer: Michael Tavera (season 1); Shawn Patterson (season 2)
- Composers: Michael Tavera (season 1); Steven Argila (season 2)
- Countries of origin: Canada; United Kingdom; United States
- Original language: English
- No. of seasons: 2
- No. of episodes: 52 (+ 7 movies) (list of episodes)

Production
- Executive producers: Lloyd Goldfine; Audu Paden; Dave Voss; Bob Higgins; Sander Schwartz; Ken Faier; Asaph Fipke; Chuck Johnson
- Producers: Tina Chow; Vincent Edwards (season 1); Ira Singerman (season 1); Margaret M. Dean (season 2)
- Running time: 22–66 minutes
- Production companies: Nerd Corps Entertainment; FremantleMedia Enterprises; Mattel Studios (season 1); Mattel Playground Productions (season 2)

Original release
- Network: Disney XD (season 1); Netflix (season 2)
- Release: March 25, 2013 – December 6, 2014
- Release: June 27, 2015 – July 29, 2017

Related
- Max Steel (2000); Max Steel (2016)

Max Steel is an animated science fiction action-adventure superhero television series co-produced by Mattel Playground Productions, Nerd Corps Entertainment and FremantleMedia Enterprises. It is a reimagining of its predecessor of the same name, as well as being based on the Mattel action-figure also of the same name. Max Steel premiered on March 25, 2013, on Disney XD.

== Plot ==
=== Season 1 (2013) ===
Sixteen year old Maxwell McGrath's life changes dramatically when he and his mom move to a small town called Copper Canyon. As he adjusts to his new home. Max begins generating a powerful blue energy called "T.U.R.B.O. Energy" and joins N-Tek, a top-secret organization once associated with his father. At N-Tek, Max meets Steel, an "ultralink" named N'Barro Aksteel X377. When super villains attack Copper Canyon, Max and Steel must link together and transform into a powerful superhero named "Max Steel."

=== Season 2 (2014) ===
After learning from Forge that Jim was the former Max Steel, Max faces new challenges and powerful enemies, like Toxzon and Extroyer, gets new turbo modes, and confronts a bigger threat to Earth. As the Makino Invasion approaches, Max must uncover the truth about his past that Forge continues to keep hidden. Meanwhile, Sidney and Kirby grow closer to discovering the true identity of Max Steel.

=== Animated films (2015–17) ===
The Wrath of Makino, Dawn of Morphos, Maximum Morphos, Team Turbo, Team Turbo Fusion Tek, Turbo Charged and Turbo Warriors

Makino has been defeated, but his core processing unit remains and is looking for a new host. Max Steel must destroy Makino once and for all. After Makino, Max Steel will have to face Morphos, a new villain who can replicate the abilities of his enemies and use their own powers against them. Max Steel must learn to combine two turbo modes to defeat Morphos. When Morphos returns stronger and more powerful than ever, he copies the powers of all of Max Steel's enemies, in order to prove he is the greatest villain of all. Max Steel will have to team up with his enemies (Miles Dredd, Toxzon, Extroyer, and the Elementors (Fire Elementor, Earth Elementor, Water Elementor, Air Elementor, and Metal Elementor)) and unlock his greatest power to defeat Morphos once and for all.

Two years afterwards, a new villain named Mortum arises searching for the powerful Connect-Tek, a device who can create everything that someone thinks of. After successfully taking down N-Tek, the villain reunites Max's rogues (Toxzon, Extroyer and the five Elementors) to set out after the Connect-Tek. Realizing that they cannot save the day by their own, Max and Steel create Team Turbo - composed of Tempestra, C.Y.T.R.O. and La Fiera to fight back and rescue Max's loved ones. The Connect-Tek ends up on Mortum's hands, but it reveals to be damaged and causes a massive explosion that ends up turning him into a robot zombie. Possessing an endless hunger for brainwaves, he wants to take over the world and turn everyone into robot zombies and now Max and his team must face their biggest threat yet.

After Mortum is taken down and the world goes back to normal, a mysterious masked villain named Terrorax steals Max's energy and in the process makes him generate a much stronger, green variation that is so powerful to the point where Steel no longer is able to control it. After undergoing intense training and updating their tech, Max and his team are ready to go after Terrorax, who later on reveals to have synthesized his own version of Max's energy named Terror Energy - and he wants to take over by the name of the Nexus legion. However, after failing, his powers are greatly reduced and he needs the help from the Elementors, who join the legion. After getting his strength back, Terrorax invades Copper Canyon with Pantheon and wants to force people to join in the Nexus, and now Max and his team must stop him before it's too late, but things get fully compounded when La Fiera is turned into a bionic panther by Night Howl and Tempestra and C.Y.T.R.O. are captured by the legion. Now it's up to Max take down the Nexus before it's too late.

== Characters ==
=== Main ===
- Maxwell "Max" McGrath/Max Steel (voiced by Andrew Francis) is the titular protagonist of the series, a human-takion hybrid boy, Max is taken to the secret "N-Tek" facility, and discovers that his uncle, Forge Ferrus, is the commander and co-founder of N-Tek, along with Jim McGrath and Miles Dredd. Max later meets Steel, an Ultralink that will change Max's life and will later turn Max into the world's greatest and most powerful superhero in the world known as Max Steel. Maxwell and Steel don't know a lot about their past and also they don't know about N-Tek, especially N-Tek's true mission that Forge Ferrus is hiding from Max and Steel. Max has a friend named Kirby and has a crush on a girl named Sydney. Max wears a camouflage mode, so no one can see him with the Turbo Base Mode on (which can't be removed because it's permanently on Max) and he doesn't wants anyone to know that he is Max Steel. He is able to generate Tachyon Unlimited Radiant Bio-Optimized (TURBO) energy, and control it with the help of Steel, thereby creating the persona of Max Steel. As Max Steel, Max has superpowers (superhuman strength, speed, and durability) and a cadre of TURBO Modes for different combat scenarios including; Base, Strength, Camo (Max's civilian mode), Flight, Scuba, Super, Speed, Stealth, Cannon, Clone, Mimic (Steel's turbo mode), Heat, Rocket, Spike, Nova, Titan, Cannon Spike, Hydro Heat, Sonic Flight, Exo Strength, Hammer Claw, Prime, Hunter and Mega. Following the events of Turbo-Charged, Max obtains new, completely technological modes, being those: Armor, Jet Pack, Wave Rider, Sniper, Rocket Spear and Mountain Combat.
- N'Barro Aksteel X377/Steel (voiced by Sam Vincent) is an alien made only of technology, known as an Ultra-Link. He is only able to function by being charged from TURBO Energy, and along with Max acts as the armor persona Max Steel. Steel's memory core was damaged so many select memories of his time on Earth 16 years before the series are hazy, and battles with the Elementors insinuate that he had a connection to them. His full designation is "N'Barro Aksteel X377". Years ago he used to serve Makino, until meeting Jim McGrath. The two became the first Max Steel to fend off the first Makino Invasion.

=== Allies ===
- Commander Forge Ferrus (voiced by Michael Dobson) is an N-Tek commander, and a mentor to Max, his nephew. It seems that Forge and the rest of N-Tek are hiding a dark secret from Max Steel since "Thrill of the Hunt", when they tried to acquire a damaged Ultra-Link from an Alien Spaceship and gave no answers to Max about why he wanted it. He has a robotic left arm, having lost his real one in a battle. In "Makino Strikes: Part 1", Forge was ultralinked, and because of it his robotic arm now had three arms. But in "Makino Strikes: Part 2", Ven-Ghan managed to unlink him.
- Ja'em Mk'rah/James "Jim" McGrath (voiced by Trevor Devall) is Max's father who is one of the founders of N-Tek and later revealed to be an alien being from Planet Tachyon. Jim McGrath was the best in N-Tek, and also very smart and wise. He was Forge Ferrus' science officer and he was the one who discovered T.U.R.B.O Energy, a blue and powerful energy. He supposedly died when testing the Turbo Star, creating an explosion. Jim McGrath has a holographic monument of himself, and under it was the case that Steel was in since he was the alien Ultra-Link that was used in the experiment. In Earth Under Siege Part 2 it was discovered that Jim was the first person that Ultra-Linked with Steel before Max did. In The Legend of Ja'em Mk'rah Jim and Steel first met on Tachyon when the planet was invaded by Makino and his Ultralinks. It's revealed that Tachyons can also produce T.U.R.B.O. energy. In "The Final Countdown Part 2", Jim was revealed to be alive and held hostage by Makino, so he can use his TURBO energy to power-up the Alphalink.
- Molly McGrath (voiced by Nicole Oliver) is the secretive mother of Max. She is shown in the premiere as an amazing ninja spy when infiltrating THI and during the battle to raid some evidence that can expose their criminal empire. She becomes the new CEO of THI when Mr. Naught is removed following Dredd's first defeat by Max Steel. In the episode "The Secret Admirer", Toxzon turns her into a toxic monster with all his powers called Toxziana, until she is reverted to her original form.
- Sydney Gardner (voiced by Sarah Edmondson) is a know-how girl who meets Max and becomes his best friend. Max instantly develops a crush on her. In "The Truth Hurts", she finally learns Max's identity as Max Steel. However she lost her memory of this after a blast from Elementor. In "My Best Friend is an Ultralink", Sydney suffered the same fate as Forge did when she was ultralinked. But at the end of the episode Ven-Ghan managed to unlink her. In "The Dawn of Morphos", she learns Max's secret identity as Max Steel for the second time. This time she was told by Jim McGrath; she also knew for a long time, but she was just waiting for Max to tell her.
- Kirby Kowalski (voiced by Richard Ian Cox) is Max's best friend, who is loyal but incredibly gullible and laid back. In "My Best Friend is an Ultralink", Kirby suffered the same fate as Forge did when he was ultralinked. But at the end of the episode Ven-Ghan managed to unlink him.
- Roberto "Berto" Martinez (voiced by Sam Vincent) is a friend of Max and Steel. He is one of the most intelligent scientific geniuses at N-Tek. He notably invented C.Y.T.R.O. In "Split Decisions", it's revealed that Berto is keeping secrets from N-Tek.
  - C.Y.T.R.O. (voiced by Colin Murdock) is an N-Tek robot operative invented and controlled by Berto Martinez and is continuously being upgraded by him. His name stands for Cybernetic Tactical Robot Operative. During the events of Team Turbo, Berto upgrades with him with artificial intelligence. His Turbo Vehicle Modes are: Base, Chopper, Wrecking Ball and Drill.
- Jefferson Smith (voiced by Omari Newton) is a highly respected N-Tek agent. He, unlike any other pilot, owns his own Jump Jet which affectionately calls Lucille. It is hinted in the season 1 finale "Earth Under Siege" that he loves Kat.
- Katherine "Kat" Ryan (voiced by Kathleen Barr) is the highest ranking female N-Tek agent. She is proficient at xenobiology, as well as medicine, and is a skilled fighter in both hand-to-hand combat and long range.
- The Black Star Council have been around for an undetermined amount of time and are a group of aliens that have survived attacks from Makino's soldiers and have united to defend others from them and make them pay for their crimes.
  - Ven-Ghan (voiced by Giles Panton) is an Ultralink Hunter working for the Black Star Council. He has a personal vendetta against Makino and the Evil Ultralinks because they destroyed his planet. He is also after Steel and is not leaving without him. But in "The Ultralink Hunter", after seeing Steel risk his life to save him, he began to see Max Steel as an ally, and in the end of "Makino Strikes: Part 2", he decided to stop hunting Steel, after he saved his life again, and joined Max Steel and N-Tek in saving Earth from Makino.
- Team Turbo' are a team of superheroes formed by Maxwell, Steel, La Fiera, Tempestra and C.Y.T.R.O. who are Copper Canyon's protectors. They were formed in Team Turbo.
  - Alejandro Villar/La Fiera (voiced by Adrian Petriw) is an animal-themed superhero. He is a skillful soccer player and met Max in one of the matches, where he found a piece of Jim's Connect-Tek sword while the Daedelus platform was falling down. He uses the piece as a compass to see where it belongs and eventually meets Max, Steel, C.Y.T.R.O. and Rayne. His Turbo Animal Modes are: Base, Tiger, Eagle, Raptor and Wave Rider.
  - Rayne Martinez/Tempestra (voiced by Lili Beaudoin) is a weather-themed superheroine and Berto's younger sister. She was found by Max and Steel in the World 31 base while it was being invaded by Extroyer and his clones. Her Turbo Storm Modes are: Base, Lightning Storm, Ice Storm and Wave Rider.

=== Villains ===
- Miles Dredd (voiced by Mark Oliver) is the former owner of Trans Human Industries. Prior to the series, Miles was one of the co-founders of N-Tek, but he turned on the agency when he chose to steal TURBO Energy for his own gain, which resulted him to be fused by his siphon device into his chest. In order to live, he created a suit that connects to his siphon so he can consume TURBO Energy (much like a vampire) which will make him very powerful. He destroys N-Tek's defense grid of transmitters in order to make way for the Makino Ultralink Invasion and subjugate Earth. He later turned against Makino when he was deemed unworthy and escaped his forces.

- Jason Naught (voiced by Brian Dobson) is Dredd's right-hand man, and was also former CEO of Trans Human Industries. Dredd equipped him with an ability to transform into a giant robot to defeat his enemies like Max Steel. He has been shown to have his own ambitions other than Dredd's, and is often abused because of it. In "X Marks the Spot", he was almost killed by Dredd for betraying him a second time. He later sides with Makino alongside Dredd, but quickly turned against him when Makino deemed him and Dredd unworthy.
- Dreddnaughts are an army of robots that work for Miles Dredd. They don't talk, but they are very dangerous and they have a gun as a hand. In "Dredd Ascendant", when Naught showed Dredd their new underwater base it is revealed that they have upgraded Dreddnaughts.
- Axel (voiced by Michael Daingerfield) is a thug hired by Jason Naught as his henchman to do his dirty work.

- Makino (voiced by Michael Dobson) is an alien cybernetic being that has an Ultra-Link bonded to him, but it is permanent. He is the leader of the Ultra-Links and ruler of the planet Makino. In Season 1's "Earth Under Siege", Makino is allies with Miles Dredd, Ultimate Elementor, and Jason Naught. Makino wants to devour Earth and possibly convert it into his second home planet, but he must first destroy mankind and Max Steel with an Invasion of Ultra-Links, which takes place in Season 2.

- Evil Ultralinks are a special forces unit Makino has place under the command of Miles Dredd.

- Blast Link (voiced by Brian Drummond) is the sniper of the unit, ultra-linked with a THI plasma cannon giving him powerful distance weapons.
- Prism Link (voiced by Lee Tockar) is the close quarters combatant of the unit, ultra-linked to a series of crystals he is a durable, agile and razor-sharp fighter.
- Chomp Link (voiced by Samuel Vincent) is the brawn of the unit, ultra-linked with a venus flytrap he is equipped with long vines and crushing jaws. It is unknown what happened to Chomp after Mega Metal Elementor launched him off a Makino Destroyer and into space in "My Best Friend is an Ultralink" after he, Blast, and Prism failed him.
- Reaper Links are a pair of Ultra-linked reaper hologram Halloween decorations armed with Scythe's and equipped with the ability to switch between solid and intangible at will, resulting in a pair of ghost like stealth operatives.
- Plaztek (voiced by Andrew Francis) is an Ultralink that bonded with Fishy and some of Toxzon's orange waste to become a large fish-like creature composed of super dense and strong plastic. Able to fire plastic fish with large teeth for trapping opponents, toxic goo, plastic explosives, and is a versatile shape-shiftier. As a result of the glitchy connection between Fishy and the Ultralink Plaztek has a highly unstable personality and speech pattern that sounds like a corrupted sound-file. Appears to be destroyed at the end of "Toxic Relationship".
- Avatak (voiced by Richard Ian Cox) is an Ultralink that bonded with a video game console because of Toxzon in the episode "Digital Meltdown". He has the ability to shoot fireballs, he can also shoot a powerful laser from his chest, he can also hack into games on the type of video game console he bonded with. Avatak was destroyed by the end of the episode because of the glitch in the Max Steel TURBO Warrior video game, which overloaded his systems.

- The Elementors (Fire and Air, voiced by Andrew Francis; Earth and Water, voiced by Brian Drummond; Metal voiced by Trevor Devall) are Ultralinks that each manifested a body from the elements and are able to combine themselves into multi-elemental creatures. Originally, there were a group of four Elementors based around the four elements that were sent to Earth to aid Dredd for their own agenda. The first three, Fire Elementor, Earth Elementor, and Water Elementor, were eventually captured by N-Tek. But during an attempted rescue by Air Elementor in "Elements of Surprise", due to an accident with an inhibitor mounted on his head, the four Elementors' bodies ended up being fused into the 4-cored Ultimate Elementor that uses all their powers and combine them to produce ice and lightning. Though the four personalities conflicted at first, they eventually put aside their squabbles for their mutual hatred towards Max Steel. In season two, a Megalink Elementor named Metal Elementor is introduced in "Full Metal Racket". In "Ultralink Hunter'", Metal Elementor sets Ultimate Elementor up by giving him 24 hours to catch Max Steel. After Ultimate Elementor is defeated after managing to catch Steel and Ven-Ghan, Metal Elementor reveals his ruse and absorbs Ultimate Elementor to become the 5-cored Mega Elementor.

- Fire Elementor (voiced by Andrew Francis) is an Ultralink bonded with the element of fire.
- Earth Elementor (voiced by Brian Drummond) is an Ultralink bonded with the element of earth.
- Water Elementor (voiced by Brian Drummond) is an Ultralink bonded with the element of water.
- Air Elementor (voiced by Andrew Francis) is an Ultralink bonded with the element of air.
- Ultimate Elementor (Ultimate Fire and Ultimate Air, voiced by Andrew Francis; Ultimate Earth and Ultimate Water, voiced by Brian Drummond):
- Metal Elementor (voiced by Trevor Devall) is a Megalink named Metallak bonded with a metal statue.
- Mega Elementor (Mega Fire and Mega Air, voiced by Andrew Francis; Mega Earth and Mega Water, voiced by Brian Drummond; Mega Metal voiced by Trevor Devall):

- Dr. Tytus Octavius Xander/Toxzon (voiced by Andrew Francis): Formerly a THI scientist after Molly fired him, Xander was mutated after a lab accident with deadly chemicals, transforming him into the mutant villain, Toxzon. He can absorb pollutants and uses them as weapons and can generate venomous monsters. He can also transform into multiple forms by absorbing new poisons and toxins in different color: normal (green), neutralized (blue), acid (orange), toxic bacteria (purple), radiation (yellow), mind control serum (lavender), his mysterious orange toxin (orange), and oil (black).

- Fishy (voiced by Andrew Francis) is Toxzon's beloved pet plastic goldfish. Xander hallucinates that Fishy talks to him; apparently, he's a source of his sanity giving him advice and suggestions. In Season 2's "Toxic Relationship", he was bonded with an Ultralink and turned into Plaztek, but subsequently meets his end in the hands of Max Steel thanks to his TURBO Drills, which resulted in making Toxzon a more dangerous threat.
- Goopanoids are toxic monstrous mutant creatures generated by Toxzon and used as his henchmen. Toxzon can generate different versions in different colors of his goopanoids whenever he absorbs a new toxin: his green toxin (green), acid (orange), toxic bacteria (purple), and radiation (yellow).

- Troy Winter/Extroyer (voiced by Brian Drummond) is a professional criminal named Troy Winter who after being accidentally bonded with a damaged Ultra-Link, became a beastly creation who can morph into any animal just by scanning it with his eyes. His left arm is covered in self regenerating crystals and is used to destroy others in battle. He can so far transform into anything he sees, but he can absorb D.N.A. of dead life-forms and become the extinct beings. His primal transformations are these beasts: his pet black tiger, a spider, a shark, a black cobra, a gorilla, a Tyrannosaurus Rex, a wasp, a Scorpion, a corrupted version of Max Steel's Strength mode, and an ultralinked electrical worm alien. If he has a second Ultra-Link in his body, he can transform into a chimeric monster.

- Dwayne (voiced by Brian Dobson) is one of Extroyer's henchmen. Dwayne is smarter and acts like a boss for Vin. He's hated Winter a lot since "Thrill of the Hunt", he tried to feed them to his pet black tiger. In "Makino Strikes: Part 1", it's revealed that Dwayne has kids that don't know he's a thief.
- Vin (voiced by Michael Dobson) is another of Extroyer's henchmen who is thin, and sometimes clumsy and dumb. He hates anchovies, as mentioned in Driven. He is a little bit scared at times and he would sometimes be brave.

- Murukami was a ninja in Ancient Japan who seeks his mission, to conquer the world. Murukami was imprisoned in a magic sword by a sorcerer who warned that if anyone ever gripped the sword, he would be released and would wreak havoc on the earth. Murukami's spirit possessed Kirby when he held the sword that a shop vendor and descendant of the sorcerer hid his backpack. Max and Steel were able to use the Turbo Sword to break the magic sword and freed Kirby from Murukami.
- Colonel Jasper F. Castle (voiced by Lee Tockar) is a former colonel in the US Army, he and his men's loyalties were bought by Miles Dredd. Using them, Dredd lured Max into a trap. Luckily, a traitorous member who was new to them called N-Tek and together they defeated and apprehended Castle and his men and chased Dredd and Naught off.
- Rygnok (voiced by Brian Drummond) is an Ultralink Hunter working for the Black Star Council who once a mentor and old friend to Ven-Ghan. Rygnok is a bounty hunter who will hunt anything for the right price. After Makino tore a destructive path through the galaxy, Rygnok began working for the Black Star Council. Unlike Ven-Ghan who is all about bringing Ultralinks to Justice, Rygnok cares more about being paid his reward money.
- Guamá is Rygnok's robotic lizard that he uses as a mount.
- Morphos (voiced by Brian Dobson) is a monster designed by N-Tek, as a last resort to destroy Makino should they fail to defend the Earth. It came out that Morphos is stronger than anything. It was predicted that because of this, he wouldn't stop destroying and become a bigger threat than Makino. He has the ability to copy modes of any character. Morphos has the DNA of Miles Dredd and sometimes refers him as his father. His previous weakness was that he is able to turn into one mode at a time, but can now mix his modes since after he was turned into goop by Dredd, he regenerated himself and came out with a mix of modes.
- Mortum is a new villain arising two years after the events of Maximum Morphos. Once a successful scientist, he became obsessed with surpassing his own mortality and went after a device named Connect-Tek, who would give him god-like abilities - and thus triggering the events of the Team Turbo film. However, the device ends up damaged on his hands and it blows up on his face, turning him into a technologic zombie. Cruel, threatening and intimidating, he was one of Max's worst villains and wanted to take over the world by turning everyone into beings like him, but he is eventually stopped by Max and his team.
- Terrorax/Dr. Prometheus Halifax is a new major villain introduced in Turbo-Charged. A member of a mysterious organization named Nexus, he studied Max's activities and energy for years. In the future, he captures Max and forces him to generate a new variation of his T.U.R.B.O. Energy and in the process ends up getting a portion of his blue energy to create his own version known as Terror Energy. After mutating himself and adopting the name of Terrorax, he becomes one of Max's most powerful enemies and had his own team of supervillain named Team Terror, who were evil counterparts of Max and his team. He is eventually defeated and returns with his most powerful weapon: the Pantheon, and planned on forcing people join the Nexus.
  - Night Howl is a mechanically enhanced predator who serves as the evil counterpart of La Fiera. He has superhuman conditions and is capable of turning himself into a large wolf.
  - Snare is a lethal assassin robot created by an unknown individual who was later murdered by his own creation. He has many weapons integrated onto his body and has murdered countless people over the years as stated in "Turbo-Charged". He is Tempestra's evil counterpart.
  - Monstro is a monstrosity capable of turning cloning himself. He serves as the evil counterpart of C.Y.T.R.O..

=== Others ===
- Bartholomew "Butch" (voiced by Brian Drummond) is the school bully who torments Max, Kirby, and others. Bartholomew also has two sidekicks. In "My Best Friend is an Ultralink", Butch suffered the same fate as Forge did when he was ultralinked. But at the end of the episode Ven-Ghan managed to unlink him. After the events of the episode, he eventually becomes friends with Max, Kirby, and Sydney.
- Dr. Thornhill (voiced by Michael Dobson) is one of Max's teachers at Copper Canyon High School.
- Mr. Jones (voiced by Michael Dobson) was the old man who checked Max's driver's test.
- Klean Kal (voiced by Scott McNeil) was the man in Driven, who was the one who was selling used cars to Kirby and Max.
- Vendor (voiced by Vincent Tong) was the old man who was selling old things, and he had the sword of Murukami. He's been later seen in various episodes as a random vendor.
- Commander Parker (voiced by Vincent Tong) is originally a member of Colonel Castle's army in the first-season episode Uncle Sam Wants You! until Castle's alliance with Miles Dredd was exposed, thanks to Parker reaching out to N-Tek. It was revealed in the second-season episode Deep Turbo Blue Sea that he joined N-Tek after Colonel Castle was arrested.
- T.J. (voiced by Kathleen Barr) is a female artificial intelligence with the Turbo Jet, whom Steel has a crush on.
- Jimmy Blaze (voiced by Sam Vincent)
- Dean (voiced by Lee Tockar)
- Jake (voiced by Giles Panton)
- Torbolt (voiced by Andrew Francis) is an Ultralink who rebels against Makino.

== N-Tek/Turbo arsenal ==
- TURBO Modes: When Max and Steel link together, they combine into powerful TURBO Modes.
  - Base: In Base Mode, Max Steel wears a suit made of techno-organic plate-like layers that help to harvest and focus Turbo Energy. It contains Max's TURBO Energy so he won't explode and cannot be removed. It amplifies and stabilizes TURBO Energy and enhances Max's strength, speed, durability, agility, senses, and fighting capabilities. Base Mode is also known as the Steel-Suit.
  - Strength: In Strength Mode, Max Steel is larger, stronger and much more powerful. Giving him maximum strength in combat, he is able to lift over 200 tons. Though the armor increases power and defense, it decreases agility. It is also capable of withstanding a nuclear blast. Max Steel first used TURBO Strength Mode against Fire Elementor. This is the third and final mode accessed by Steel using Mimic Mode.
  - Camouflage: This mode allows Max to blend in with civilians and protect his secret identity as Max Steel.
  - Flight: In Flight Mode, Max Steel can rocket through the atmosphere with control and maneuverability. With increase in penetration and scope, he is able to reach altitudes beyond the stratosphere, though, limits the drag and increases lift. Max Steel first used TURBO Flight Mode while training with Berto. In Season 2, somehow the Flight Mode looks slightly different in design.
  - Scuba: In Scuba Mode, Max Steel can maneuver underwater like an aquatic being. Existing in this form, he is able to breathe underwater and swim with agility and grace. It lacks in power and speed, but it gets the job done. It was used in "Hard Water" when Max Steel fought Water Elementor after he had captured humans to power his Starship and go home. This mode was rarely used by Max Steel as it was only used for water themed mission.
  - Super: This TURBO Mode resembles a superhero costume, which Max finds too ridiculous, even though Steel loves it. In this mode, Max can fly, has laser vision, increased strength, speed, durability and other abilities Max hasn't unlocked yet but are apparently, voice activated. Activation Phrases include KA-POW (Activates Laser Vision), KA-BOOM (Gives Physical Attacks Extra Power), and Let's Jet (Flight). This was the first mode accessed by Steel using Mimic Mode.
  - Speed: In Speed Mode, Max Steel can run at incredible velocity. Moving at super-sonic speed (going up to 100,000 mph), it causes extremely high levels of aerodynamic efficiency. It minimizes delay and maximizes intervention time. Max Steel used Speed Mode to fight Elementor. In Season 2, somehow Speed Mode has been added green stripes to it.
  - Stealth: In Stealth Mode, Max Steel can move in the shadows with ease. With the suit in dark colors, he is able to turn invisible and is unseen to the naked eye. He has increased in agility, speed and a satisfactory in power.
  - Cannon: In Cannon Mode, Max Steel is very large and sturdy like Strength Mode, but more armored. When charged with enough TURBO Energy, he can fire himself at enemies like a cannonball, doing extreme amounts of damage, then it wastes a vast amount of TURBO Energy as a result, this also the second mode accessed by Steel using Mimic Mode.
  - Clone: In Clone Mode, Max Steel can generate unlimited number of clones to outnumber enemies, confuse and take them down. Also can be used in combination with other modes to swarm and overwhelm his enemies.
  - Mimic: This mode allows Steel to mimic some of Max's TURBO Modes, but overusing it makes them unable to change to another mode. So far, Steel has mimicked Super, Cannon, and Strength. This is also Steel's first TURBO mode.
  - Heat: In Heat Mode, Max Steel is able to generate fire through his arm-mounted blasters. Those flaming blasts are so intense that Max was able to melt Metal Elementor, but at the cost of large amounts of TURBO energy, thus he is not able to maintain it for long.
  - Rocket: A powerful mode with four TURBO blasters that gives Max Steel orbital propulsion and wide firing range. Max was able to unlock Rocket Mode via a special code his father told him, making himself able to stand his ground even against the unstoppable Makino, but requires a lot of T.U.R.B.O. energy.
  - Spike: An agile, ninja-like mode equipped with turbo charged energy spikes and telescoping spike-whips. The spikes covering Max Steel's suit can also be fired as projectiles and extended.
  - Nova: A new TURBO Mode unlocked in Steel's memory by Jim McGrath for Max to battle Makino's clones. It has durability, flight capabilities and three powerful cannons on his hands and over his head. First seen in The Wrath of Makino.
  - Annihilation: A TURBO Mode that Makino forced Max to create this mode. This mode is big, has durability, can shoot lasers and summon a Destabilizing Drill. It debuted in The Wrath of Makino
  - Titan: A gigantic mode used by Max and Steel in order to battle a giant-sized Makino, who had taken control of Jim McGrath's body. In this mode, Max can use the spikes on his back as swords. First seen in The Wrath of Makino.
  - Cannon Spike: A fusion of Turbo Cannon Mode and Turbo Spike Mode. This mode was created after Max and Steel unlocked the power to combine their TURBO modes thanks to the TURBO energy from the TURBO chamber in Jim McGrath's Tachyon ship and was used to defeat Morphos, who couldn't copy this mode since he could only adapt to one power at one time. In Cannon Spike Mode, Max Steel has superhuman strength and durability, can launch himself at enemies like TURBO Cannon mode and do extra damage thanks to the spikes on his body, can launch projectile spikes like TURBO Spike mode, and can extend large spike whips from his arms that end with spiked flails. This is the first fusion created by Max and Steel. It debuted in Dawn of Morphos.
  - Hydro Heat: A fusion of Turbo Scuba Mode and Turbo Heat Mode. This mode comes with two hydro heat cannons. The right cannon can shoot fire just like TURBO Heat Mode while the left cannon can shoot streams of high pressure water. When both cannons are used at once, they can generate large amounts of steam to blind enemies. TURBO Scuba mode's underwater powers are turned into water powers when it is combined with Heat mode to create this mode hence the name. This is the second fusion created by Max and Steel. It debuted in Maximum Morphos.
  - Sonic Flight: A fusion of Turbo Sonic Mode and Turbo Flight Mode. This TURBO mode allows Max Steel to fly just like Turbo Flight Mode and launch sonic waves from the sound emitters on his body just like Turbo Sonic Mode. This mode can fly at high speeds like Flight mode and thanks to the combined power from Sonic mode, it can fly at supersonic speeds and is one of Max Steel's fastest TURBO modes. This is the third and last fusion created by Max and Steel. It debuted in Maximum Morphos.
  - Exo Strength: A larger version of Max's TURBO Strength Mode, with more power and mobility, as well as the ability to launch his big fists as projectiles. This mode was seen on Maximum Morphos.
  - Hammer Claw: A new experimental mode solely seen in "Team Turbo".
  - Prime Mode: A new mode that Max obtained in "Team Turbo". He gets the ability of flight and a pair of Turbo swords.
  - Hunter Mode: A new mode created solely to undo Mortum's brainwashing on Team Turbo during the events of "Team Turbo Fusion Tek". Max gets increased stealthiness and a wide array of weapons to hunt his foes.
  - Armor Mode: Max's first completely technological mode. He obtains it during "Turbo-Charged". He obtains a Turbo sword and a shield which is durable against Terrorax's Terror Energy. It resembles a knight due to its design and weapons.
  - Jet Pack Mode: Max's second technological mode; he obtains a jet-like vehicle which allows him to fly in high speed and can reconfigure itself into various forms. It debuted on "Turbo-Warriors".
  - Wave Rider Mode: Max's third technological mode; he gets a techno surfboard with missile launchers. It debuted on "Turbo-Warriors".
  - Sniper Mode: Max's fourth technological mode; he gets a rifle which can shoot concentrated green Turbo rays and a dagger. It debuted on "Turbo-Warriors".
  - Rocket Launcher: Max's fifth technological mode; he gets a spear and was activated along with Alex as a bionic panther. It debuted on "Turbo-Warriors".
  - Mountain Attack: Max's sixth technological mode; he gets a pair of pickaxes and climbing equipment. It debuted on "Turbo-Warriors".
- Jim McGrath's TURBO Modes: In the TV movie The Wrath of Makino, Jim links with Steel after a very long time, once more becoming the legendary Ja'em Mk'rah, the original Max Steel. While trying to save Max from Makino's control, Jim displayed some of his own TURBO Modes.
  - Base: Jim's techno-organic suit, first used in his attempt to repel Makino's invasion in Tachyon.
  - Sky Stinger: A flight-based mode, equivalent to Flight Mode.
  - Sonic: A TURBO Mode that can launch powerful sonic waves. Max and Steel combined this mode with Turbo Flight Mode to create Turbo Sonic Flight Mode.
  - Gauntlet: A mode with a massive right hand used for close combat. It is probably Jim's counterpart to Strength Mode.

N-Tek carries a vast amount of weaponry and vehicles that runs on TURBO Energy, being at the disposal of the N-Tek agents and Max Steel.

- Turbo-Rang: As a primary weapon for Max Steel, Steel after being fully charged with TURBO Energy, acts as a boomerang, although Steel ends up being dizzy.
- Turbo Blaster: The ultimate long-range weapon developed by Steel and Berto to deliver powerful bursts of TURBO Energy, which can only be operated by Max Steel. It has specialized functionality for TURBO Energy propulsion and fires at a range of 150 yards. After Steel links up with the Turbo Blaster, it's literally TURBOFied in its long-range. Max Steel used the TURBO Blaster to defeat Air Elementor by hitting his Orb.
- Turbo Sword: The perfect weapon for close-up fighting or when up against robots. The blade is made of pure TURBO Energy capable of slicing through heavy metal. When Steel is linked with it, he transforms the sword making it TURBOfied.
- Turbo Lash: A TURBO-powered whip that can ensnare and shock anyone and anything in its path.
- Turbo Cycle: This vehicle combines the engineering genius of Berto and N-Tek with the slick alien technology of Steel. It can reach up to over 500 mph. It also defy physics and the force of gravity for wall riding and out-of-this-world stunts and jumps. When TURBOFied by Steel, the Turbo Cycle increases in performance.
- Turbo Car: Once an old truck belonging to Vin and Dwayne, Max and Kirby bought this car only to have Max's little problem with his Turbo Touch. Luckily, Berto fixed it with a TURBO Interface, thus making it TURBOFied. This vehicle has a missile launcher, High-Speed, auto GPS and a Stealth Mode.
- Turbo Jet: In the air or in deep-sea, the Turbo Jet equips Max for an all-terrain turbo assault on the enemy. It contains a female artificial intelligence nicknamed TJ.
- Turbo Drills: A pair of powerful drill gauntlets that Max Steel uses in Strength Mode. They can penetrate even the hardest of materials.
- Turbo Star: Jim McGrath's mysterious Turbo weapon, designed to be the ultimate defense against Makino and his invasion army. Years ago, Miles Dredd sabotaged it, resulting in his transformation and Jim McGrath's death. Now Dredd, Max and Steel are secretly looking for it.
- Furbo: A robotic dog built by Berto to be Steel's pet.
- R.O.C.C. (Remote Operational Command Center): It serves as a mobile command center and combat unit for N-Tek agents in the field. It's loaded with state-of-the-art equipment such as advanced surveillance apparatus, scientific analysis lab, and a fully loaded armory.
- Jump Jet: This high-altitude jet is the perfect air assault vehicle, ideal for low-space missions. It serves as Jefferson and Kat's main combat units.
- Hopper: The helicopters that N-Tek uses. Used for transporting personal and weapons.
- Connect-Tek: A powerful device introduced in "Team Turbo". It was created by Jim McGrath based on Steel's technology. It allows the user to create anything that comes up on their minds, such as armors. Years before the series' events, a scientist named Mortum heard of the device and was bent on stealing it for surpassing his own mortality. This triggers the events of "Team Turbo", in which the titular team is created and in the end the device ends up encrusted on Mortum's skull, which turns him into a robotic zombie.

== Episodes ==
Season	Episodes	Originally released		
Season	Episodes	First released	Last released	Network
1	26	March 25, 2013	December 7, 2013	Disney XD
2	26	August 15, 2014	December 6, 2014	Netflix
Films	7	June 27, 2015	July 29, 2017	TBC

== Broadcast ==
Max Steel was first broadcast on March 1, 2013, on Cartoon Network (Latin America) and on March 2, 2013, on Disney XD (Poland). It aired on Teletoon in Canada on March 24, 2013, and on Disney XD in the United States on March 25, 2013. It later premiered on Nicktoons (UK & Ireland), CITV, Canal J, Cartoon Network (Italy) and Boing, Cartoon Network (Spain), Boing, Panda Biggs, and 2BE. In Hungary, the series premiered on April 17, 2013, on Megamax and on September 9, 2013, on RTL Klub. It premiered on Cartoon Network (India) on July 20, 2013. In Greece, Max Steel was broadcast firstly from Disney XD Greece and it also started airing on July 7, 2013, from Star Channel. The second season premiered on August 12, 2013, on Teletoon and on April 12, 2014, in Latin America. Season 2 never aired on Disney XD in the United States due to the low ratings of the first season. Reruns of the second season began airing on KidsClick in the United States on July 3, 2017, until June 15, 2018.

== Reception ==
The series received generally mixed reviews from critics, with praise given for Andrew Francis' voice performance of Max McGrath, though aspects of the animation were critiqued. In her review for Common Sense Media, Emily Ashby praised Max Steel, giving it a 4/5. She called the use of bullies and struggles in school "relatable," and said that "Max Steel's likable attitude, sense of humor, and clear vision of right and wrong make him a viable modern superhero for teens." In his review for Media Life Magazine, Tom Conroy said Max Steel was "Cobbled together from ready-made sources with no apparent interest in coming up with a fresh twist or a new slant, it fails to make much of an impression, either positive or negative." He criticized the use of bullies, new school, dead father, and shadowy mentor, saying they "are so overused that the writers of this series might have assumed they were obligatory and thus didn't feel they were being lazy." He also criticized the graphics, citing them as "creaky" and "bizarrely artificial."

The show was also nominated for the BAFTA 2014 Kids' Vote television category.

== Live-action adaptation ==
Paramount Pictures planned to remake Max Steel as a motion picture. Originally, Taylor Lautner had been confirmed to star in the lead role as Josh McGrath. In March 2010, Lautner dropped out of the film in favor of Hasbro and Universal's Stretch Armstrong.

Due to the relaunch of Max Steel in 2013, all plans for a live-action movie were suspended. On August 2, 2013, it was revealed that Dolphin Entertainment was working on a Max Steel film. Christopher Yost would be writing while Stewart Hendler was attached to direct. The film follows along the plotline of the reboot and not the original series, and was distributed by Open Road Films, originally with a 2014 release but was later pushed to October 14, 2016. On February 6, 2014, the studio cast Ben Winchell as Max Steel and Ana Villafane as his love interest Sofia Martinez. On April 29, 2014, actor Andy Garcia is cast in the role of Dr. Miles Edwards, a brilliant and mysterious scientist. On May 20, 2014, actor Mike Doyle was cast in a role.
