= List of Max Steel (2013 TV series) episodes =

Max Steel is a science fiction–comedy CGI–animated television series co-produced by Mattel Playground Productions, Nerd Corps Entertainment and FremantleMedia Enterprises. It is a re-imagining of its 2000-2002 predecessor and both series are based on the Mattel action-figure of the same name. Max Steel premiered on March 25, 2013 and ended on December 6, 2014.

== Series overview ==
Season	Episodes	Originally released		
Season	Episodes	First released	Last released	Network
1	26	March 25, 2013	December 7, 2013	Disney XD
2	26	August 15, 2014	December 6, 2014	Netflix
Films	7	June 27, 2015	July 29, 2017	TBC

== Episode list ==
=== Season 1 (2013) ===
No. overall	No. in season	Title	Directed by	Written by	Original release date	U.S. viewers (millions)
1	1	"Come Together"	Logan McPherson & Steve Sacks	Matthew Drdek & Lloyd Goldfine	March 25, 2013	N/A
2	2	"Come Together"	Michael Dowding	Matthew Drdek & Lloyd Goldfine	March 26, 2013	N/A
3	3	"Come Together"	Daniel Ife	Matthew Drdek & Lloyd Goldfine	March 27, 2013	N/A
Part 1: When Teenager Max McGrath moves to a new town, an encounter with school bullies leads him to discover he can generate T.U.R.B.O (Tachyon Unlimited Radiant Bio-Optimized) Energy. He is then found by his Uncle Ferrus, who is part of a secret program called N-Tek, who tells Max his father Jim, and his partner Miles Dredd also worked there before their deaths from a laboratory explosion. The last thing Max's dad worked on was an old machine, but it doesn't work anymore. But then Max reactivates it with his TURBO Energy, revealing it to be containing a cybernetic alien being known as Steel, who bonds with Max, now allowing him to control his powers. Meanwhile, Dredd sends the evil Fire Elementor to capture Max, and the episode ends with Max being thrown off a cliff. Part 2: Uncle Ferrus saves Max from falling by catching him in his plane. Inside Steel suppresses Max's TURBO energy signal, making sure Dredd can't trace him. Max then goes home and hides his newfound powers from his mom. Meanwhile, his mom, Molly McGrath, infiltrates the enemy's headquarters, gathering data, and then calls Ferrus to meet with her and talk about what she saw. At school, Max returns Sydney's phone (he accidentally took hers and she took his in the previous episode), and then goes to N-Tek to train against robots, unlocking his ability to fly. He is then called by Sydney to go on a date. While there, he leaves Steel in the boys' bathroom so he may talk to Sydney alone. He tells her he really likes her, and just as they're about to kiss, Fire Elementor and Earth Elementor show up to capture Max, having tracked him. Uncle Ferrus and Molly pick him up, and Ferrus explains taking off Steel allowed his TURBO energy to be traceable. Steel catches up, and bonds with Max to fight the Elementors, with Ferrus and his mom also fighting using laser guns. Max charges Steel up and then throws like a boomerang at the Fire Elementor's core, snuffing him out, but then the Elementor falls and crushes Steel. Finally, Max, Ferrus, and Molly (Max's mom) are knocked out by the Earth Elementor, who captures Max and rescues his brother. The episode ends with Miles Dredd holding Max captive in his headquarters and draining Max of his TURBO energy, energizing him. Part 3: Miles Dredd continues to hold Max captive, and Molly, Ferrus, Steel, and N-Tek must save him. Steel flies through an air vent in the enemy's headquarters to find Max. Meanwhile, Uncle Ferrus tells Molly if Steel doesn't reconnect with Max in 8 hours, Max's powers will overload and Steel will shut down. Miles reveals to Max that he was behind the explosion that killed Max's father and created a machine to absorb TURBO Energy, but the explosion permanently connected the device to Miles. Max gets angry at this revelation, releasing more TURBO Energy, but Miles again absorbs it. The TURBO Energy Miles originally absorbed from the explosion kept him alive for 16 years until now. Finally, Steel saves Max, and the two fuse to escape, but Miles captures Steel. He shuts Steel down and hooks him up to a machine meant to kill everyone in Copper Canyon so Miles can gain more TURBO Energy, their devices feeding off each civilian. Soon N-Tek and Max invade the headquarters, faced with robots and the Elementors. Max goes looking for Steel and runs into Miles' assistant, Naught, who transforms into a cyborg, but Max easily gets rid of him off the elevator. Max then rescues Steel, deactivating the machine and trying to fight Miles, but he just absorbs their attacks and grows more powerful. Finally, Max has an idea: he and Steel release all the TURBO Energy they can, and as they fly to space with Miles, a huge explosion occurs. Molly starts to cry but then sees Max survived. Reporters arrive at the scene and ask who the hero is, with Max and Steel replying conjointly forming the name "Max Steel." Ferrus asks Molly if they knew their existence was meant to be secret and has her continue working at THI to sort the mess. In the aftermath of the fight, Miles Dredd is seen floating in space, but his Naught appears in a ship, rescues him, and they return to Earth.
4	4	"Cleaning House"	Logan McPherson & Dustin McKenzie	Matthew Drdek	April 6, 2013	N/A
After trying deadly experiments to clean every form of toxins on the planet, Dr. Titas Octavious Xander is fired from THI by Max's mom Molly. To get revenge for his termination of employment, he poisons everyone in THI with his uncompleted formula, turning them into zombie-like creatures. He returns to his lab with his plastic pet goldfish Fishy, who he neurotically converses with, and fights Max Steel. He accidentally undergoes a mutation into a super-strong mutant with toxic powers when he tries to get Fishy out of a venomous drainage filled with toxic waste. Max Steel struggles against the empowered Xander but defeats him to get an anti-serum to cure the Zombie-like THI people. However, Xander escapes into the sewers and swears revenge on the world with Fishy, dubbing himself "Toxzon".
5	5	"Secret Identity Crisis"	Logan McPherson & Daniel Ife	Benjamin Townsend	April 13, 2013	N/A
Max must deal with the issue of keeping his secret identity as Max Steel, so Miles Dredd doesn't come after him through his friends and family to siphon his limitless TURBO energy. This is even more difficult as Dredd has analyzed the Max Steel sightings and has pinpointed Copper Canyon High as the epicenter. When the school is repeatedly attacked, school bully Butch is mistakenly credited as the hero when Max tries to be more inconspicuous. But on a field trip through the canyon, Dredd appears and goes after Butch. Dredd immediately realizes Butch isn't Max Steel, and Butch sells out Max, practically exposing him to the students on the bus as Max Steel. Kirby tries to play hero and knocks a weakened Dredd off the edge of a cliff, with the student body hailing him as a hero. After Dredd is defeated, a holo-bot is used to establish that Max Steel and Max MacGrath are two different people, securing Max's secret. Dredd escapes and plans to use force, not manipulation, to capture and drain Max Steel's TURBO Energy.
6	6	"C.Y.T.R.O. Attacks!"	Logan McPherson & Jeremy Brown	Alexx Van Dyne	April 20, 2013	N/A
When Max blows up another of Berto's CYTRO bots, Steel helps to build another when he and Max argue over who is more important in the Max Steel hero. However, Max sees Berto and Steel bonding as better friends than Max and Steel. Later, the latest robot unit is wirelessly hijacked by an unknown enemy wanting to raid the Vault, where all the worst weapons on Earth are stored. Max finds out it is Toxzon, who wrecks the whole base searching for a chemical warhead labeled the Tox-Bomb. Toxzon is revealed to have worked at N-TEK before THI, as he was fired for mental instability. Max, Steel, and Berto follow CYTRO to Toxzon's lair and disarm the Tox-Bomb before it destroys the city with a Cherobyll-like explosion. In the end, Toxzon is taken into custody, and Max, Berto, and Steel reaffirm their friendships.
7	7	"Hard Water"	Logan McPherson & Jeremy Brown	Mark Hoffmeier	April 27, 2013	N/A
When a string of unusual water anomalies wreaks havoc on Copper Canyon, Max Steel goes behind N-Tek's back to investigate. Each of the events involves something near or on the water, like a tanker or a THI satellite launcher. Max unveils his TURBO Scuba Mode when searching the ocean floor and finds a cavern. There, Max & Steel finds the source of all the anomalies, a Water Elementor who reveals that Elementors are Ultra-Links, Steel's native species. Water Elementor reveals he plans to rebuild his Starship and go home and is using captured humans as bio-fuel to charge the Spaceship. Max Steel wins the battle by tossing Limestone and Clay rocks to turn the Water Elementor into cement. After saving the captives, Ferris shows Max how to throw a perfect pitch for better control, and Steel ponders how he is connected to the Elementors who are also Ultra-Links.
8	8	"The Thrill of the Hunt"	Logan McPherson & Gino Nichele	Rich Fogel	June 22, 2013	N/A
N-TEK brings in Max and Steel to the arctic where a Starship is found of similar design to Water Elementor's. Steel is the only one who could pass the force field around it without harm and disables the field for N-TEK to enter the craft. After acquiring what they came for, N-TEK blows the place up. En route to N-TEK HQ, the ground convoy is sneak attacked by mercenary Troy Winter, who easily gets the package and proceeds to take it to Miles Dredd. Naught arrives for the package, an Ultra-Link, but refuses payment due to its damage. Dredd tells Winter where to find the rest of the package for his full pay: the CEO's office at THI. Steel reviews his memories with Max and finds out that he is an alien, and question Forge about why he destroyed the spaceship. At THI, Molly holds off Winter, but he still escapes with the component. After a motorcycle chase, the Fire and Earth Elementors stall Max so Dredd can receive the package. After seeing the power of the Ultra-Link, Troy wants it for himself. The fight with the Elementors ends quickly with Forge's arrival, and the Fire Elementor is taken prisoner. When Winter activates a failsafe in the case Dredd placed in case of a betrayal, Winter fuses with the damaged Ultra-Link. Max and Steel are shocked to learn what the package really was, and a mutated Winter watches them.
9	9	"Extroyer Unleashed"	Logan McPherson & Craig McEwen	Rich Fogel	June 29, 2013	N/A
After the damaged Ultra-Link bonds with master criminal Troy Winter, it transforms him into a mutant that is able to "extract" animal DNA and "become" warped versions of them, in essence, an "Extroyer". He goes after Miles Dredd, raiding his labs ars retribution for mutating him, and battles with Max Steel. After Dredd incapacitates Extroyer, he makes a deal to cure him, in exchange for delivering Max Steel to Dredd's hands. At a missile test site, Max Steel fights Extroyer only to fight out that their battleground was designed by Dredd to siphon as much TURBO Energy from Max to fuel a nuclear warhead aimed at Copper Canyon. The heroes go to prevent its impact, only to be countered by Extroyer, but they successfully are rid of him and detonate the missile in the Thermosphere. At N-TEK, Steel presses Forge for answers about how many Ultra-Links are really out there, and Forge only answers "millions" which makes both Max and Steel arise more questions. At the bottom of the ocean, Extroyer extracts a shark, allowing him to survive.
10	10	"Live by the Sword"	Logan McPherson & Daniel Ife	Matthew Drdek	July 6, 2013	N/A
Max, Kirby, and Sydney go to a flea market and encounter a goon harassing an elderly merchant selling Asian weaponry. As Kirby plays with a Bo staff distracting the goon, the merchant places a sword into Kirby's backpack. The goon then closes the booth and trashes the merchant's materials looking for the sword, which he is under orders to find by Mr. Naught. Naught seeks the cursed sword of Murukami, to become a force to be reckoned with. After Kirby realizes he has the sword, he tries to be rid of it only to see it won't leave his grip whatsoever, and he is possessed by the Ronin spirit in the sword. Muru-Kirby's rampage attracts Max Steel, and Max not willing to fight a friend chases him through the city as Muru-Kirby destroys whatever gets in his way. The two then duke it out, the sword trashes the armored Steel suit, Max loses the fight, and N-TEK arrives on scene for a report. The merchant from before is found by Berto and he explains the history of the sword: in ancient Japan, a forger created a sword more powerful than anything on Earth, but cursed it to trap the wielder in the blade, Murukami the Ninja. Naught follows Muru-Kirby, captures him, but Muru-Kirby breaks out. Naught and Muru-Kirby battle on the roof of the ship, but they damaged the craft causing it to crash, so they move to the roof of the N-TEK aircraft. The N-TEK crew abandon ship while Max pursues Naught and Muru-Kirby, only for Muru-Kirby to put up a massive fight, until CYTRO arrives to back up Max. Berto developed a TURBO Sword for Max to defeat Murukami, so Steel can fuse with the sword as Steel isn't from the Earth, so once the sword is broken Kirby will be free. The plan works and Kirby is freed, and the merchant gives him a foam staff for the whole event. Later, Dredd learns of Naught's plan and "reminds" both him and the goon why they should be loyal only to Dredd.
11	11	"Supermania"	Logan McPherson & Jeremy Brown	Brandon Auman	July 13, 2013	N/A
Toxzon escapes from prison and seeks vengeance on Max Steel by literally wiping Copper Canyon from the map. N-TEK keeps their eyes open, especially Steel, who gets some ideas from the comic book of a prison guard on superheroes. Steel's fascination with the comic book hero goes overboard when he spends all night reading about superheroes and orders boxes of comics. When Toxzon attacks a chemical treatment plant, Steel unveils a "new" uniform resembling a stereotype caped hero and others reminiscent of different heroes. Toxzon and Max Steel battle in the warehouse outside the facility, but Steel's ridiculous behavior allows Toxzon a chance to escape. Steel refuses to alter the suit, much to Max's humiliation, and Berto finds out Toxzon's plan: poisoning the city's water supply. When Max and Steel find Toxzon, he is actually planning on creating acid rain strong enough to melt buildings. The heroes battle an army of Goop soldiers with CYTRO, who gives Max the counter-agent to end the toxic storm. Steel fakes losing the 1-on-1 fight with Toxzon and injects the counter-agent into the villain, who ends the storm on his own. But Toxzon still manages to escape. When Max finally asks why Steel is obsessing over cliché comic book references, Steel sees himself in the alien off-world origins of some heroes. The two reconcile and agree to return to the primary uniform.
12	12	"Uncle Sam Wants You!"	Logan McPherson & Gino Nichele	George Krstic	July 20, 2013	N/A
Max and Steel chase down some bad guys downtown who stole weapons from the Army. One of Max's stun shots misses the bad guy and accidentally hits the army guys who have shown up at the scene. Their intention is not clear yet, but they start firing on Max after one of them yells "shots fired". After Max destroys a few tanks and helicopters, Colonel Castel shows up and orders his people to stop. He acknowledges the whole thing was a misunderstanding and invites Max and Steel back to his base with him. Castel reveals to Max that he knows about N-TEK, himself, and about Dredd. The Colonel invites Max to join him and says, with his Intel and Max's power they could accomplish much together. Max goes back to N-TEK and tells about his meeting with Castle to Kat, Jefferson, and Forge. They discourage him from any future visits with Castel and the Army. Naught and an army of robots start destroying downtown for no apparent reason. Max and N-TEK show up on the scene but the Army has already captured Naught and squelched the violence. Forge demands to take custody of Naught and Max tried to calm both him and the Colonel down. Forge backs off after the Colonel asks if Max knows about N-Tek's true mission. Back at the N-Tek, Max tries to get the truth out of Forge, but is unsuccessfully, and goes away hurt and angry. The Colonel calls Max and says he now knows the location of Dredd and invites Max to join him in taking him down. Max shows up and finds that the whole thing was a trap to capture him. N-Tek eventually shows up and saves Max & Steel. Steel is still thirsting for knowledge about his past and the episode ends with him looking at the captured Earth Elementor.
13	13	"Elements of Surprise"	Logan McPherson & Trent Carlson	Matthew Drdek	August 17, 2013	N/A
14	14	"Elements of Surprise"	Daniel Ife	Matthew Drdek	August 24, 2013	N/A
Part 1: Desperate for answers, Steel goes sneaking off and ends up trying to get answers out of the 3 captured Elementors about who he is and where he comes from. Meanwhile, Dredd tells the Air Elementor the secret location of N-Tek. He shows up and knocks N-Tek and Max around as a distraction, before Max finally subdues him. After a heated argument, Forge gets mad at Steel and orders Jefferson to throw him in the brig, but is interrupted by sirens & warning lights in the base. Air Elementor breaks out and then releases the Fire, Earth, and Water Elementors. Through an accident, all four of them merge into one being, becoming Ultimate Elementor. Part 2: Ultimate Elementor escapes N-Tek and brings the captured Commander Forge to Dredd. Elementor has a hard time controlling his body, as each Elementor fights for control. Dredd is able to get the location of some kind of device hidden at a Dam near N-Tek and sends Ultimate Elementor there to destroy it. Steel creates a new Speed Mode for Max and together they are able to hold off Elementor. Meanwhile, Forge escapes from Dredd's compound and hooks up with Kat, Jefferson, and Berto. Max Steel and Elementor battle it out in the Dam and Max Steel defeats him, but he escapes. The episode closes with Steel disclosing to Max that he may finally have all the pieces to N-Tek's secret agenda.
15	15	"Driven"	Logan McPherson & Gino Nichele	Rich Fogel	August 31, 2013	N/A
Extroyer's henchmen steal a package from a science lab and then park their car in a place where they sell preowned cars by accident. The next morning Max and Kirby buy the car and Extroyer's Henchmen start searching for the car. Berto turns the car into a Turbo Car and Extroyer's Henchmen kidnaps Sydney. Max follows them while the old man that was checking how well Max can drive fell asleep. Max and Steel get Ultra-Linked and then they enter Extroyer's secret hideout and then Extroyer knocks Max Steel out. Extroyer demands the package or, they will kill Sydney. Max gives the package to Extroyer and finds to their shock that it doesn't just carry the DNA of the most dangerous and ferocious animals on Earth. He morphs into a black cobra and fights with Max Steel. Steel takes Sydney to a police station by using the auto GPS in the Turbo Car. Then Extroyer turns back to normal and when he was going to morph into a deadly saber tooth tiger, Steel drove over him and all the animal DNA fell on him and he morphed into them all and then he turned big but failed to morph correctly which turns him back into his appearance as a deformed spiky creature with goop coming out of his body. Max, Steel, and Extroyer's henchmen ditch him. Afterward, Max earns his driver's license and he and Steel go on a drive, while Extroyer's henchmen drove off to Las Vegas.
16	16	"The Truth Hurts"	Logan McPherson & Jeremy Brown	Matthew Drdek	September 21, 2013	0.34
Sydney Gardner finally finds out that Maxwell McGrath is actually Max Steel. Then she goes on an adventure with Max, which is interrupted by Ultimate Elementor who wants to defeat Max Steel and combine him into his body using a TURBO Ray he stole from Dredd. Sydney decides to go rescue Max. Max Steel fights Elementor and quickly loses to him until Sydney intervenes between them, losing her current memories about Max Steel's secret identity. After retreating, Elementor realizes that Dredd had placed fake schematics in his system, realizing that Dredd does not trust them as much as they trust him..
17	17	"The Secret Admirer"	Logan McPherson & Trent Carlson	Matthew Drdek	September 28, 2013	0.51
Molly receives roses from a secret admirer, which angers Max. Meanwhile, a strange virus begins to infect Copper Canyon citizens. Max does some digging and discovers that Toxzon is behind it all and that Molly, Max's mom, is the prime target because she was the one who fired him from his job at THI.
18	18	"Scrambled"	Logan McPherson & Daniel Ife	Rich Fogel	October 5, 2013	0.46
Attempting to learn more of his past, Steel tracks down Extroyer, since he has an Ultra-Link embedded in his body. But when he leaves Max to investigate him, Extroyer's damaged Ultra-Link scrambles his system and makes him malfunction in all sorts of funny ways. Meanwhile, Extroyer has a hard time morphing and goes to THI to fix his problem. While unsuccessful, he demands that Max get him a device to repair his system or he'll kill Molly. After repairing himself, Extroyer morphs into a giant gorilla and fights Max. However, Steel arrives and unveils a new TURBO Stealth Mode which helps them defeat Extroyer, but he escapes. Steel then talks to Max about the memories he received after being scrambled and reveals there used to be another Max Steel before him.
19	19	"X Marks the Spot"	Logan McPherson & Jeremy Brown	Matthew Drdek	October 12, 2013	0.34
Max and Steel are on a road trip in the search for N-Tek's true mission, but instead, they find Dredd and Jason Naught who are looking for a transmitter that will show them all of N-Tek's network of transmitters. After a fierce battle, N-Tek arrives and defeats Dredd but he escapes with Naught. Forge reveals to Max that there are hundreds of transmitters across the world and since he only had half of the device he only received part of the information.
20	20	"Gone Fishin'"	Logan McPherson & Gino Nichele	Brian Soika	October 19, 2013	0.37
Max Steel and N-Tek are investigating an ocean-wide radioactive contamination when piranha mutated by the radiation attack them. The heroes defeat them, only for a giant piranha to chase after Max. Max is then rescued by a radiation-powered Toxzon, who has survived his defeat in ″The Secret Admirer″ and wants his plastic pet, Fishy back, warning him that he'll poison every ocean on Earth if not. After N-Tek attempts to make a copy of Fishy, Toxzon discovers the ruse and angrily attacks N-Tek and Max with his new Radioactive Goopaniods. Forge arrives in the nick of time with Fishy just as Max, Steel, Jefferson, Kat, and C.Y.T.R.O. are cornered. With Fishy returned to him, Toxzon holds his end of the bargain and absorbs all of the waste, returning the world's oceans to normal and making him even more powerful. Fishy advises the super-powerful Toxzon to attack Max and N-Tek. Toxzon imprisons Max Steel in a ball of radioactive waste, then throws him into the ocean, and defeats Forge, C.Y.T.R.O, Kat, and Jefferson. Then on his way to Copper Canyon to destroy it, Max flies out of the ocean and traps Toxzon in a reinforced waste silo. Wanting to keep a closer eye on Toxzon, N-Tek locks him up in the Chemi-Vault.
21	21	"Making the Grade"	Logan McPherson & Trent Carlson	Matthew Drdek	October 26, 2013	0.34
Due to his superhero duties, Max has been failing school. His teacher, while rummaging through his bag in search of his science project, stumbles upon Steel. Initially planning to get Steel back, Max realizes that the accidental deception is his only hope of a passing grade, passing with flying colors when the teacher is led to believe it's an electronic shoe warmer. The next day Extroyer learns of the Ultra-Link on display at the school and buys it, inspired by their last encounter, Extroyer has created a device to unleash all of his powers at once. Max calls in N-Tek to help stage a rescue mission and faces off against a monstrous chimeric fusion of Extroyer with all of his animal forms. After narrowly retrieving Steel in time Max is able to force Extroyer to surrender, escaping at the last moment by setting the adapter to self-destruct. Back at school, Max decides to make an honest attempt at a science project, while not looking as impressive as Steel the teacher decides to pass Max anyway.
22	22	"Split Decisions"	Logan McPherson & Daniel Ife	Matthew Drdek	November 2, 2013	0.36
When the Elementors can't stop arguing with themselves, they settle their differences by splitting up and hunting for Max Steel. Meanwhile, Steel hypnotizes Berto so he and Max can gain information about N-Tek's top-secret files, but they later find out he doesn't have any secrets. During his fight with the four Elementors, Max Steel uses a new Turbo Cannon Mode to defeat them, causing them to retreat. Steel then apologizes to Berto, who regained his conscience. Back to Dredd's base, the Elementors agree to fuse themselves together into Ultimate Elementor once again due to the fact their hatred for Max Steel has increased more while they're separated.
23	23	"Pick Your Poison"	Logan McPherson & Jeremy Brown	Matthew Drdek	November 9, 2013	0.40
With the Elementors finally working as one, Max Steel has been beaten by Ultimate Elementor for weeks. Outmatched, N-Tek decides that they need assistance taking down Elementor, so they enlist a very unlikely ally- Toxzon, having need of his twisted genius to defeat the monster. Toxzon agrees and helps create a toxic formula to neutralize the Elementor's powers, but soon reveals it is actually a serum to mind-control Elementor. Max Steel creates a brand new mode; TURBO Clone Mode to defeat them. The serum wears off, and Elementor breaks free from Toxzon's control and pursues after him, angry for using him like a pet. In the end, N-Tek uses Toxzon's formula to upgrade their weapons.
24	24	"Thanks, I Think"	Logan McPherson & Tom Galvin	Matthew Drdek	November 16, 2013	0.50
Max Steel battles Extroyer at a museum with his new TURBO Modes. Extroyer escapes with a stone containing the DNA of a prehistoric dinosaur and extroys into a Tyrannosaurus Rex. Extroyer comes after Max Steel (aka Kirby and Sydney in disguise to thank the hero for all he has done for them) and discovers that he is not Max. The real Max Steel arrives and tries to defeat Extroyer, but cannot beat him in this animal form. Sydney uses a knockout gas grenade to put Extroyer to sleep and N-Tek later arrests him. In the end, Max tells Kirby and Sydney that they have shown Max Steel enough gratitude.
25	25	"Earth Under Siege"	Logan McPherson & Michael Dowding	Matthew Drdek	December 7, 2013	0.39
26	26	"Earth Under Siege"	Daniel Ife	Matthew Drdek	December 7, 2013	0.39
Part 1: Dredd creates a powerful weapon that will disable N-Tek's shield over the earth making it vulnerable to the Makino Invasion. Meanwhile, Ferrus and Molly finally tell Max and Steel the whole truth about his father and how he became a hero so he could help N-Tek stop the other Evil Ultra-Links from destroying earth so their leader can devour it. In the end, the rockets Miles Dredd planned to launch on the N-Tek transmitters get destroyed, but they find out that Dredd planned it so he could use Max's own TURBO Energy against them so his ally, the Makino, could eliminate Earth. Part 2: During their attack on Planet Earth; Ferrus explains to Max Steel the upcoming Ultra-Link Invasion and their home leader, Makino. He says there will be more ships coming and that the attack they did was just the beginning, there will be more aliens and beings from outer space who will come and try to invade Earth and prepare for the Invasion. N-Tek and Max Steel fight the Makino ship and some Evil Ultra-Links and Elementor. As they enter the Makino Starship (thanks to Steel since he is Makino tech), Forge tells Max and Steel that Max's father bonded with Steel and became the other Max Steel they saw in space and that he kept the truth from them because he didn't know if Steel would turn back to serving Makino. They board the Makino ship and infiltrate the ship's TURBO Energy Absorbing Chamber, but encounter Dredd, who has now upgraded his armor. After beating both Max and Forge senseless, Dredd offers Steel to rejoin the Makino Empire. Steel tricks Dredd, and changes into TURBO Cannon Mode to knock him into the Chamber. Dredd's Evil TURBO Energy causes the generator to implode as Forge and Max Steel escape while the Makino Spaceship gets destroyed. On the way out, Forge tries to apologize to Steel, but then an Ultralinked creature dives for Max Steel attempting to eat them. Forge pushes them out of the way, costing him his arm. N-Tek defeats Elementor and Berto gives Forge a robotic arm. Meanwhile, Dredd tells Makino that they lost the fight, but Makino is not disappointed because there will be more and not even N-Tek can anticipate it.

=== Season 2 (2014) ===
No. overall	No. in season	Title	Directed by	Written by	Original release date
27	1	"Ultralink Invasion"	Jeremy Brown	Matthew Drdek	August 15, 2014
28	2	"Ultralink Invasion"	Gino Nichele; Sean Sullivan	Matthew Drdek	August 15, 2014
Part 1: While Max Steel and N-Tek are expecting an invasion by Dredd and Makino's forces, a mysterious warrior arrives and is on the hunt for Steel. Part 2: Max must fight Makino's Ultralinks and at the same time rescue Steel from Ven Ghan, before his TURBO energy goes out of control.
29	3	"Dredd Ascendant"	Trent Carlson	Sean Jara	August 15, 2014
Dredd orchestrates a full scale attack on N-Tek, when they shut down their mainframe. Meanwhile, Max has a dream about his father, Jim McGrath.
30	4	"Toxic Relationship"	Daniel Ife	Sean Jara	August 15, 2014
An Ultralink bonds with Fishy and Toxzon is not happy about it.
31	5	"Full Metal Racket"	Ben Anderson	Sean Jara	August 15, 2014
Max, Sydney and Kirby plan their participation in a concert, but they become targets when the new, powerful Metal Elementor comes for Max Steel.
32	6	"Animal Attraction"	Sean Sullivan	Marty Isenberg	August 15, 2014
Steel feels responsible enough to have a pet, so Berto gives him a robotic dog named Furbo. Meanwhile, Extroyer is on the hunt for an alien creature in order to become more powerful than ever.
33	7	"Deep Turbo Blue Sea"	Trent Carlson	Grant Sauvé	August 15, 2014
Dredd decodes the location of the first piece of the Turbo Star, but it's near an N-Tek base.
34	8	"The Ultralink Hunter"	Daniel Ife	Steve Sullivan	August 15, 2014
When Elementor captures Steel and Ven Ghan, the Ultralink and the hunter must work together to escape, while Max is stuck in Super Mode. As punishment for his previous failures, Metallack absorbs Ultimate Elementor to become Mega Elementor.
35	9	"Digital Meltdown"	Ben Anderson	Brian Soika	August 15, 2014
Toxzon uses a popular video game about Max Steel to locate him through his voice. Things get worse when he uses the Ultralink Avatak too.
36	10	"Journey to the Center of Copper Canyon"	Jeremy Brown	Grant Sauvé	September 5, 2014
Max and Dredd race to recover the second piece of the Turbo Star in the ancient abandoned mines of Copper Canyon haunted by the copper squatch.
37	11	"Hot Zone"	Trent Carlson	Michael Ryan	September 5, 2014
Mega Elementor launches the perfect attack on Max Steel while he's on vacation on a tropical South Pacific island. Through inadvertent coincidences, Sydney and Kirby are led to believe Berto is Max Steel.
38	12	"Lights!, Camera!, Max!"	Andrew Doucette & Robin Shea	Sean Jara	September 5, 2014
Max gets sucked into the director's cut when a movie is made about Max Steel, but Kirby steps in for the role of Max.
39	13	"Legend of Ja'em Mk'rah"	Ben Anderson	Michael Ryan & Sean Jara	September 5, 2014
Blast Link infects Steel with a virus, causing Max and Steel to get caught in a memory spiral and to experience Steel's past as if they were really there,.
40	14	"Makino Strikes"	Jeremy Brown	Thomas Krajewski	September 5, 2014
41	15	"Makino Strikes"	Trent Carlson & Robin Shea	Thomas Krajewski	September 5, 2014
Part 1: N-Tek is under attack by Dredd and Makino's forces, with an Ultralink having taken control of Forge. Meanwhile, Makino himself takes on Max Steel. Part 2: N-Tek's forces try to defend THI from the evil Ultralinks, while Max and Ven Ghan attempt to rescue Steel, who is Makino's captive, while at the same time discovering Max's true heritage of being a half alien. He and Steel go into Steel's memory core where they talk to Ja'em M'krah who left a message for Max. Then he unlocks a new mode: Rocket Mode, and defeats Makino with it.
42	16	"Got Turbo Star"	Andrew Doucette	Benjamin Townsend	September 5, 2014
Makino recreates himself and is coming back to Earth with the Alpha link to destroy it. Meanwhile Max and Dredd go after the last piece of the Turbo Star.
43	17	"My Best Friend is an Ultralink"	Ben Anderson	Mark Hoffmeier	November 2, 2014 (Australia)
Three evil Ultralinks possess Sydney, Kirby and Butch. Max has to find a way to free his friends, but while he doesn't want to hurt them, they definitely don't feel the same way.
44	18	"Me, Myself and Extroyer"	Jeremy Brown	Benjamin Townsend	November 8, 2014 (Australia)
During a battle with Max Steel, Extroyer manages to extroy him, creating a Max Steel doppelganger.
45	19	"Definitely Fear the Reaper"	Robin Shea	Thomas Krajewski	November 9, 2014 (Australia)
Halloween night and Max is locked in a museum with the rest of his class. But when they accidentally stumble upon a meteor that is a chunk of Takion they alert Mega Elementor to its existence.
46	20	"Torbolt the Terrible"	Andrew Daucette	Mark Hoffmeier	December 16, 2014 (Australia)
An Ultralink deserter named Torbolt, who is struggling to break free of his malevolent programming, creates major problems for Max and Steel.
47	21	"Reprogrammed"	Ben Anderson	Michael Ryan	November 16, 2014 (Australia)
Because of Mega Elementor, Max and Steel end up in each other's bodies.
48	22	"A Germ of an Idea"	Jeremy Brown	Benjamin Townsend	November 23, 2014 (Australia)
With Makino getting stronger as he approaches closer to Earth, Forge pushes forward with the construction of a space station designed to defend the planet. However, when the station is jeopardized by a dangerous computer virus, Max Steel must find a way to save it before it crashes to Earth with everyone on board, including Max's mother. Unfortunately, the only one who knows how to clear the virus: is Toxzon.
49	23	"Fugitives"	Robin Shea	Rich Fogel	November 23, 2014 (Australia)
Still desiring justice for Steel's past crimes, the Black Star Council sends a deadly bounty hunter to find and capture Steel, as well as Ven-Ghan for helping him.
50	24	"The Great Turbo Star Caper"	Andrew Doucette	Thomas Krajewski	November 30, 2014 (Australia)
Max Steel wants to use the Turbo Star to defeat Makino, whereas Dredd needs Max's Turbo energy to power the Star. While Dredd succeeds in capturing Max Steel, a surprising turn of events leads to one last confrontation between the two rivals.
51	25	"The Final Countdown"	Ben Anderson	Thomas Krajewski	November 30, 2014 (Australia)
52	26	"The Final Countdown"	Jeremy Brown	Thomas Krajewski	December 6, 2014 (Australia)
Part 1: Makino finally arrives and a full-scale battle ensues. During a fight with Mega Elementor, Max Steel turns the tide when he unlocks a brand-new ability. Part 2: Max Steel and Makino clash head-on in a fight that will determine the fate of the Earth once and for all. It is revealed that Max's father, Jim McGrath, is alive.

=== Films (2015–17) ===
No.	Title	Directed by	Written by	Original release date
1	"The Wrath of Makino"	Jeremy Brown & Barry Karnowski	Matthew Drdek, Rob David & Lloyd Goldfine	June 27, 2015 (Latin America)
Makino is dead, but his helmet remains intact and is looking for someone worthy of its power. This leads to Max Steel having to fight with other Ultralinks so that the helmet stays out of their hands.
2	"Dawn of Morphos"	Andrew Doucette & Ben Anderson	Matthew Drdek	June 27, 2015 (Latin America)
Miles Dredd revives an old project of his, a monster named Morphos, which escapes from N-Tek. Max Steel must deal with this problem before it destroys Copper Canyon. In the process, Max learns how to combine more than one Turbo mode.
3	"Maximum Morphos"	Andrew Doucette, Ben Anderson & Barry Karnowski	Matthew Drdek	August 2, 2015 (Latin America)
Morphos has returned and is now stronger than ever! To prove he is the greatest villain of all, he begins to mimic powers of all the enemies of Max Steel, forcing Max to forge an alliance with his old enemies to defeat him.
4	"Team Turbo"	Sam Chou	Rob David & Rich Fogel	March 18, 2016 (Latin America)
After 2 years, Max will now have to become a leader: When new villain Mortum takes down N-Tek, Max and Steel will have to lead a team of turbofied heroes: Cytro, Tempestra and La Fiera! When Mortum recruits Toxzon, Extroyer and The Elementors to conquer Copper Canyon and seek the mysterious Connect-Tek, Max must stop them before they reach their goal!
5	"Team Turbo Fusion Tek"	Sam Chou	Rob David, Matt Drdek, Lloyd Goldfine & Eugene Son	August 31, 2016 (UK)
Mortum returns as a robot zombie, emerging from his grave to absorb the brainwaves of humanity. Now, Max and his Team Turbo will face their greatest challenge yet! Will they be able to defeat Mortum and save the world from the Technopocalypse!?
6	"Turbo Charged"	Lloyd Goldfine	Rob David, Lloyd Goldfine & Michael Ryan	March 18, 2017 (Latin America)
To prevent Lord Nexus' minion, Terrorax, from taking over the world alongside his technological super villain league, Max and his Team Turbo must control a completely new level of T.U.R.B.O. Energy never seen before. However, after Terrorax manages to create his own version of Max's energy named Terror Energy, his own team of twisted villains plans on permanently deactivating technology from humanity, Max and his team must act swiftly to stop them.
7	"Turbo Warriors"	Lloyd Goldfine	Rob David, Jacob Goldfine, Lloyd Goldfine & Michael Ryan	July 29, 2017 (Latin America)
Terrorax is back with his most powerful weapon: the Pantheon! Can Max take them down in time to save the city he's sworn to protect?
