= Vac-Man =

Action figure

Vac-Man is an action figure created as the nemesis of Stretch Armstrong. Vac-Man is suggested to be from a faraway galaxy. Vac-Man is the evil apprentice of the Vac-overlord, which was never released due to Hasbro purchasing Cap Toys in 1997.

Unlike the Stretch Action figures, which contained a syrup-like liquid inside a rubber sheath, Vac-Man (and associated models like the Vac-Pac, which were the heroic enemies of Vac-Man) contained a grainy solid, produced from ground-up corn cobs. By attaching the provided pump to a socket on Vac-Man's head, air could be sucked out until the body became rigid. It could then be stretched, but unlike Stretch Armstrong, it would retain its stretched shape until the air was let back in. Hasbro continued the production of Vac-Man in 2018, one year after continuing production of the Stretch action figures, which included Fetch Armstrong and the Stretch Octopus. A second variant of Vac-Man was created, this time half the size of the 2018 Vac-Man (14 inches). This smaller version could be pumped by pulling up on the head, then pushing down to make a built-in pump. Vac-Man was made by Cap Toys (later purchased by Hasbro) and designed by Bruce D. Lund, starting in 1994 and most likely discontinued in 1997.
