= Stretch Armstrong =

Action figure notable for its ability to stretch several feet

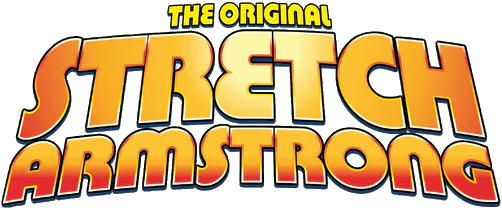
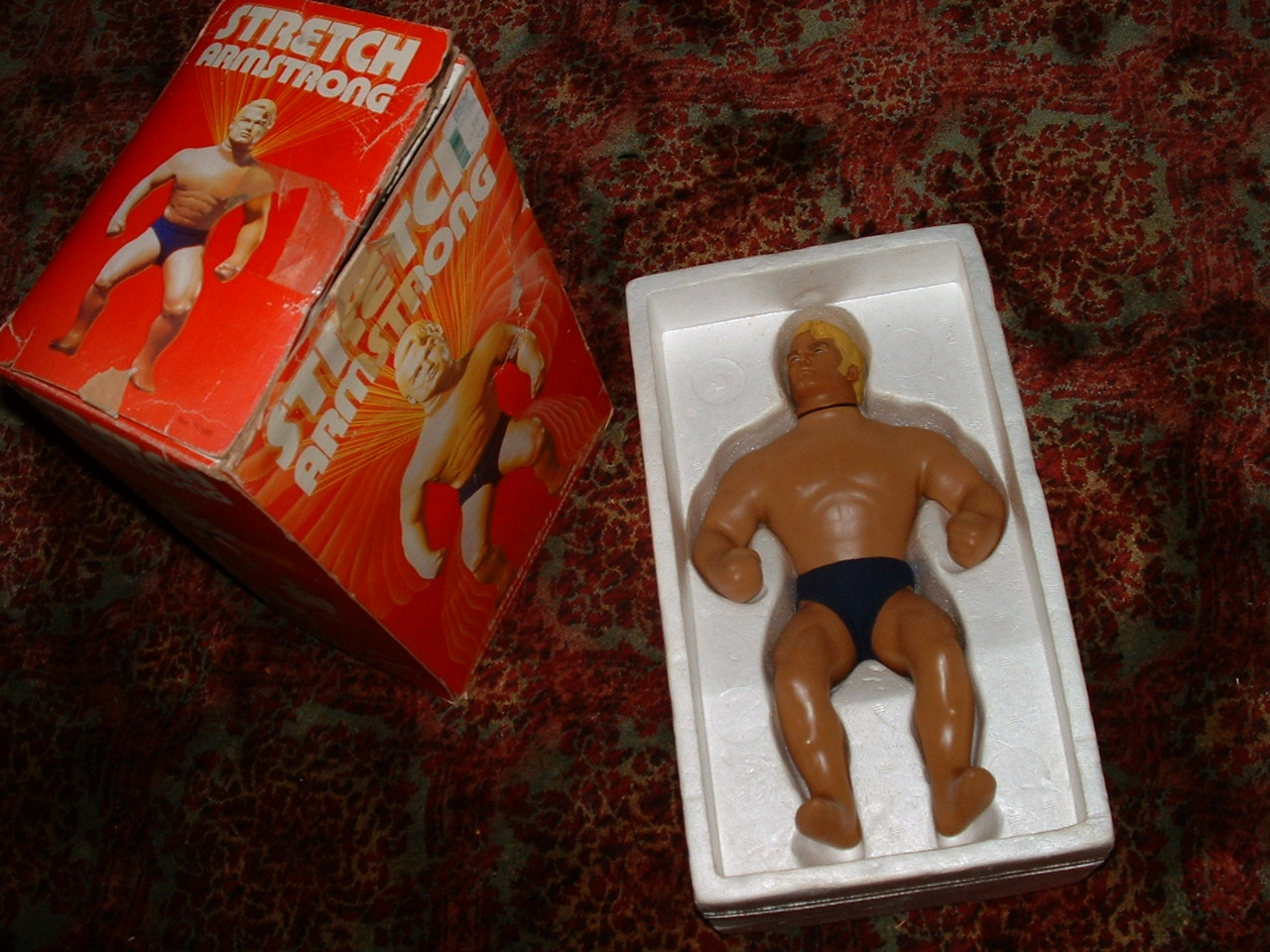
- Vintage figure and packaging
- Type: Action figure
- Invented by: Jesse D. Horowitz
- Company: Kenner (1976–80); Denys Fisher (in Europe); Hasbro (2016–present); Basic Fun! (2025-present)
- Country: United States
- Availability: 1976–1980, 2016–present
- Materials: Plastic, rubber and gel

Stretch Armstrong is a large, gel-filled action figure that was first sold in 1976 by Kenner.

It looks like a short muscular man with blond hair wearing black trunks, but can be stretched from its normal size of about 15 inches (38 cm) to four to five feet (120 to 150 cm).

The doll is made of latex rubber filled with a proprietary gelled substance similar to corn syrup, which allows it to retain shape for a short time before shrinking to its original shape. Tears can be fixed with an adhesive bandage, according to an instruction booklet included with the box.

In 2016, at the New York Toy Fair, Hasbro announced the return of the Stretch Armstrong toy in its original 1976 design.

In 2015, Hasbro gave the license for Stretch Armstrong to Character Options, which began releasing new products in 2016. In 2023, Character Options announced plans to expand the brand until 2024. The plans included launching the original toy under the name "The Original Stretch Armstrong" and creating a "Stretch" brand to create crossover products with brands such as Star Wars and Transformers.

In 2025, Basic Fun! acquired a license from Hasbro to manufacture and distribute products based on Stretch Armstrong and Vac-Man, including classic and reimagined versions of the characters, as well as partnering with other entertainment brands to launch new licensed products inspired by the Stretch Armstrong toy.

== History ==
The Stretch Armstrong toy concept was created by Jesse D. Horowitz, the industrial designer for Kenner's R&D group. The idea was approved for development by the head of R&D, Jeep (James) Kuhn, vice president of Kenner.

The "stretch man" idea as it was called was pursued with two different bodies in mind. One was a sumo wrestler and the other was an All-American blond hunk. Horowitz sculpted the models himself instead of hiring a freelancer. The sumo man was too bulky and large, so the All-American body was cast by Kenner's model maker Richard Dobek, and the resultant resin model was taken to a latex doll manufacturer in New Jersey, where the first bodies were dipped.

Originally, springs were thought of as the way to stretch the man. However, they were thought to be too awkward and stiff, too difficult to insert and would likely pierce the skin. Kuhn, a chemical engineer, pursued a liquid sugar idea which eventually proved successful. Tremendous quantities of Karo corn syrup were purchased from an A&P supermarket. The syrup was boiled down to get the proper viscosity. Kuhn and Horowitz flew to Kenner's headquarters in Cincinnati, Ohio, and presented the concept to Bernie Loomis, Kenner's president. He loved it and a toy icon was born.

The original Stretch Armstrong figure was conceived and developed by Bill Armasmith, and was in production from 1976 until 1980. Denys Fisher manufactured and released the figure in Europe, under license from Kenner. The original 1970s toy commands high prices on the secondary collectors' market, selling for hundreds, perhaps thousands, of US dollars. Through storage and play, the figure could become damaged and rendered useless. There are still original Stretch Armstrongs that have survived the passing of time and are remarkably preserved through sheer luck or being stored at the correct temperature. The figure keeps best at room temperature.

Stretch Armstrong is made of latex rubber filled with gelled corn syrup, which allows it to retain shape for a short time before shrinking to its original shape.

=== Similar releases ===
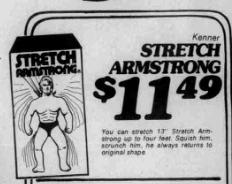
Stretch Armstrong ad

An estimated 67 different versions from Japan, Germany, Italy, France, Australia, and other countries released Stretch Armstrong variations between 1976 and the 1990s.

- Stretch X-Ray (1977), had an oversized exposed brain and an alien-looking face with a transparent form that showed its internal organs which were lungs, an intestinal system and what appears to be a heart. This version was re-released.
- Harbert Sport Mister Muscolo, 1977 Italian version of Stretch Armstrong
- Lili Ledy El Hombre Elastico, Mexican version of Stretch Armstrong
- Tsukuda Mr. X, Japanese version of Stretch Armstrong
- Stretch Monster, a reptilian green nemesis released by Kenner in 1978
- Harbert Sport Mister Mostro, Italian version of Stretch Monster
- Tsukuda Stretch Monster, Japanese version
- Stretch Ollie and Stretch Olivia, male and female octopuses (colored blue and pink, respectively) which had the same face shape but the only difference was their color. Kenner issued both weeks apart but Ollie was more popular. The Denys Fisher UK toy company issued Ollie and Olivia in smaller boxes than their American counterparts, saving on shelf space. The figures are rare to come by now.
- Denys Fisher Stretch Incredible Hulk (1979) This figure used the original Stretch Armstrong molds and graphics without permission, and was discontinued due to a lawsuit from Kenner in 1980.
- Mego Elastic Donald Duck (1980)
- Mego Elastic Mickey Mouse (1980)
- Mego Elastic Batman
- Mego Elastic Incredible Hulk (1979)
- Mego Elastic Plastic Man (1979)
- Kenner Stretch Serpent
- Cap Toys Fetch Armstrong, Stretch Armstrong's pliable Dachshund counterpart, released in the early 1990s
- Kenner/Hasbro Super Stretch Mask
- Cap Toys Stretch Vac-Man
- ToyQuest Super Morphman
- Super Impulse Gumby and Pokey Stretch

The last two were filled with a granular solid in place of the viscous liquid found in the other figures. A vacuum pump, which attached to the heads of these figures, removed the air from within, which "froze" the toy in its stretched position.

Stretch Armstrong was reissued in the 1990s by Cap Toys, with a Dachshund sidekick, "Fetch Armstrong". The reissue stretch Armstrong had a more comical exaggerated face (a huge genial smile) and had on a vanity T-shirt and shorts. This new reissue figure was introduced in 1993 and 1994 version exist with slightly different art work. He also has an evil brother named Evil X-ray Wretch Armstrong who has a skull face, sports a mohawk, and also stretches. Wretch Armstrong seems to be a redesigned, smaller remake of Stretch X-Ray but in reality looks nothing like the 1970s version. Evil X-ray Wretch Armstrong is only 7 inches tall whereas Stretch X-ray was over 12 inches tall.

== Adaptations ==
=== Cancelled film ===
In 1994, Walt Disney Studios obtained the film rights to the character, with Caravan Pictures producing. Several scripts were written, including an early version family comedy written by Greg Erb, a co-writer at Disney. The script which cast Tim Allen in the role of Stretch Armstrong as a "kind of single dad who is a research scientist" and is "stretched too thin" trying to balance his work and family life before he inadvertently accidentally takes one of his experimental serums giving himself "stretchy powers". A later version from screenwriter Michael Kalesniko was created and it was set in San Francisco. It was about a somewhat socially awkward nobody beset with troubles trying to venture out his failing personal life. He is then genetically modified with stretching abilities after a failed nuclear fusion experiment and must use his newfound abilities to solve the tragedy that has befallen his family. Among the actors who were considered for the role was Danny DeVito, who refused to do the film if the script made any jokes about his height. Several other writers, such as Mike Werb and Michael Colleary, provided rewrites, and Peter Care was attached to direct, but due to lack of time on the rights, both ideas from Disney were scrapped and the rights were bought up by Hasbro.

In 2008, Universal Studios signed a deal with Hasbro to create another film based on Stretch Armstrong from a screenplay written by Nicholas Stoller.

It was announced from the studios co-chairman Donna Langley that Taylor Lautner would star as Armstrong and that the film would be in 3-D. She stated that "with Lautner's success energy and athleticism he is a perfect fit to a unlikely hero." Producer Brian Grazer stated "Stretch Armstrong is a character I have wanted to see on screen for a long time ... It's a story about a guy stretching ... the limits of what is possible to become all that he can be." Another script was being made by writer Steve Oedekerk introducing the character in the form of an uptight spy who stumbles across a stretching formula, which he takes and now must adjust to his newfound abilities when fighting crime and in his everyday life.

Two years later, after the excitement drummed up by the Studios ideas for the character, Relativity Media announced that they had picked up the film after it was dropped by Universal and set a new release date of April 11, 2014. Planning to make the film more serious than originally intended by Universal, Relativity hired The Manchurian Candidate writer Dean Georgaris to write a new script, dropped Lautner, and hired Breck Eisner to direct. The film origin story was going to introduce an overwhelmed high schooler and the life-or-death consequences he was going to face after undergoing a transformation granting him superhuman abilities. Production was scheduled to start filming on May 15, 2013, in Montreal but by October 2013, both the studio and Hasbro had abandoned the film to work on other projects.

=== Television ===
After four attempted films for Stretch Armstrong, Hasbro Studios made a deal with the video streaming service website Netflix where the property was picked up for a full 26-episode animated series, making it the first deal between the company and the streaming service. This superhero action/comedy animated series followed a teenager named Jake Armstrong and his two best friends as they go into action after being exposed to an experimental chemical making them Stretch Armstrong and the Flex Fighters—a team of stretchable superheroes who must work together and embark on a series of adventures. The series debuted on Netflix on November 17, 2017.

The series was developed by Kevin Burke, Victor Cook, and Chris "Doc" Wyatt. Burke and Wyatt also wrote a tie-in comic book for IDW Publishing. The first 13 episodes of the 26-episode first season were released on Netflix on November 17, 2017.

=== Comics ===
A similar concept with Stretch as a superhero was also shown in a one-off comic produced by Hasbro in 2011 dubbed Unit:E; there, the descendant of Acroyear and a Biotron (both from Micronauts) and Synergy (from Jem; here an alien artificial intelligence) conducted reconnaissance on heroes from Earth and beyond (including characters from G.I. Joe, Transformers, MASK, Battleship Galaxies, Action Man, and even Candy Land) to help fight against Baron Karza (the enemy of the Micronauts).

In September 2017, IDW Publishing announced a new comic book based on the Netflix series Stretch Armstrong and the Flex Fighters for January 2018.

=== Video game ===
In 2018, an interactive special called Stretch Armstrong: The Breakout was released on Netflix. It is set in the universe of the Flex Fighters series and involves Jake Armstrong, Ricardo and Nathan stopping villains from rampaging through Charter City.
