= Tsukuda =

Tsukuda (written: 佃 lit. "cultivated rice field") is a Japanese surname. Notable people with the surname include:

- Kazuo Tsukuda (佃 和夫; born 1943), Japanese businessman
- Kensuke Tsukuda (佃 賢典; born 1977), Japanese footballer
- Sakie Tsukuda (佃 咲江; born 1985), Japanese cyclist

== See also ==
- Tsukuda Station (disambiguation), multiple train stations in Japan
