= Tsukuda Station =

Tsukuda Station is the name of two train stations in Japan:

- Tsukuda Station (Gunma) (津久田駅)
- Tsukuda Station (Tokushima) (佃駅)
