= Mattel Television =

Television arm of Mattel (2016–2025)

- Final logo, used from 2019 to 2025
- Formerly: Mattel Creations (2016–2019)
- Type: Division
- Industry: Television production
- Predecessors: Mattel Playground Productions; HIT Entertainment
- Founded: March 31, 2016; 10 years ago
- Defunct: June 2, 2025; 17 months ago
- Fate: Merged with Mattel Films to form Mattel Studios
- Successor: Mattel Studios
- Headquarters: Burbank, California, U.S.
- Area served: Worldwide
- Key people: Adam Bonnett (executive producer, division head); Frederic Soulie (general manager and senior vice president); Christopher Keenan (senior vice president for content development and production); Philip Breman (vice president, scripted and unscripted live-action series development); Josh Silverman
- Products: Television series; Television films; Miniseries
- Parent: Mattel

Mattel Television, alternatively known from 2023 to 2025 as Mattel Television Studios and formerly known as Mattel Creations, was an American television production company and the television division of American toy and entertainment company Mattel that operated from March 31, 2016 to June 2, 2025.

Originally formed as the successor to Mattel Playground Productions and HIT Entertainment, it was rebranded to its latest name with the hiring of former Disney Branded Television programming executive Adam Bonnett on February 5, 2019 and transitioned heavily towards the production of streaming media for release on YouTube variants and Netflix while maintaining the television forays of its previous incarnation.

On June 2, 2025, Mattel announced a merger, combination and consolidation of this division and its filming division, Mattel Films, into Mattel Studios, elevating and/or promoting Mattel Films head Robbie Brenner to/as head of Mattel Studios. This is seen as a revival of the brand/banner Mattel used occasionally or sparingly between 2011 and 2013 in place of their main logo in the end credits for media entries of Monster High, Ever After High and Polly Pocket.

== Background ==
Before the formation of Mattel Creations, Mattel signed a pact with DHX Media (now WildBrain) on December 16, 2015 to co-produce and co-distribute newer productions and episodes of existing television shows and web series based on Polly Pocket, Little People and HIT Entertainment brands Bob the Builder and Fireman Sam. At MIPCOM 2015, HIT Entertainment itself, through its owner Mattel, announced its last partnership in its existence with 9 Story Media Group to revive/reboot Barney & Friends and Angelina Ballerina for distribution in 2017, but nothing was disclosed of in terms of green-lighting them since then.

== History ==
Logo as Mattel Creations used from 2016 to 2019

Mattel formed a division called Mattel Creations on March 31, 2016, seeking to unify, centralize and revamp its entertainment business; it absorbed its main entertainment division at the time, Mattel Playground Productions, HIT Entertainment and the American Girl creative team in Middleton, Wisconsin on its launch. Mattel then appointed its then-chief content officer, Catherine Balsam-Schwaber, as its head and had HIT Entertainment president Christopher Keenan elevated or promoted to being its senior vice president overseeing development and production of productions from the division.

Mattel Creations signed an exclusive 7-year global subscription video on demand (SVOD) rights agreement with Universal Pictures Home Entertainment for the Barbie film library on October 16, 2016, including the two films released at the time; Barbie: Star Light Adventure and Barbie: Video Game Hero.

Catherine stepped down from her position and left Mattel on February 12, 2018 to take over as general manager of Craftsy, with Mattel's co-president and chief operating officer, Richard L. Dickson, adding the oversight of the division to his roles.

Mattel hired former Disney Branded Television programming executive Adam Bonnett as executive producer and head of a reorganized Mattel Television on February 5, 2019, which effectively replaced Mattel Creations. A week later, Mattel Television announced a proposition of twenty-two animated and live-action television programs. Former Saban Brands executive, Frederic Soulie, who was appointed as the senior vice president for content distribution and business development of the franchise management group division set up by Dickson and Ynon Kreiz, chairman and CEO of Mattel, to expand the company's entertainment business, was named senior vice president and general manager of Mattel Television.

On February 23, 2021, Mattel Television announced the return of the Monster High brand three years after its last production with an animated series and a live-action musical film, both of which aired on Nickelodeon and Paramount+ in the United States on October 6, 2022. On August 30, 2021, with the Universal deal expired, Mattel struck a deal with local home video releasing powerhouses, Mill Creek Entertainment and NCircle Entertainment, for the newer Netflix-based content for DVD, Blu-ray and Digital HD distribution to the U.S. and Canadian markets.

On September 7, 2021, following the debut of the streaming television film Barbie: Big City, Big Dreams on Netflix, Mattel hired former NBCUniversal vice president of current programming, Philip "Phil" Breman, to be the vice president overseeing live-action scripted and unscripted series development. Following its global popularity and success, Mattel Television unveiled a 26-episode animated streaming television musical serial adaptation and continuation of the film on February 1, 2022 known as Barbie: It Takes Two. The first half of episodes were released on Netflix in the U.S. on April 8, 2022 with the other half on October 1, with availability in other countries and territories reached 3 months after the American release. The series also aired on television in Australia, the UK and Ireland, Canada and Portugal.

On October 21, 2022, Mattel announced an agreement extension with Netflix that would make available the pre-2017 film catalogue previously held by Universal Pictures occasionally through the streaming service and the inaugural interactive "special" in the Barbie media franchise, Barbie: Epic Road Trip, which released 4 days later. On October 25, 2022, Mattel capitalized on the audiovisual revival of Monster High by jointly announcing a sequel to the live-action film with Nickelodeon and Paramount+, which began production began the following year on February 7 and premiered on October 5, 2023.

On February 16, 2023, Mattel published through Google Drive its content slate portfolio for the 2023–24 and 2024–25 fiscal years, including a revival of Fireman Sam and a makeover revival of Barney. On March 7, 2023, NBC green-lighted a car makeover competition featuring Hot Wheels called Hot Wheels: Ultimate Challenge.

On September 28, 2023, Netflix announced Hot Wheels Let's Race, the latest animated serial adaptation of Hot Wheels which premiered on March 4 the following year. On November 16, 2023, Michelle Mendelovitz was hired to head the division.

In August 2024, Mattel Television Studios announced that Hot Wheels: Let's Race! was renewed for a second season. The second season premiered in 9 September 2024.

On October 21, 2024, Mattel Television Studios announced that it would co-develop another television series in the Pingu franchise with Aardman Animations.

On June 2, 2025, Mattel announced a merger, combination and consolidation of this division and its filming division, Mattel Films, into Mattel Studios, elevating and/or promoting Mattel Films head Robbie Brenner to/as head of Mattel Studios. This is seen as a revival of the brand/banner Mattel used occasionally or sparingly between 2011 and 2013 in place of their main logo in the end credits for media entries of Monster High, Ever After High and Polly Pocket. Consequently, productions previously announced and in development with these two banners/divisions will now be assumed by/transferred to Mattel Studios.

== Filmography ==
As Mattel Creations
Title	Release date(s)	Type	Co-producer	Distributor(s)	Notes
Thomas & Friends: The Great Race	May 21, 2016 (UK; theatrical); September 2016 (DVD); Early 2017 (TV)	Animated film	Arc Productions	National Amusements (UK; theatrical); Multiple (TV)	
Barbie: Star Light Adventure	July 30, 2016 (Fathom Events); August 29, 2016 (Home video release)	CGI-animated film	Arc Productions	Fathom Events (U.S.; limited theatrical release); Universal Pictures Home Entertainment (Home video release)	Final production of Arc Productions before payroll glitch-turned-bankruptcy and re-opening as Jam Filled Entertainment's Toronto division/branch
Barbie Dreamtopia	January 10, 2016 – April 1, 2018 (original); July 21 – October 21, 2021 (as a Barbie Return to Dreamtopia segment of Barbie's Dreamworld)	CGI-animated web series	Snowball Studios (original); Relish Studios (Barbie Return to Dreamtopia)	YouTube Kids (YouTube); Cartoon Network (Latin America); Super RTL (Germany); Pop (UK and Ireland); MiniMini+ (Poland); TET (Ukraine); Carousel (Russia)	Began with a teaser promo video released on YouTube on 14 January, followed by 4 3-minute shorts also released on YouTube between 5 May to 21 July and then a 46-minute television special released by Universal on 16 June, all in 2016, which was broadcast on television in 5 countries and regions. The positive reception obtained resulted in the green-lighting of a web special released on 4 May 2017 called "Festival of Fun" and a 26-episode web series, which was released from 5 November 2017 to 1 April 2018, both on YouTube and YouTube Kids. The former would be re-released in 3 pieces as part the first batch of the latter. Ireland-based Relish Studios produced a web mini-series spin-off of the franchise titled Barbie Return to Dreamtopia as part of a broader animated web series franchise known as Barbie's Dreamworld which was released between 21 July and 21 October 2021.
Monster High: Great Scarrier Reef	June 23, 2016	Animated film	DHX Media Vancouver	Cartoon Network (Latin America); Nickelodeon (United States; worldwide); Universal Pictures Home Entertainment (home video formats)	61 minutes
WellieWishers	September 8, 2016	Animated series	Submarine Studios	Amazon Prime Video (U.S.); Tiny Pop (UK)	2 seasons, 26 episodes; American Girl doll franchise
Barbie & Her Sisters in A Puppy Chase	October 18, 2016	CGI-animated film	Rainmaker Entertainment	Nickelodeon (U.S. broadcast); Universal Pictures Home Entertainment (Home video release; international)	Pre-production was done by Arc Productions before its closure. The film was brought over to Rainmaker Entertainment for completion.
Barbie: Video Game Hero	January 31, 2017	CGI-animated film	Rainmaker Entertainment	Nickelodeon (U.S. broadcast); Universal Pictures Home Entertainment (Home video release; international)	Last Barbie film to be shown on either Nickelodeon or other/another children's television network(s) in the United States
Monster High: Electrified	February 12, 2017	CGI-animated film	Flaunt Studios	Cartoon Network (Latin America); Nickelodeon (United States; worldwide); Universal Pictures Home Entertainment (Home video formats)	64 minutes
The Toy Box	April 7, 2017 – November 19, 2017	Reality series	Hudsun Media; Electus	ABC (U.S. broadcast); Electus International	2 seasons
Monster High: Adventures of the Ghoul Squad	August 11, 2017 – February 9, 2018	Animated web series		YouTube	12 11-minute episodes
Barbie Dolphin Magic	September 18, 2017	CGI-animated film	Rainmaker Entertainment	Television: YTV (Canada); Pop (UK and Ireland); Streaming: Netflix (U.S., International)	Only Netflix-exclusive Barbie film to be released on home video (DVD and Digital HD) and video on demand by Universal.
Thomas & Friends	September 18, 2017 – January 20, 2021	Animated series	Jam Filled Entertainment	Channel 5; Netflix (season 24)	Continued from The Britt Allcroft Company/Gullane Entertainment and HIT Entertainment
Pingu in the City	October 7, 2017 – March 30, 2019	Animated series	Sony Creative Products; Polygon Pictures	NHK Educational TV	2 seasons
Minecraft Mini Series	October 26, 2017 – May 10, 2018	Animated series	Mojang Studios; Microsoft Studios; Atomic Cartoons	YouTube	2 seasons
Fireman Sam	November 18, 2017 – May 30, 2025	Animated series	Island of Misfits (series 11–12); WildBrain Studios (series 12–16)	Cartoonito UK & Ireland; Channel 5	3 seasons, 10 previous seasons; Distributed by WildBrain
Barbie Dreamhouse Adventures (Note: Used Mattel Creations for seasons 1 and 2 and Mattel Television thereafter.)	May 3, 2018 – April 12, 2020	CGI-animated streaming television series	Mainframe Studios	Netflix (U.S., International); Television: YTV (Canada); 9Go! (Australia); Canal Panda (Portugal)	5 seasons, 52 episodes
Polly Pocket	July 8, 2018 – October 19, 2025	Animated series	WildBrain Studios	Family Channel (season 1); Universal Kids (seasons 1 and 2); Netflix (seasons 2–5); Amazon Prime Video (season 6)	
As Mattel Television
Barbie: Princess Adventure	September 1, 2020	CGI-animated streaming television film	Mainframe Studios	Netflix	
Barbie & Chelsea: The Lost Birthday	April 16, 2021	CGI-animated streaming television film	Mainframe Studios	Netflix	Inaugural film to star Chelsea Roberts in a lead role since Barbie: Dreamtopia
Masters of the Universe: Revelation	July 23, 2021 – November 23, 2021	Animated streaming television series	Powerhouse Animation Studios	Netflix	2-part animated series
Barbie: Big City, Big Dreams	August 20, 2021 (UK); September 1, 2021 (U.S., International)	CGI-animated streaming television film	Mainframe Studios	Netflix	Inaugural Barbie-branded production starring Barbie Roberts from Malibu and a darker-skinned Barbie Roberts from Brooklyn, New York City in Mattel's statement push to showcase absolute diversity within future productions in its media franchise. It was given a limited theatrical release in the British Isles on 20 August 2021 before the American Netflix debut.
Thomas & Friends: All Engines Go	September 13, 2021 – September 11, 2025	Animated television series	Nelvana	Cartoon Network (U.S.); Treehouse TV (Canada)	Reboot of Thomas & Friends
He-Man and the Masters of the Universe	September 16, 2021 – August 18, 2022	CGI-animated streaming television series	House of Cool; CGCG, Inc.	Netflix	Re-imagining of the original 1983 TV series produced by Filmation.
Barbie: It Takes Two	March 4, 2022 (Television debut; Australia via 9Go!); April 8, 2022 – 2023 (American Netflix debut)	CGI-animated streaming television series	Mainframe Studios	Television: 9Go! (Australia); Pop (UK and Ireland); YTV (Canada); Canal Panda (Portugal); Streaming: Netflix (U.S., International)	Unveiled on 1 February 2022, via the Mattel website. Television adaptation of Barbie: Big City, Big Dreams. First aired on television in Australia on 4 March and in the United Kingdom and Ireland on 2 April before launching on Netflix in the U.S. on 8 April. Also aired on television in Canada on 10 April and in Portugal on 17 April. The first half of the episodes was released on 8 April and the other half on 1 October.
Deepa & Anoop	August 15, 2022 – November 7, 2022	Animated musical streaming television series	Kickstart Entertainment	Netflix	The inaugural television show based on original homegrown intellectual property. Created by Bollywood animator Munjal Shroff, written by Lisa Goldman and produced by Heather Kenyon, the show follows the adventures of a 7-year-old girl named Deepa, voiced by Pavan Bharaj, and her friend, a color-changing baby elephant named Anoop. 2 seasons.
Barbie: Mermaid Power	September 1, 2022	CGI-animated streaming television film	Mainframe Studios	Netflix (U.S., International); 9Go! (Australia); YTV (Canada)	This film was also shown in theaters across Europe and the Middle East between September and October 2022. Second television film and third production overall to feature two girls named "Barbie Roberts". Perceived among fans as the sequel to Barbie Dolphin Magic.
Pictionary	September 12, 2022 – May 30, 2025	Game show	Fox First Run; Bill's Market and Television Production; CBS Media Ventures	Syndication	
Monster High: The Movie	October 6, 2022	Live-action musical film	Brightlight Pictures; Nickelodeon Productions	Nickelodeon (U.S., television); Paramount+ (streaming)	Both were announced on 23 February 2021.
Monster High	October 6, 2022 – October 24, 2024	Animated television series	Nickelodeon Animation Studio	Nickelodeon	Both were announced on 23 February 2021.
Barbie: Epic Road Trip	October 25, 2022	CGI-animated streaming interactive special	Mainframe Studios	Netflix (U.S., International)	The 4th production to feature two girls named "Barbie Roberts". The inaugural interactive special of the Barbie media franchise.
Barbie: Skipper and the Big Babysitting Adventure	March 16, 2023	CGI-animated streaming television film	Mainframe Studios	Netflix (U.S., International) (Note: Its Netflix page was initially unveiled on 3 March before going offline a week later in anticipation of its actual release date.); 9Go! (Australia); YTV (Canada)	Inaugural film to star Skipper Roberts in a lead role with more screen time than previous Barbie-branded productions.
Hot Wheels: Ultimate Challenge	May 30, 2023 – August 8, 2023	Reality series	Endemol Shine North America; Workerbee TV	NBC	
Barbie Dreamhouse Challenge	July 17, 2023 – September 2023	Reality series	Mission Control Media	HGTV	
Polly Pocket: Sparkle Cove Adventure	August 21, 2023	Animated streaming television special	WildBrain Studios	Netflix	Mattel Television and WildBrain created this special as a way to close out Summer 2023. The special follows Polly Pocket as she explores an unknown world filled with magic. It is a 66-minute long film.
Barbie: A Touch of Magic	September 14, 2023 – April 18, 2024	CGI-animated streaming television series	Mainframe Studios	Streaming: Netflix (US, international); Television: 9Now (Australia); Pop (UK and Ireland)	
Monster High 2	October 5, 2023	Live-action musical film	Brightlight Pictures; Nickelodeon Productions	Nickelodeon (U.S., television); Paramount+ (streaming)	Announced on 25 October 2022 alongside the debut of Barbie: Epic Road Trip. Production began on 7 February 2023, with moments and scenes shared on social media.
Masters of the Universe: Revolution	January 25, 2024	Animated streaming television series	Powerhouse Animation Studios	Netflix	Sequel to Masters of the Universe: Revelation.
Hot Wheels Let's Race	March 4, 2024 – March 3, 2025	Animated streaming television series	Sprite Animation Studios; OLM, Digital	Netflix	
Scrabble	October 3, 2024 – present	Game show	Hasbro Entertainment; Lionsgate Alternative Television	The CW	First television series co-produced by Hasbro and Mattel.
Barney's World	October 14, 2024 – November 8, 2025	Animated television series	Nelvana	Treehouse TV (Canada, television); StackTV (Canada, streaming); Cartoonito (U.S., television); Max (U.S., streaming)	

=== Mattel Studios/Mattel Entertainment ===
Title	Original run	Format	Network	Co-production with	Notes
Little People	1999–2007	TV series	Direct-to-video	Egmont Imagination (volumes 1–13); Cuppa Coffee Studios (volumes 14–27)	
Barbie	2001–2014	Film series	Direct-to-video; Nickelodeon (U.S.)	Mainframe Entertainment/Rainmaker Animation/Rainmaker Entertainment (24 entries); Technicolor (2 entries); Arc Productions (1 entry)	Films released between 1 September 2010 and 31 March 2014 were under the sales mark name of "Barbie Entertainment".
Hot Wheels: World Race	2003	Miniseries	Cartoon Network	Mainframe Entertainment	
Rescue Heroes: The Movie	2003	Film	Direct-to-video	Nelvana	
Fisher-Price Baby Development series	2003	Miniseries	Direct-to-video	Benjamin Productions	
Polly Pocket: Lunar Eclipse	2004	Short film	Direct-to-video	Mike Young Productions	
My Scene: Jammin' in Jamaica	2004	Film	Direct-to-video	Curious Pictures	
My Scene: Masquerade Madness	2004	Film	Direct-to-video	Curious Pictures	
Polly Pocket: 2 Cool at the Pocket Plaza	2005	Short film	Direct-to-video	Curious Pictures	
Hot Wheels: AcceleRacers	2005	Television special series	Cartoon Network; Direct-to-video	Mainframe Entertainment	
My Scene Goes Hollywood: The Movie	2005	Film	Direct-to-video	Curious Pictures; Miramax Family	
PollyWorld	2006	Film	Nickelodeon	Curious Pictures	
The Barbie Diaries	2006	Animated motion-capture film	Direct-to-video; Nickelodeon	Curious Pictures	This film only showed the Mattel logo after the closing credits, which only happened once in a Barbie film, until 2014.
GeoTrax	2007–2008	TV series	Direct-to-video		
Planet Heroes	2008	TV series	Direct-to-video		
Barbie: Life in the Dreamhouse	10 January 2012 – 27 November 2015	Web shorts	YouTube; Netflix	Arc Productions	
Max Steel	2013–2015	TV series	Disney XD; Netflix	Nerd Corps Entertainment; FremantleMedia Kids & Family	
