= Nikki (Barbie) =

Mattel fashion doll

Nicole "Nikki" Watkins
- Barbie character
- First appearance: Teen Skipper; 1996
- Voiced by: Kandyse McClure (Barbie in a Christmas Carol); Nakia Burrise (Barbie: Life in the Dreamhouse, Barbie: Dreamtopia); Desirae Whitfield (2018–)

In-universe information
- Nickname: Nikki
- Occupation: Student (Barbie: Dreamhouse Adventures)
- Nationality: African-American

Nicole "Nikki" Watkins is a Mattel fashion doll, debuting in 1996 as part of the "Teen Skipper" line. Nikki was released as Skipper's first African American friend and as the younger sister of Christie, one of Barbie's best friends.

In 2006, Nikki replaced Christie as one of Barbie's best friends in the Glam Beach Line and later in the Fashion Fever Line.

== Appearances ==
Nikki has been featured in several Barbie doll series:

- In the trade paperbacks, Nikki is featured in various books such as A Surprise for a Friend.
- Nikki was also a regular in the web series Barbie: Life in the Dreamhouse and a main character in the Netflix series, Barbie: Dreamhouse Adventures, the first time her last name was confirmed to be "Watkins".
- Nikki appears in many Barbie movies, with her first appearance in the 2008 movie, Barbie in a Christmas Carol. Nikki plays the roles of Catherine and herself in the movie. She has since starred in Barbie and the Three Musketeers (playing the character of Renée, Barbie: A Fashion Fairytale, and Barbie in A Mermaid Tale (playing the character of Fallon).

In October 2020, a Barbie Vlog titled Barbie and Nikki Discuss Racism went viral. At the beginning of the video, Barbie states "it's important to have ongoing conversations about standing up to racism." The video was widely praised for bringing attention to a serious societal problem.

== Personality traits ==
In Barbie in a Christmas Carol, Nikki makes a brief appearance. In this film, she is portrayed as charitable and caring, with a love for dancing and spending time with her friends. Nikki enjoys being around Barbie and her sister Kelly.

In the Life in the Dreamhouse web series, Nikki is portrayed as a fashionable and confident DJ and fashion model with a sassy, fun-loving attitude. She has a keen sense of style and a bold personality, often using her sharp wit to stand out in conversations. Despite her confident exterior, Nikki is also deeply loyal and protective of her friends, always ready to stand up for them when needed. Her mix of charm, humor, and fierce loyalty makes her a key figure in the group.

In Barbie: Dreamhouse Adventures, Barbie: Princess Adventure, Barbie: Big City Big Dreams, Barbie: It Takes Two, and Barbie: A Touch of Magic, Nikki is a friendly and creative teenage fashion designer who attends Golden Beach High School. She’s known for her entrepreneurial drive, having started two successful businesses: a mobile bistro scooter called "Go Bistro," and a dog-walking service called "Watkins' Woofs and Walks," showcasing her love for animals.

== Fashion ==
Historically, Nikki dolls often shared outfits with Barbie in various lineups, while Teresa would receive new clothing. Nikki had distinct looks in Fashion Fever or Fashionistas where everyone has a variety of outfits in many colors and themes, which is the point of the line. Or when the doll was modeled after a version of her from a specific media appearance, such as a show or movie. Starting in 2016, Mattel significantly reduced the production of Nikki dolls as part of "The Doll Evolves" campaign, which emphasized a diverse range of nameless Barbie dolls. Despite this, Nikki continues to have dolls released that are associated with visual media. Nikki's signature hairstyle post-2017 is two buns or afro-puffs.

== Headmolds ==
- When Nikki debuted in 1996, she was given her own headmold.
- Nikki Chat Divas used a headsculpt with mouth mechanism, the "Barbie 2006 Headmold."
- Later, Nikki used a headsculpt that was similar to that of Christie, with the "Asha Headmold."
- In Top Model Series, Nikki used the "Model Of The Moment Nichelle Headmold".
- In some prototypes, Nikki used the "Asha Headmold" or "Teresa 2006 Headmold".
- In 2010, Nikki used the "Desiree Headmold".
- Barbie Holiday 201 is the only Holiday collection in which the characters have names, and Nikki is the afro girl at that moment. This makes her use the "Madam La Vinia facemold".
- In 2019, the "Barbie Dreamhouse adventures Nikki Travel Doll" used a new headmold very similar to the Mbili/Grace headmold but with teeth.

== Trivia ==
- Rapper Onika Maraj gave herself the stage name "Nicki Minaj" after Barbie's best friend Nikki, and declared that she was the "Black Barbie" as a reference to the Barbie Doll friend she aspired to be as a child.

== Residence ==
Nikki lives in Malibu, California, in the 2018 Netflix series, Barbie: Dreamhouse Adventures. In the Life in the Dreamhouse web series, she lives in a mansion called "The House of Nikki."
