= Barbie: Life in the Dreamhouse =

Computer-animated shorts series

- Genre: Comedy
- Based on: Barbie by Mattel
- Developed by: David Wiebe
- Voices of: Kate Higgins; Sean Hankinson; Paula Rhodes; Charlie Bodin; Katie Crown; Nakia Burrise; Laura Gerow; Lillian Sofia; Ashlyn Selich; Tara Sands; Todd Resnick; Grant George; David Wiebe
- Theme music composer: Rebecca Kneubuhl; Gabriel Mann
- Opening theme: Life in the Dreamhouse
- Ending theme: Life in the Dreamhouse (only in specials)
- Countries of origin: United States; Canada
- Original language: English
- No. of seasons: 7
- No. of episodes: 75 (including 2 TV specials) (list of episodes)

Production
- Executive producers: For Mattel: David Voss; Rob Hudnut; David Wiebe; For Arc Productions: Kallan Kagan; Stephen Gallop; Dan Mokriy; Nikhilesh Luthra
- Producer: Margaret M. Dean
- Editors: Jeremy Montgomery (29 episodes); Matt Ahrens (8 episodes); Gavin Ebedes (3 episodes); Brianne Wells (1 episode); Marie-Hélène Boulianne (1 episode)
- Running time: 4 minutes (11–25 minutes for specials)
- Production companies: Arc Productions; Mattel Studios (2012–2013); Mattel Playground Productions (2013–2015); Resnick Interactive Group

Original release
- Network: YouTube; Nickelodeon (TV specials)
- Release: January 20, 2012 – November 27, 2015

Barbie: Life in the Dreamhouse is a web series of CGI-animated shorts produced by Arc Productions and Mattel. The series was released on YouTube and the official Barbie website from January 20, 2012, to November 27, 2015.

The series is currently available on Netflix, though Netflix streams the series only as specialized bundles of episodes instead of in the original chronological order. Nickelodeon aired two "continuity" specials on September 1, 2013. The series later spawned a spinoff, titled Barbie: Dreamhouse Adventures, released from May 3, 2018, to April 12, 2020, on Netflix.

== Setting ==
The series is set in a fictional version of Malibu, California, where all of its inhabitants are dolls. The dolls behave like humans, though a number of the show's gags rely on their doll-like nature. The series centers on the life of Barbie, her friends, her siblings, her boyfriend Ken, and a number of pets. The series is stylized as a mock reality show featuring confessionals of the characters in between scenes. The show heavily relies on slapstick humor, and makes a lot of satirical and self-parody references to the Barbie doll line.

== Characters ==
- Barbara Millicent "Barbie" Roberts is the lead character of the show. She lives in a large pink mansion called the "Dreamhouse" along with her younger sisters Skipper, Stacie, Chelsea and their pets. Barbie is a fashion icon and has had over 135 careers and over and over again; though a celebrity in Malibu, she is friendly, humble and good-natured. Voiced by Kate Higgins.
- Kenneth "Ken" Carson is Barbie's long-time boyfriend. Ken strives to be the perfect boyfriend for Barbie and is always there when Barbie needs him. He is an inventor who makes high-end machines and gadgets for Barbie to use, though they usually end up malfunctioning. Voiced by Sean Hankinson.
- Skipper Roberts is Barbie's teenage sister who enjoys technology and DJing. Voiced by Paula Rhodes.
- Stacie Roberts is Barbie's tomboy tween sister who loves sports and organization. Voiced by Paula Rhodes.
- Chelsea Roberts is Barbie's youngest sister who is mostly interested in collecting and playing with stuffed animals (including her eye-catching favorite Unicorn Plushie of the Month or simply Plushie). Voiced by Laura Gerow.
- Teresa is Barbie's extremely chatty but ditzy best friend who lives near the Dreamhouse and often makes silly, half-witted remarks. Voiced by Katie Crown.
- Nikki: Barbie's principal Black American best friend who is also close friends with Teresa. She manages a fashion blog and loves taking pictures as a hobby. She is creative, smart, sassy, outspoken, and very protective of her friends. Voiced by Nakia Burrise.
- Raquelle is Barbie's frenemy and rival for Ken's affections. She lives a very posh lifestyle in an attempt to outshine Barbie. She is portrayed as vain and arrogant and is not above deceit to attain what she wants. She is also clumsy, and her plans to sabotage Barbie often backfire. Voiced by Haviland Stillwell.
- Ryan is Raquelle's twin brother and struggling musician. He is in love with Barbie and often writes songs about her to impress her. He is a frenemy of Ken and will often brawl with him to win Barbie's affections. Like his sister, Ryan is also very vain and is often seen carrying around large cardboard standups of himself. Voiced by Charlie Bodin.
- Midge Hadley is Barbie's childhood best friend from Barbie's hometown of Willows, Wisconsin. She and Barbie lost touch when Barbie's family moved to Malibu. Prior to her makeover, she appears in black-and-white dressed in vintage fashion and speaks in the 1960s slang. She is also quirky, smart, and is fond of arts and crafts (particularly macramé). She moves to Malibu and develops a crush on Ryan, who does likewise after her makeover. Voiced by Ashlyn Selich.
- Summer is Barbie's fun and energetic best friend who loves sports and games. She is competitive, and her hyperactive nature is sometimes too much to handle. Voiced by Tara Sands.
- Grace is Barbie's new best friend and a new resident in Malibu. She is very smart and interested in science. Voiced by Lillian Sofia.
- Closet is a robot who lives in and manages Barbie's closet. Closet speaks in monotone and has an evil side. He is often the antagonist and believes to have a father/son relationship with his creator, Ken. Voiced by Todd Resnick.
- Background Clones are different versions of the main characters. Voiced by Sean Hankinson, Nakia Burrise, Paula Rhodes, Laura Gerow, Tara Sands, and Haviland Stillwell.

== Episode list ==
=== Season 1 (2012) ===
No.	Title	Original air date
1	Closet Princess	May 11, 2012
2	Happy Birthday Chelsea	May 11, 2012
3	Pet Peeve	May 18, 2012
4	Rhapsody in Buttercream	May 18, 2012
5	Ken-tastic, Hair-tastic	May 25, 2012
6	Party Foul	May 25, 2012
7	Day at the Beach	June 1, 2012
8	Sticker it Up	June 8, 2012
9	Oh How Campy	June 15, 2012
10	Bad Hair Day	June 22, 2012
11	Licensed to Drive	June 29, 2012
12	I Want My BTV	July 6, 2012
13	Gifts, Goofs, Galore	July 13, 2012
14	The Barbie Boutique	July 20, 2012
15	Sand Away	September 19, 2012
16	Barbie Technical Institute	September 21, 2012
17	Ken and Robot	September 21, 2012
18	Fan Mail	October 10, 2012

=== Season 2 (2012-2013) ===
No.	Title	Original air date
15	The Reunion Show	October 12, 2012
16	Closet Princess 2.0	October 19, 2012
17	Sisters Ahoy	October 26, 2012
18	The Shrinkerator	November 1, 2012
19	Plethora of Puppies	November 8, 2012
20	Closet Clothes Out	November 15, 2012
21	Accidentally on Porpoise	November 22, 2012
22	Gone Glitter Gone - Part 1	November 29, 2012
23	Gone Glitter Gone - Part 2	December 5, 2012
24	Ryan's Greatest Hits	December 19, 2012
25	Everybody Needs a Ken	January 17, 2013

=== Season 3 (2013) ===
No.	Title	Original air date
24	Playing Heart to Get	February 6, 2013
25	Catty on the Catwalk	February 13, 2013
26	Help Wanted	February 20, 2013
27	Spooky Sleepover	February 27, 2013
28	A Smidge of Midge	March 6, 2013
29	Occupational Hazards	March 13, 2013
30	Ooh How Campy, Too	March 20, 2013
31	Let's Make a Doll	March 26, 2013

=== Season 4 (2013) ===
No.	Title	Original air date
32	Endless Summer	June 26, 2013
33	Sour Loser	July 3, 2013
34	Another Day at the Beach	July 10, 2013
35	Happy Bathday to You	July 17, 2013
36	Cringing in the Rain	July 24, 2013
37	The Ken Den	July 31, 2013
38	Primp My Ride	August 7, 2013
39	Mall Mayhem	August 14, 2013
40	The Upgradening	August 21, 2013

=== Season 5 (2013) ===
No.	Title	Original air date
41	Doctor Barbie	October 2, 2013
42	Stuck With You	October 9, 2013
43	The Only Way to Fly	October 16, 2013
44	Perf Pool Party	October 23, 2013
45	Trapped in the Dreamhouse	October 30, 2013

=== Season 6 (2014-2015) ===
No.	Title	Original air date
46	Style Super Squad - Part 1	February 5, 2014
47	Style Super Squad - Part 2	February 19, 2014
48	Little Bad Dress	March 19, 2014
49	Going to the Dogs	April 2, 2014
50	Dream a Little Dreamhouse	April 16, 2014
51	Mayor of Malibu	April 30, 2014
52	Bizzaro Barbie	May 28, 2014
53	Doll vs. Dessert	June 11, 2014
54	Going Viral	July 9, 2014
55	Girls Day Out	July 23, 2014
56	Business is Barking	September 4, 2014
57	When the Cat's Away	September 17, 2014
58	Ice Ice, Barbie - Part 1	October 16, 2014
59	Ice Ice, Barbie - Part 2	October 29, 2014
60	The Amaze Chase	November 12, 2014
61	New Girl in Town	March 4, 2015
62	Malibu's Empirical Emporium	April 18, 2015

=== Season 7 (2015) ===
No.	Title	Original air date
63	Red Carpet Caper	April 24, 2015
64	Mission Impawsible	May 1, 2015
65	The Telethon	May 8, 2015
66	Don't Bet On It	May 15, 2015
67	Dissin' Cousins	May 22, 2015
68	Alone in the Dreamhouse	May 29, 2015
69	Mooning Over You	June 26, 2015
70	Sidewalk Showdown	July 30, 2015
71	Sisters' Fun Day	August 1, 2015
72	Send in the Clones - Part 1	August 27, 2015
73	Send in the Clones - Part 2	September 11, 2015
74	Send in the Clones - Part 3	September 18, 2015
75	The Fantasticest Journey	September 25, 2015
76	Attention Shoppers (Unreleased)	September 30, 2015
77	You Go 'Gurt! (Unreleased)	October 1, 2015

Notes

- Episodes 15-16 in season 1 and episodes 24 and 25 in season 2 are the bonus episodes in those seasons.
- The Reunion Show comes before Closet Princess 2.0 despite it having a clip of Ken and Ryan's fight in that episode.
- The title of episode 36 in season 4 is a parody of Singin' in the Rain.
- The title of episode 64 in season 7 is a wordplay on the 1996 film Mission: Impossible.
- Episode 71 in season 7 features Fifth Harmony.
- Two unreleased episodes have not been fully released, Attention Shoppers and You Go' Gurt.

== See also ==
- Barbie (media franchise)
- Barbie Dreamhouse Adventures
- Barbie Dreamtopia
- Barbie: It Takes Two
