= Barbie: Skipper and the Big Babysitting Adventure =

2023 Barbie television film

- Promotional artwork
- Genre: Comedy; Adventure; children's film
- Based on: Barbie's friends and family by Mattel Barbie Dreamhouse Adventures
- Written by: Daniel Bryan Franklin
- Directed by: Steve Daye
- Voices of: America Young; Kirsten Day; Cassandra Morris; Cassidy Naber; Lisa Fuson; Greg Chun; Ritesh Rajan; Cristina Milizia; Stephanie Sheh; Ogie Banks; Madelyn Kratzer; Natalie Lashkari; Laila Berzins; Ben Pronsky; Jacob Craner; Zaela Rae; Samir Corbin; Bill Rogers; Henry Wu; Archana Rajan; Innocent Ekakitie; Alex Cazares; Julyza Commodore
- Composers: Ryan Franks; Scott Nickoley

Production
- Executive producers: Christopher Keenan; Frederic Soulie
- Producers: Susan Corbin; Jeffrey R.Hawley
- Animator: Cartoon Conrad Productions Inc. (2D animation)
- Editors: Colin Adams; Emir Gidel; Bruno Kohler; Marc-Andre Monten; Gonda-Bastian Sinagowitz
- Running time: 60 minutes
- Production companies: Mainframe Studios; Mattel Television

Original release
- Network: Netflix
- Release: March 16, 2023

Barbie: Skipper and the Big Babysitting Adventure is a 2023 CGI-animated adventure comedy television film directed by Steve Daye, written by Daniel Bryan Franklin and debuted on Netflix in the United States on 16 March.

The 42nd entry in the Barbie film series and the 5th to feature Barbie's family and/or friends, this is also the first production in the Barbie media franchise since Barbie: Big City, Big Dreams not to feature the Barbie "Brooklyn" Roberts character. The film plot centers on Barbie's in-universe young sister, Skipper Roberts, striving to perfect her babysitting skills whiles having to deal with the enmity between her and her rival, Tammy Bounceaway from Barbie Dreamhouse Adventures.

It film also aired on POP in the UK and Ireland on 2 April and had a home video release in Germany through Swiss retailer Weltbild.

== Premise ==
"Barbie's younger sister, Skipper, was touted as a babysitting expert, but when her babysitting business hits a snag, she takes a summer job at a water park and tries out different first jobs with some new friends. Skipper uses babysitting skills to save a nearly-collapsed birthday party at the park. The success renews Skipper's confidence in her babysitting business and she and her new friends start a babysitting squad."

== Plot ==
The film begins with Skipper's imagination of saving the children of Malibu from "evil Stacie" and her friends, Navya and Chantal. She leads her superhero team to confront "evil Stacie". Skipper then flings "evil Stacie" into the sky and disappears. Minutes after, she failed to quietly move of the scene and the children wake up and have a food fight; when their parents come to pick them up, they see the food all over Skipper's living room they and begin leaving negative reviews of Skipper's babysitting service, leading other parents to cancel their previous scheduled appointments.

Later on, while having ice cream in their kitchen, Skipper asks Barbie for help in salvaging her babysitting service. Barbie, while she'd love to her sister, won't be able to do so—as it turns out:

- Barbie will be off doing volunteer in the rainforest for most of the summer while Stacie and Chelsea will be off at a sleepaway camp.
- Because of all that, it'll just be Skipper and her parents (George and Margaret) at home for most of the summer.

Skipper soon discovers that her friends, Navya and Chantal, are also going to be gone for the summer. She then tries hanging out with Ken, but he's too busy with his job as a lifeguard to be able to spend any time with Skipper. Skipper then decides to look for another job until her babysitting business picks up again.

Skipper then hears a girl singing, making her want to get to know her where she revealed her name as Joy. Tammy, from Dreamhouse Adventures, comes and shoves customers away to the front of the queue and barks orders at Joy to serve her a specialized smoothie to her taste, which Skipper takes exception to. Joy forgets to put the lid on a smoothie blender properly, which ended up sputtering all over and got Joy fired, pleasing Tammy as she walked out of the scene. Later, Skipper caught up with her on her skateboard and Joy showed her appreciation to speaking up for her, though she knew her former job would give her no recording contract as she loves to sing. As Skipper loves to DJ, the girls began bonding over their shared love of music and lack of summer jobs. A guy with a sandwich board directs them to the Oceans Extreme water park for summer jobs. When Skipper and Joy go for job interviews, they meet a girl named Anna, who loves making jewelry, hoping the park will carry her jewelry line and heard that the boss at the park is a "monster". Skipper gets interviewed first and finds out the boss is non-other than Tammy herself, whose father Milton owns the park. Knowing that Tammy would never hire her due to her being Barbie's "biggest rival", Skipper headed for the exit but Milton busts in and quickly questions his daughter about the job interviews whiles on phone interviews. Tammy tried lying to her father about not getting quality employees then until Milton pointed to the outgoing Skipper. Not satisfied with Tammy's response, Milton himself interviews and hires Skipper and then goes to the interview waiting room to declare all the job seekers there hired before leaving, infuriating Tammy.

Skipper, Joy and Anna meet a darker-toned girl named Cheri, who wants to be a dog walker she has no customers. Anna suggests that Cheri work at the doggy day care in the park. The next day, Skipper gets to work early, but Tammy tries to block Skipper from coming in the park in an attempt to make her late, until Milton indirectly intervened whiles on the phone. Tammy tells Milton that all the staff positions are filled when he asks, but Milton sends Skipper to work at the jewelry kiosk with Anna. Tammy tries to get her father's attention, but to no avail. Tammy then provides Skipper and Anna with cheap jewelry that no one wants to buy, but Skipper and Anna sell the latter's jewelry instead, invoking Milton's interest as he saw crowds and Tammy took credit to please her father. Tammy transfers Skipper to the snack bar where Joy is working in attempt to annoy her. A girl named Erica and her older brother Derek don't have money for ice cream, so Skipper and Joy give it to them for free, leading to the influx of dozens of children come to get free ice cream. Tammy thinks her father will not be pleased seeing this so she tells him, but Milton notices the children are spending money on other things at the snack bar and gives Skipper and Joy the afternoon off, so they visit Cheri, who has her own dream dog care center. Joy shared her dream of playing in a huge concert and Skipper's to revive a babysitting empire with her best friends.

Skipper notices that the park doesn't have daycare-area for younger children who're too small to go on the rides and makes plans to do so. While eating dinner with her parents later that night, the three receive a letter from Stacie and Chelsea, who tell them about all the fun they're having at their summer camp, during which they mention a gaming bus, which gives Skipper an idea. At the park, Milton makes Skipper employee of the week, and she suggests setting up a daycare center/play area for young children too small to go on the rides so that they can still have fun while their parents and older siblings go on the rides. Milton's on board with this, which makes Tammy jealous. Tammy looks online to see if she can find anything bad about Skipper and she did, finding negative reviews for Skipper's babysitting service. When Skipper and Tammy are alone, Skipper tells Tammy they could rent a gaming bus for the little children and Tammy began to doubt, reading the reviews aloud to her and plans on revealing them to Milton. Tammy then tells Skipper to clean a dirty pool. Tammy gets a gaming bus and children began to board, but needs her father to pay for it, so she leaves to tell him while the driver of the bus, Pete, waits impatiently for her return. While Skipper struggles at work, she calls Barbie for advice. Barbie is being pestered by a monkey in the Amazon, who then steals Barbie's phone gets stolen when she tries to reveal Tammy's stance to her and he hangs it up. Skipper decides to quit. Tammy asks Milton for money, but he demands she deliver a professional sales pitch to prove that his spending will be profitable. Skipper sees Joy, Anna and Cheri coming with garden tools to support her with. Skipper became annoyed that Tammy stole her bus idea. Skipper and her friends board the bus and see Erica, Derek and other children playing inside with Cheri closing the bus door behind her.

During Tammy's presentation in her office, Milton hears of pie and zooms out, leaving a note to Tammy, who after looking at the picture of the bus remembers Pete was waiting for her outside. Pete begins to get frustrated and drives the bus away, unaware of children inside. Tammy sees it going and tries to call Pete, who while driving was busily listening to a telenovela audiobook. After Joy does karaoke, the bus jolts, with Skipper and her friends realizing that the bus has left the park. Skipper comes up with a plan to keep the children busy until the bus stops, then ask the driver to return them back to the park. At a parking lot, Pete gets off the bus and drives away in another car, leaving Skipper and the others stranded. Skipper calls Tammy, who wants to avoid being humiliated by Milton learning about the missing gaming bus, so she sends a limousine. Erica then goes missing, frustrating Skipper, but she kept her head and told the children to play hide and seek to find her. A sandstorm appears from nowhere and Skipper instructs everyone to hold hands, as she views will protect the children.

Milton returns and Tammy distracts him with an overly long presentation while she waits for Skipper and the others to return with the kids. Meanwhile, the children notice an airplane, which was revealed as the first unmanned, auto-piloted birthday party plane and it was developed by an entrepreneur named Mr. Moneyclown. A flight attendant lets the children in because she assumes they are the flight testers. Skipper and her friends follow them into the plane, but Erica presses the take-off button. After the test flight, the limo comes to collect Skipper, her friends and the children, but gets stuck in traffic upon reaching Malibu. Tammy video-calls Skipper to know of their location and with her stating their inability to make it on time, Tammy orders a boat. Skipper questions Tammy's seriousness at that, to which she replied "please", which Skipper barely heard from her and both smiled on opposite sides of their phone screens.

On the boat, Captain Arlene thinks they should wait until the fog clears, which Anna has little time to. Skipper sees some dolphins and speaks dolphin to ask for help and they agree to guide the boat back to the park. Milton gets bored of Tammy's presentation and goes outside just as Skipper and the others return. Skipper tells him he missed the gaming bus, but all the customers were satisfied. Erica and Derek excitedly tell their mother about the adventure they went on, which she assumes is just their imagination. Milton agrees to make a daycare for the park but decides against getting a gaming bus.

Skipper then encourages Tammy to speak up for herself, which she finally did to Milton, who got taken aback at seeing her stance she didn't expose beforehand. She asserts she will open a day care center because she finally saw what the children needed, even without the bus and Milton liked Tammy taking initiative, though he insists on not renting the bus. Skipper suggests she and Tammy take on the latter's idea of cleaning the dirty pool, as it would make a better day care than the bus. Tammy than tells Milton that it will take little time should they all work together and it would be free so he agrees. Tammy and Skipper hug but quickly retreats and reminds herself of their boundaries. Tammy hugs Milton, who views it as not business-like and tells him that not everything is about business.

With the new day care open, Skipper finds it hard to believe summer is almost over. Tammy asks Skipper if she will come back next year and compliments Skipper for her babysitting skills and making the park more interesting, to which they fist bump, with Skipper satisfied with the state of her job and the day care. Skipper's family and Ken visit the park.

After Barbie praises Skipper on a job well done, Skipper reminds Barbie that she was going to tell her something about Tammy during their video call from before—Barbie reveals that what she was trying to tell her about Tammy is that Tammy truly isn't a bad person, but she sometimes needs help remembering that. Joy sings "My Friends" while Skipper disc jockeys and Milton hugs Tammy.

== Voice cast ==
- Kirsten Day as Skipper, Tammy
- America Young as Barbie
- Cassandra Morris as Stacie
- Natalie Lashkari as Chelsea
- Greg Chun as George, Cooks, Zincenzio Dracula
- Lisa Fuson as Margaret
- Ritesh Rajan as Ken, Mob Guy, Scary Monster, Tough Jock
- Bill Rogers as Milton, Trucker Pete, Mr. Moneyclown, Extremely Tall Kid
- Stephanie Sheh as Hip Girl, Flight Attendant, Erica & Derek's Mom
- Ogie Banks as Sandwich Board Guy, Driver
- Zaela Rae as Joy
- Julyza Commodore as Cheri, Chantal
- Archana Rajan as Navya
- Laila Berzins as captain, Handsome Host
- Innocent Ekakitie as Deacon
- Madelyn Kratzer as Erica
- Cristina Milizia as Maria, Lola, Flight Controller
- Samir Corbin as Additional Voices
- Alex Cazares as Anna, Brian, Helga, Big Kid, Book on Tape
- Henry Wu as Derek, New Kid

Other characters include Barbie's puppy, Taffy and DJ.

== Music ==
This film features two original songs; "It's A Party Now!" and "My Friends", both performed by Zaela Rae as Joy with Kirsten Daye and Julyza Commodore providing back-up vocals. However, they were not incorporated into a soundtrack album released by Arts Music on music streaming services, as both songs can only be accessed on Spotify and YouTube, making this the first Barbie-branded production since Barbie in A Mermaid Tale not to have any song on a music streaming service.

== See also ==
- List of Barbie films
