= Barbie: It Takes Two =

2022 Barbie television series

- Promotional artwork
- Genre: Adventure; Friendship; Comedy
- Based on: Barbie: Big City, Big Dreams Barbie's friends and family by Mattel
- Developed by: Marsha Griffin
- Directed by: Scott Pleydell-Pearce (series); Collette Sunderman (voice)
- Voices of: America Young; Tatiana Varria; Nicolas Roye; Gabriel "Gabe" Kunda; Mela Lee; Xavier Patterson; Taylor Lauren; Kirsten Day; Cassandra Morris; Cassidy Naber
- Theme music composer: Matthew Tishler; Andrew Underberg
- Composer: James Linyenej Korforkan
- Country of origin: United States
- Original language: English
- No. of seasons: 2
- No. of episodes: 26

Production
- Executive producers: Christopher Keenan; Adam Bonnett; Frederic Soulie
- Producers: Marsha Griffin (creative); Diane A. Crea (senior)
- Production locations: Malibu, California; Brooklyn, New York City
- Running time: 23 minutes
- Production company: Mattel Television

Original release
- Network: Netflix
- Release: March 4 – October 1, 2022

Related
- Barbie: Big City, Big Dreams

Barbie: It Takes Two is an American CGI-animated television series serving as the television adaptation of and based on the 2021 television film, Barbie: Big City, Big Dreams.

Unveiled by Mattel Television on 1 February 2022 on its website and later picked up by news sources, this is the second full-length TV series in the Barbie media franchise after Barbie: Dreamhouse Adventures.

== Background ==
On 1 February 2022, Mattel Television unveiled an initial 13-episode CGI-animated television adaptation of the film titled Barbie: It Takes Two. Executives of Barbie: Big City, Big Dreams as well as Mainframe Studios reprise their roles in the series with the inclusion of Marsha Griffin (who previously wrote scripts for 3 Barbie films between 2015 and 2016 in Barbie in Princess Power, Barbie in Rock 'N Royals and Barbie: Spy Squad) as a creative producer.

== Premise ==
Following on from the end of their screen debut in Barbie: Big City, Big Dreams, the Barbie from Malibu and Barbie from Brooklyn have fun, share the spotlight and pursue their music dreams in New York City while also learning about each other's polar opposite families, friends and cultures.

== Characters ==
=== Main ===
- America Young as Barbie "Malibu" Roberts
- Tatiana Varria as Barbie "Brooklyn" Roberts
- Nicolas Roye as Rafael/Rafa

=== Recurring ===
- Gabriel "Gabe" Kunda as Kelvin "Kel" Roberts, father of Barbie "Brooklyn" Roberts
- Mela Lee as Simone Roberts, mother of Barbie "Brooklyn" Roberts
- Xavier Patterson as Jackson Roberts, godson of Barbie "Brooklyn" Roberts
- Taylor Lauren as Jayla Roberts, goddaughter of Barbie "Brooklyn" Roberts
- Nicolas Roye as Male Teacher at the Handler Arts Academy
- Ritesh Rajan as Ken Carson
- Kirsten Day as Skipper Roberts
- Cassandra Morris as Stacie Roberts
- Cassidy Naber (episodes 1–13) & Anna McGill (episodes 14–26) as Chelsea Roberts
- Greg Chun as George Roberts, father of Barbie "Malibu" Roberts
- Lisa Fuson as Margaret Roberts, mother of Barbie "Malibu" Roberts, and Poppy Reardon, an antagonistic neighbor.
- Cristina Milizia as Teresa
- Desirae Whitfield as Nikki Watkins
- Stephanie Sheh as Renee
- Emma Galvin as Daisy
- Jason Marsden as Magnifico
- Yuri Lowenthal as Stefan and Wilhelm
- Christopher Niosi as Dash
- Dorian Plague as Epiphany
- Elise Gabriel as Lyla, Meditation Guide
- Aleks Le as James
- Melanie Minichino as Vanessa and Phoebe
- Petey Gibson as Tyler
- Ricky Bricks as Larry Herron
- Max Mitchell as Big Base
- Xavier Patterson as Jackson
- Jason Williams as Emmitt
- Robbie Daymond as Paul
- Cassidy Huff as Emma
- Billy Kametz as Trey Reardon, Poppy and Whittaker's teenage son
- Giselle Fernandez as Emmie
- Conor Hall as Bertram
- Nicolas Roye as Mateo
- Sarah H. Fairbrook as Pandora

== Broadcast ==
The series debuted on television in Australia via 9Go! on March 4 and on Pop in the UK and Ireland on April 2 before launching on April 8 on Netflix in the United States. On April 10, it aired on YTV in Canada and on Canal Panda in Portugal the exact week later. Mattel later revealed through TheWrap the second half of 13 episodes would be released on 1 October on Netflix.

== Episodes ==
| Season | Episodes | Originally released |
|---|---|---|
| 1 | 13 | April 8, 2022 |
| 2 | 13 | October 1, 2022 |

=== Season 1 (2022) ===
The table below shows only the titles and episode summaries from the American Netflix release.

| No. overall | No. in season | Title | Directed by | Written by | Original release date |
|---|---|---|---|---|---|
| 1 | 1 | "It Takes Two" | Cassandra Mackay (credited as Cassi Simonds) | Marsha F. Griffin | April 8, 2022 |
Malibu and Brooklyn must convince their parents to let them stay together after the girls get accepted to the arts academy of their dreams (The Handler Arts Academy).
| 2 | 2 | "First Day Frenzy" | Larry Anderson | Aydrea Walden | April 8, 2022 |
"Malibu" Barbie is homesick, and "Brooklyn" Barbie loses her voice, but the best friends find a way to help each other and embrace their new lives in NYC.
| 3 | 3 | "Barbies Rising" | Dominic "Dom" MacKinnon | Lisa Steele | April 8, 2022 |
A chance to encounter with a media VIP by name "Auto Phoenix" at a pretzel cart moves Malibu and Brooklyn closer to pop stardom — despite their other plans.
| 4 | 4 | "Gone to the Dogs" | Cassandra Mackay (credited as Cassi Simonds) | Josh Haber | April 8, 2022 |
Who let the dogs out and into the fashion show? The besties get busy as dog walkers to help save up for their first professional record demo.
| 5 | 5 | "Delivery Debacle" | Larry Anderson | Meg Favreau | April 8, 2022 |
Malibu and Brooklyn help deliver pastries for a cafe. But the job's not so sweet when the duo tries to help customers solve their personal problems.
| 6 | 6 | "Surprise, Surprise" | Dominic "Dom" MacKinnon | Denise Downer | April 8, 2022 |
"Malibu" Barbie heads back home to reunite her mom with a surprise birthday party — but she'll have a wild time trying to keep it all a secret!
| 7 | 7 | "Start Small" | Cassandra Mackay (credited as Cassi Simonds) | Michael Carrington | April 8, 2022 |
"Brooklyn" Barbie helps "Malibu" Barbie learn a valuable lesson after Malibu tries to bring her family's Cleanup Day tradition to her New York neighborhood.
| 8 | 8 | "We Are Family" | Larry Anderson | Crescent Imani Novell | April 8, 2022 |
Malibu and Brooklyn remix trouble into good tunes when unexpected visitors tag along as the duo records their first song.
| 9 | 9 | "Turkey Trouble" | Dominic "Dom" MacKinnon | Shawnee Gibbs & Shawnelle Gibbs | April 8, 2022 |
| 10 | 10 | "Two Stars Are Born" | Scott Pleydell-Pearce | Kendall Michele Haney | April 8, 2022 |
Malibu and Brooklyn get a taste of stardom and soon discover life in the spotlight isn't all it's cracked up to be.
| 11 | 11 | "Triple Threat" | Larry Anderson | Isabel Galupo | April 8, 2022 |
While saving up for their next recording session, Malibu and Brooklyn take on a babysitting gig with some trouble-making kids.
| 12 | 12 | "The Great Outdoors: Part 1" | Dominic "Dom" MacKinnon | Crescent Imani Novell | April 8, 2022 |
A camping trip becomes complicated after Malibu and Brooklyn both try to do too much instead of just relaxing.
| 13 | 13 | "The Great Outdoors: Part 2" | Larry Anderson | Lisa Steele | April 8, 2022 |
Malibu and Brooklyn work with the squad to solve the mystery of the loud screech in the woods — and finish their latest song.

=== Season 2 (2022) ===
| No. overall | No. in season | Title | Directed by | Written by | Original release date |
|---|---|---|---|---|---|
| 14 | 1 | "We've Got Magic to Do" | Dom MacKinnon | Aydrea Walden | October 1, 2022 |
| 15 | 2 | "Cut It Out" | Larry Anderson | Callie C. Miller | October 1, 2022 |
| 16 | 3 | "Studio Sleuths" | Dom MacKinnon | Katie Kaniewski | October 1, 2022 |
| 17 | 4 | "For the Record" | Larry Anderson | Crescent Imani Novell | October 1, 2022 |
| 18 | 5 | "Knock it Off" | Dom MacKinnon | Jessica Tsou | October 1, 2022 |
| 19 | 6 | "Costumed Capers" | Larry Anderson | Dan Salgarolo | October 1, 2022 |
| 20 | 7 | "Cupid Shuffle" | Dom MacKinnon | Kendall Michele Haney | October 1, 2022 |
| 21 | 8 | "Team No Screens" | Larry Anderson | Crescent Imani Novell | October 1, 2022 |
| 22 | 9 | "Festival Fiasco" | Dom MacKinnon | Shawnee Gibbs & Shawnelle Gibbs | October 1, 2022 |
| 23 | 10 | "Buddy's Is Booming" | Larry Anderson | Isabel Galupo | October 1, 2022 |
| 24 | 11 | "To Dye For" | Dom MacKinnon | Lisa Steele | October 1, 2022 |
| 25 | 12 | "Game On!" | Larry Anderson | Ahlan Williams | October 1, 2022 |
| 26 | 13 | "Race to the Finish" | Dom MacKinnon | Kendall Michele Haney | October 1, 2022 |
