= Barbie: Princess Adventure =

2020 Animated television film

- Promotional artwork
- Genre: Children/Family; Musical; Adventure; Comedy
- Based on: Barbie: Dreamhouse Adventures
- Written by: Ann Austen
- Directed by: Conrad Helten
- Voices of: America Young; Erica Lindbeck; Kirsten Day; Cassandra Morris; Cassidy Naber; Ritesh Rajan; Greg Chun; Lisa Fuson; Stephanie Sheh; Ogie Banks; Benjamin Pronsky
- Composer: The Math Club
- Countries of origin: United States; Canada
- Original language: English

Production
- Executive producers: Christopher Keenan; Adam Bonnett; Frederic Soulie
- Producer: Susan Corbin
- Running time: 72 minutes
- Production companies: Mattel Television; Mainframe Studios

Original release
- Network: Netflix
- Release: September 1, 2020

Barbie: Princess Adventure is a 2020 CGI-animated musical adventure comedy children's television film directed by Conrad Helten and written by Ann Austen, which was first released on Netflix in the United States on September 1, 2020.

The 37th entry in the Barbie film series, this is the first Barbie-branded production produced by Mattel Television since their mid-2019 rebrand from Mattel Creations and also Mainframe Studios since their announcement to return to their naming origins as Mainframe Entertainment on March 16, 2020 as part of a rebrand from their previous name, Rainmaker Studios. It is the second television film in the Barbie media franchise after Barbie Dolphin Magic (2017) and would be the catalyst for Mattel shifting the focus of the franchise to television forays.

== Production ==
It is the first film adaptation of the TV series Barbie: Dreamhouse Adventures, as Dolphin Magic was marketed by Mattel as its "spiritual" pilot.

== Plot ==
Barbie takes a road trip to the Kingdom of Floravia, having been invited by Princess Amelia. Barbie discovers that Amelia, whose life is rigidly controlled by her royal advisor Alfonso, wants to switch places with her for a week because the two look almost identical. Barbie agrees, and Amelia goes on to enjoy a week of freedom before her coronation. Amelia is kidnapped by her fiancé, Prince Johan, who uncovers the ruse and wants to force Amelia to marry him so he can rule both his country and Floravia. Barbie rescues the princess, and they foil Johan's plot. Afterwards, Amelia is crowned, and both Barbie and Amelia agree to remain true to themselves.

== Voice cast ==
The voice cast are as follows:

- America Young as Barbie
- Erica Lindbeck as Princess Amelia
- Elli Moore as the singing voice of Barbie
- Ritesh Rajan as Ken
- Kirsten Day as Skipper and Tammy Bounceaway
- Cassandra Morris as Stacie
- Cassidy Naber as Chelsea
- Nakia Burrise as Principal Miller
- Greg Chun as George (Barbie's father)
- Lisa Fuson as Margaret (Barbie's mother)
- Cristina Milizia as Teresa
- Desirae Whitfield as Nikki
- Stephanie Sheh as Renee
- Emma Galvin as Daisy
- Eamon Brennan as Trey Reardon
- Ogie Banks as the twins; Ned and Ted Johnson (nicknamed The Dudes)
- Amelia Diecker as Emma
- Dave Fennoy as Alfonso
- Ben Pronsky as Reggie
- Angelo Restaino as Johan
- Tara Sands as Rose Ross (uncredited)

Other characters include Rose Ross, Snowy, and Morning Star, as well as Barbie's puppies, Taffy, Honey, DJ, and Rookie.

== Soundtrack ==
Barbie: Princess Adventure: Original Motion Picture Soundtrack

Soundtrack album by The Math Club
- Released: August 28, 2020
- Genre: Children's music
- Length: 14:17
- Label: Mattel–Arts Music
- Producer: The Math Club

The eponymous soundtrack album was released on August 28, 2020, on multiple digital music streaming services.

All tracks are written by Matthew Tishler, Andrew Underberg, and additionally, The Math Club.

No.	Title	Length
1.	"Try It On"	2:27
2.	"Somewhere New"	1:54
3.	"(Not) A Picture Perfect Girl"	1:55
4.	"Life in Color"	3:22
5.	"King of the Kingdom"	2:00
6.	"This Is My Moment"	3:22
Total length:		14:17

== Reception ==
Jennifer Green of Common Sense Media gave the film a positive review, saying, "It's hard not to admit that these animated adventures offer upbeat fun." Screen Rant noted that the film bore many similarities to the Princess Switch film series.

== See also ==
- List of Barbie films
- Barbie (media franchise)
- Barbie Dreamhouse Adventures
- Barbie as the Princess and the Pauper
- Barbie: The Princess & the Popstar
