= Barbie: Big City, Big Dreams =

2021 Barbie television film

- Promotional artwork
- Genre: Buddy film; Comedy; Musical; Children/Family
- Based on: Barbie's friends and family by: Mattel; Barbie Dreamhouse Adventures
- Written by: Christopher Keenan; Catherine "Kate" Splaine
- Directed by: Scott Plydell-Pearce
- Voices of: America Young; Amber May; Daniel M.K. Cohen; Cassidy Naber; Ritesh Rajan; Lisa Fuson; Salli Saffioti; Alejandro Saab; Stephanie Sheh; Nakia Burrise; Giselle Fernandez
- Composers: Alice Kenstick; Matthew Koma; Koman Jila
- Countries of origin: United States; Canada
- Original language: English

Production
- Executive producers: Christopher Keenan; Adam Bonnet; Frederic Soulie
- Producer: Emory Ronald "Ron" Myrick
- Running time: 63 minutes
- Production companies: Mainframe Studios; Mattel Television

Original release
- Network: Netflix
- Release: August 20, 2021

Related
- Barbie: It Takes Two

Barbie: Big City, Big Dreams is a 2021 CGI-animated musical adventure buddy comedy film directed by Scott Pleydell-Pearce, produced by Emory Ronald "Ron" Myrick and written by Christopher Keenan and Catherine "Kate" Splaine.

First released in selected theaters in the United Kingdom and Ireland on August 20, 2021, before making its debut in the United States on Netflix on September 1, it is the 39th entry in the Barbie film series and the third to feature Barbie's family and/or friends based on Barbie Dreamhouse Adventures after Barbie: Princess Adventure and Barbie & Chelsea: The Lost Birthday. The film is accompanied by its eponymous soundtrack which was released on July 1, 2021, on global digital music streaming platforms.

On February 1, 2022, Mattel Television unveiled a CGI-animated serial adaptation and continuation of the film titled Barbie: It Takes Two. The first half of episodes was released in the U.S. on April 8 and other half on October 1.

== Official description ==
This film plot follows Barbie swapping the sunny shores of Malibu for the bright lights of Broadway to attend an exclusive summer performing arts program and meets... another Barbie! They become fast friends and discover they share more than just a name as they explore New York City and all its good-feeling features. As they compete for a coveted once-in-a-lifetime Spotlight Solo from Times Square, the friends discover that competition isn't all about winning, it's about striving to be your best, bringing the best out of others, overcoming doubts and sharing the spotlight.

== Plot ==
Barbie Roberts dreams of being a Broadway star, so she enrolls in a summer program at a prestigious performing Handler Arts Academy in New York City. Her family and friends back home in Malibu wish her well as she arrives at the academy. As Barbie struggles with her luggage, she gets helped by a flexible female student who is from Brooklyn. The academy's custodian informs them that they have shown up a day early, and tells them where the dormitory rooms are.

When Barbie and the girl from Brooklyn find a door with the name "Barbie Roberts" on it, they discover that they have the same name and will be roommates. They give themselves nicknames based on their location to avert future confusions with the two, respectively Malibu and Brooklyn. They bond over their love for music and become fast friends as they hang out and explore New York City.

On the subway, "Malibu" Barbie sees a poster of a popstar named Emmie and is a big fan, but "Brooklyn" Barbie says Emmie is an old childhood friend that she hasn't seen in a long time. The two "Barbie"-named girls then made a pact to not let stardom ruin their friendship. Meanwhile, at the Handler Arts Academy, Emmie appears in disguise so she can be treated like a normal student. Dean Morrison announces that the annual Spotlight Solo will be livestreamed from Times Square. Malibu and Brooklyn meet a costume student named Rafael (who wants to be known simply as Rafa) and his dog Gato. He gives them sequinned dresses that are supposed to sparkle, but the remote control he uses to light up the dresses malfunctions.

During her first week at the academy, "Malibu" Barbie struggles in all of her classes. Ken calls her to ask how she's doing, but she has mixed feelings. Later, the "Barbie"-named girls and Rafa discover that Emmie is attending the school in disguise. When they confronted her, Emmie explains that she lost contact with "Brooklyn" Barbie because of her strict manager-father. With this, Emmie and "Brooklyn" Barbie rekindle their friendship. The "Barbie"-named girls and Rafa then sworn to keep Emmie's disguise a secret.

The "Barbie"-named girls go to Central Park and donned on the dresses Rafa gave them. "Brooklyn" Barbie tells "Malibu" Barbie that her mother is a pilot and her father is worried about her. "Malibu" Barbie can relate because her father is also uneasy about her being in NYC. They take photos to send to their fathers, then dance and twirl in front of a fountain, making their dresses sparkle. Later, Emmie's father, Mr. Miller, comes to Handler Arts Academy to observe the students. He wants Emmie to have the Spotlight Solo, even though Emmie just wants to learn. Rafa records the class as Mr. Miller observes. While Malibu is dancing, she accidentally knocks "Brooklyn" Barbie into an orchestra pit. "Brooklyn" Barbie lands on a percussionist's drum and hurts her ankle.

"Malibu" Barbie feels sad about the accident, but she and her friends keep a positive attitude and share their struggles. According to a witness, Dean Morrison calls "Malibu" Barbie into a meeting and expels her from the academy for sabotaging "Brooklyn" Barbie, who would later be called by the dean to explain her expulsion. The two "Barbie"-named girls confront each other, break up their friendship and lament over it. Rafa and Emmie discover that Mr. Miller is behind the hullabaloo, leading the latter to confront her father, with Rafa forwarding his recorded class video to "Brooklyn" Barbie, who in turn shows it to Dean Morrison.

"Malibu" Barbie goes back home to California devastated about the thought of "Brooklyn" Barbie sabotaging her. With the truth and guilt feeling dawned on her after seeing it all for herself, Barbie decides to give up music. However, "Brooklyn" Barbie and her mother follows her home route to California so that the former can apologize to "Malibu" Barbie and bring her back to the academy. They reconciled and when they return to the academy, they find out they had obtained the Spotlight Solo. On the big night, the MC Emmie reveals her identity during the livestream and introduces the "Barbie"-named girls, who appear in their now-lit-up sequinned outfits Rafa gave them earlier and perform a song about their friendship journey (known as "See You at the Finish Line") while their family and friends watch live in Times Square. After their performance, Barbie "Malibu" and Barbie "Brooklyn" held each other's opposite hand high to signal their unison while fireworks go off above the Times Square's skyscrapers.

== Voice cast ==
The voice cast are follows:

- America Young as Barbie "Malibu" Roberts
- Amber May as Barbie "Brooklyn" Roberts
- Kirsten Day as Skipper / Anonymous Student
- Cassandra Morris as Stacie
- Cassidy Naber as Chelsea
- Ritesh Rajan as Ken / Anonymous Student
- Greg Chun as George
- Lisa Fuson as Margaret
- Desirae Whitfield as Nikki
- Cristina Milizia as Teresa / Anonymous Student
- Stephanie Sheh as Renee
- Emma Galvin as Daisy
- Alejandro Saab as Rafa
- Joshua Tomar as Mr. Miller
- Bernardo De Paula as Cab Driver
- Salli Saffioti as Female Custodian
- Giselle Fernandez as Emmie (nicknamed Lee)
- Dinora Walcott as Dean Morrison
- Gabe Kunda as Male opera singer
- Daniel M.K. Cohen as Percussionist

Other characters include the parents of Barbie "Brooklyn" Roberts and Rafael's dog Gato.

== Soundtrack ==
Barbie: Big City, Big Dreams (Official Motion Picture Soundtrack)

Soundtrack album by various artists
- Released: August 28, 2021
- Genre: Children's music
- Length: 14:21
- Label: Mattel–Arts Music
- Producers: Matthew Tishler; Andrew Underberg; Allison McDonald

As already mentioned, the film is accompanied by its eponymous soundtrack which was released on global digital music streaming platforms on July 1, 2021.

All tracks are written by Matthew Tishler, Andrew Underberg and Allison McDonald, except when noted.

No.	Title	Writer(s)	Length
1.	"Before Us"		1:45
2.	"Work It"		2:06
3.	"Good Vibes"		2:11
4.	"Playground Of Our Dreams"		2:47
5.	"See You at the Finish Line"		2:51
6.	"Big City, Big Dreams"	Underberg, McDonald	2:41
Total length:			14:21

== Promotion ==
An all-round marketing programme supported the launch of the film in the UK and Ireland where it was released in cinemas on August 20, 2021. Before the film's release, the official Barbie shop section of the Mattel website displayed a countdown banner towards the US Netflix release. British pop singer and DJ Fleur East hosted a virtual party to celebrate the film's debut on Pop in the UK & Ireland on October 22.

== Release ==
Aside the British and Irish theatrical and television release as well as the American Netflix debut, the film was also debuted on global kids' television channels on separate dates and times including Cartoonito in Italy, 9Go! in Australia, Neox Kids in Spain, Super RTL in Germany and Carousel in Russia and on streaming services via iQIYI in China.

== Television adaptation ==
On 1 February 2022, Mattel Television unveiled a CGI-animated television adaptation of the film titled Barbie: It Takes Two. Executives of Barbie: Big City, Big Dreams as well as Mainframe Studios reprise their roles in the series with the inclusion of Marsha Griffin (who previously wrote scripts for 3 Barbie films between 2015 and 2016 in Barbie in Princess Power, Barbie in Rock 'N Royals and Barbie: Spy Squad) as a creative producer.

The series debuted on television in Australia via 9Go! on March 4 and on Pop in the UK and Ireland on April 2 before launching on Netflix in the United States on April 8. The series also aired on YTV in Canada on April 10 and on Canal Panda in Portugal on April 17.

The American Netflix launch revealed two voice acting replacements; Barbie "Brooklyn" Roberts is voiced by Tatiana Varria instead of Amber May and Rafael/Rafa is voiced by Nicolas Roye instead of Alejandro Saab.

== See also ==
- List of Barbie films
