= You, Me & Her =

- Theatrical release poster
- Directed by: Dan Levy Dagerman
- Written by: Selina Ringel
- Produced by: Anna Campbell; Cameron Fife; Fernando Lebrija; Pablo Lebrija; Dan Levy Dagerman; Ritesh Rajan; Selina Ringel
- Starring: Ritesh Rajan; Selina Ringel; Sydney Park
- Cinematography: Michael Street
- Edited by: Joell Posey; Romina Rey
- Music by: Juan Carlos Enriquez
- Production companies: Two Hands Productions; Irreversible Pictures
- Distributed by: Attend; Two Hands Productions
- Release dates: July 2, 2023 (Dances with Films); February 14, 2025 (United States)
- Running time: 100 minutes
- Countries: Mexico; United States
- Language: English

You, Me & Her is a 2023 romantic comedy-drama film directed and produced by Dan Levy Dagerman. The film's plot follows a chronically married couple who flirts with a threesome to rediscover themselves.

The film premiered at the 2023 Dances With Films film festival and was released in the United States on February 14, 2025.

== Cast ==
- Ritesh Rajan as Ash
- Selina Ringel as Mags
- Sydney Park as Angela

== Reception ==
On the review aggregator website Rotten Tomatoes, 53% of 19 critics' reviews are positive, with an average rating of 5.4/10.

== Release ==
You, Me & Her was released in the United States on February 14, 2025.
