= Barbie & the Diamond Castle =

- DVD cover art
- Directed by: Gino Nichele
- Written by: Elana Lesser; Cliff Ruby
- Produced by: Nancy Bennett; Luke Carroll
- Starring: Kelly Sheridan; Cassidy Ladden; Maryke Hendrikse; Kathleen Barr; Jeremy From; Noel Johansen
- Edited by: Tim Jones
- Music by: Arnie Roth
- Production companies: Mattel Entertainment; Rainmaker Entertainment
- Distributed by: Universal Studios Home Entertainment (Note: Released under Entertainment Rights/Classic Media outside North America, with Right Entertainment distributing in the United Kingdom)
- Release dates: September 7, 2008 (Nickelodeon); September 9, 2008 (DVD)
- Running time: 78 minutes
- Countries: Canada; United States
- Language: English

Barbie & the Diamond Castle is a 2008 direct-to-video animated musical film directed by Gino Nichele and produced by Mattel Entertainment with Rainmaker Entertainment. It first premiered on Nickelodeon on September 7, 2008, and it was later released to DVD on September 9, 2008.

The thirteenth entry in the Barbie film series, the film features the voice of Kelly Sheridan as Barbie and the cover of the song "Connected" recorded by Katharine McPhee. It follows the story of Liana and Alexa (the in-universe roles of the dolls, Barbie and Teresa) on their journey to find the mysterious diamond castle.

== Plot ==
While Barbie and Teresa are playing music and writing a song together, Barbie’s sister Stacie storms in, having had a fight with her friend Courtney. Barbie and Teresa tell Stacie a story to teach her the power of friendship.

Liana and Alexa are two friends who share a love for music, and live in a cottage where they grow and sell flowers for a living, but have very little to eat. One day, they find two heart-shaped stones and make them into necklaces to symbolize their friendship. That evening, a storm occurs, destroying their garden. The next day, Liana offers her food to a poor, old woman who gives them a mirror in exchange. Later, the two hear a voice from the mirror and find a girl inside it named Melody. The trio bond over music and Melody teaches them a song; but they are soon attacked by a dragon named Slyder. They manage to escape him, but their cottage catches fire and burns down.

Melody explains that she was once the apprentice of the three Muses, Dori, Phaedra, and Lydia, who lived in the Diamond Castle. Lydia turned evil and planned to take the Diamond castle for herself. The other muses hid the castle and entrusted Melody with its key, but were turned to stone. Melody, fleeing Slyder, hid and inadvertently trapped herself inside the mirror. Melody tells Liana and Alexa that Lydia can be defeated if they play the Muses' instruments. Liana insists on helping Melody and Alexa reluctantly agrees. On their journey, Liana and Alexa adopt two puppies, naming them Sparkles and Lily. The girls are confronted by Lydia who orders them to hand over Melody. When they refuse, Lydia attempts to hypnotize them with her flute but they are shielded by the stones on their necklaces, which come from the Diamond Castle. The girls escape with the help of twins Ian and Jeremy who join them on their journey; but are separated when Liana and Alexa are carried off by a magic bridge.

Liana and Alexa arrive at a mansion and are greeted by its hosts who, hypnotized by Lydia, tell them that they are the mansion's prophesied owners. Alexa suggests abandoning their quest and remaining in the mansion, causing her and Liana to argue. Liana and Melody leave and Alexa angrily takes off her necklace, whereupon she is captured and hypnotized by Lydia. Liana and Melody are kidnapped by Slyder. Alexa is ordered to leap off a ledge if Melody does not surrender the castle's key. Melody agrees, to save her and Liana; but as she and Lydia leave, Slyder knocks them off the ledge anyway. Liana manages to hang on to the ledge and Alexa, before returning Alexa's necklace and breaking Lydia's spell.

After reconciling, Liana and Alexa reunite with the twins and go after Lydia. While the twins distract Slyder, Lydia creates a whirlpool and orders the girls to drown themselves; they feign being hypnotized, enabling Liana to grab Lydia’s flute. Lydia threatens to break the mirror, but Melody shatters it from within to stop her. The mirror is thrown into the whirlpool but is saved by Sparkles and Lily. When Lydia's flute drops in the water, she wades in to get it; but the waterlogged flute backfires and Lydia seemingly disappears.

Thinking the Diamond Castle can bring Melody back, the girls realize that the song Melody taught them is the key. They sing together and the Diamond Castle reappears. Stepping inside, Liana and Alexa are magically given new dresses and Melody is freed from the mirror. The girls enter the music room, but Lydia returns with Slyder. The three of them play the Muses' instruments and sing together, overpowering Lydia and turning her and Slyder to stone. The other Muses are freed and Lydia's spells are all undone. Liana and Alexa are crowned princesses of music and Melody becomes a Muse. Melody invites them to live in the castle, but they choose instead to return to their old life with their new pets. The Muses give the girls magic seeds that restore their garden, and Jeremy and Ian become musicians.

Back to the present, Stacie goes to apologize to Courtney while Barbie and Teresa happily resume playing music.

== Characters ==
- Kelly Sheridan as Barbie/Princess Liana – Barbie stars as Princess Liana, a peasant girl/princess of music who shares a cottage in the forest with her best friend Alexa. Liana is loyal and brave. She's not afraid of tricky situations (except for thunder and lightning) and she loves to sing.
- Cassidy Ladden as Teresa/Princess Alexa – Teresa also stars as Princess Alexa, a gardener/princess of music who lives in a cottage with Liana. They are best friends, though Alexa often wishes that they could live in grand style, so they won't have to worry about anything. She believes in magic, and she has a silly sense of humor. She has a beautiful singing voice.
- Maryke Hendrikse as Melody (Played by Summer) – Melody used to be an apprentice to the two Muses of Music who live in the Diamond Castle. She was trapped inside the magic mirror while trying to hide from Lydia. She loves to sing in harmony with Princesses Liana and Alexa.
- Jeremy From as Jeremy and Noel Johansen as Ian (Both played by Ken) – Jeremy and Ian are love interests to Liana and Alexa, they are identical twin musicians at an inn, after befriending Liana and Alexa, they end up joining them on their quest to find diamond castle and help them battle with Lydia.
- Kathleen Barr as Lydia – Lydia is an evil former Muse and current sorceress who wants Diamond Castle for herself, with the intention of making it gloomy. She plays her flute to use her evil spells. She is the main antagonist.
- Mark Acheson as Slyder – Slyder is a clumsy, flying serpent and assistant of Lydia. He is the second antagonist.
- Veena Sood as Sparkles/Lily – Sparkles, a cocker spaniel pup, and Lily, West highland terrier pup, are a pair of adorable puppies. Liana and Alexa adopt them while on their journey to the Diamond Castle.
- Nicole Oliver as Dori and Heather Doerksen as Phaedra – The Muses of Music, who reside in the Diamond Castle and are gifted with magical musical abilities. Though there are only two of them, their numbers originally included Lydia, who cast a spell that turned all the residents in the Diamond Castle to stone.

== Cast ==
- Kelly Sheridan as Barbie/Princess Liana
- Melissa Lyons as Barbie/Princess Liana (singing)
- Cassidy Ladden as Teresa/Princess Alexa (speaking/singing)
- Maryke Hendrikse as Melody
- Lara Janine as Melody (singing)
- Jeremy From as Prince Jeremy
- Noel Johansen as Prince Ian
- Kathleen Barr as Lydia
- Mark Acheson as Slyder
- Veena Sood as Sparkles/Lily
- Chantal Strand as Stacie
- Scott McNeil as Troll
- Nicole Oliver as Dori/Maid
- Heather Doerksen as Phaedra/Waitress
- Michael Dobson as Innkeeper
- Ron Halder as Butler
- Linda Sorenson as Old Woman

== Soundtrack ==
Barbie and the Diamond Castle: Original Movie Soundtrack

Soundtrack album by various artists
- Released: September 2, 2008
- Recorded: 2008
- Genres: Showtune, pop, teen pop, pop rock, acoustic
- Label: Koch Records

=== Track listing ===
A soundtrack for the film was released on September 2, 2008. The soundtrack's track list is as follows:

1. "Connected"
2. "Two Voices, One Song"
3. "We're Gonna Find It"
4. "Believe"
5. "Two Voices, One Song (Movie Version)"
6. "Wonderful Me"
7. "We're Gonna Find It (Movie Version)"
8. "Double Vision"
9. "Connected"
10. "I Need to Know" (Bonus Track)
11. "Shine" (Bonus Track)
12. "I'm On My Way" (Bonus Track)

== Reception ==
Barbie & the Diamond Castle was ranked as the eighth best film in the Barbie franchise by Polygon. The film is widely considered to be the most sapphic in the franchise amongst fans, due to intimate friendship between the two main female characters.

== See also ==
- List of Barbie animated films
- Barbie (media franchise)
- Barbie as the Princess and the Pauper
- Barbie as the Island Princess
- Barbie and the Secret Door
