= Femke Wolting =

Dutch new media producer

Femke Wolting (pronounced [ˈfɛmkə ˈʋɔltɪŋ]; born 6 November 1970 in Ouder-Amstel, The Netherlands) is a Dutch independent new media producer.

== Background ==
Together with Bruno Felix, Femke Wolting is founder and managing director of Submarine, an independent film, television and transmedia production company, spanning features, documentaries and animation. Submarine boasts a roster of award-winning productions made in collaboration with an extensive network of internationally acclaimed creators.

Wolting has produced films, series and transmedia projects across the globe, from the US and China, to Abu Dhabi, Russia and Mexico. Wolting and Felix are experienced in coordinating international co-productions, and collaborating with co-producers, broadcasters and distributors including VPRO, BBC, HBO, ZDF, Arte, and Channel 4.

Submarine's productions regularly premiere In Competition at major international film festivals and have received numerous awards, including an Emmy, the Prix Europa, NHK Japan Prize, Peabody Award, and the SXSW Interactive Award. Wolting has produced numerous acclaimed documentaries, narrative features, and television series, including Nobody Speak: Trials of the Free Press, which premiered at Sundance and was acquired as a Netflix Original, the Sundance award winning Winnie, a film based on the life of Winnie Mandela, the Emmy Award-winning feature Last Hijack, and the global animated series WellieWishers for Mattel/Amazon. She produced the ground-breaking and Emmy nominated citizen-journalism documentary Bellingcat: Truth in a Post-Truth World and Undone, Amazon's first adult animated series from BoJack Horseman creator/showrunner Raphael Bob-Waksberg, which premiered in September 2019. Submarine produced Where Is Anne Frank, a film loosely inspired by the life of Anne Frank.

Since 1999, Wolting has directed documentaries, such as It's The End Of TV As We Know It – a feature documentary about the future of television; Sneakers – an award-winning film about the rise of the sports shoe; and Viktor & Rolf: "Because We Are Worth It" – which followed a year in the lives of avant-garde fashion designers Viktor & Rolf. Together with Tommy Pallota, she produced and directed Last Hijack, an Emmy Award-winning hybrid animation/live action film about the pirates of Somalia that opened the Panorama Program at the Berlin Film Festival. The two teamed up again to direct More Human Than Human, a documentary about the state of artificial intelligence which recently won at the prestigious Life Sciences Film Festival in Prague.

As a producer and director, Wolting has worked with renowned directors such as Peter Greenaway.

== Filmography ==
=== Producer ===
- Rembrandt's J'accuse
- My Second Life
- Kika & Bob
- Eisenstein in Guanajuato
- American Jail
- Bellingcat - Truth in a Post-Truth World
- Undone
- Collapsus
- Nobody Speak: Trials of the Free Press
- Winnie
- Hans Joachim Klein: my life as a terrorist
- It's the end of TV as we know it
- Collapsus (nominated for an Emmy)
- Last Hijack (Emmy)
- Unspeak
- Ascent from Akeron

=== Director ===
- Another Perfect World
- Viktor & Rolf
- Sneakers
- Beyond MTV
- It's the end of TV as we know it
