= Aydrea Walden =

American actress

- Occupations: Actress; writer; producer
- Years active: 2003–present

Aydrea Walden is an Emmy-nominated American screenwriter, television writer, and actress best known for the series Black Girl in a Big Dress.

Walden's writing credits include iCarly, Eureka!, Barbie: It Takes Two, and Ada Twist: Scientist for which she was nominated for the Children and Family Emmy Award for Outstanding Writing for a Preschool Animated Program. Walden also created, wrote, and starred in the Webby Award-nominated series Black Girl in a Big Dress. She has worked in various animation production departments on the films The Croods, Home, and How to Train Your Dragon: The Hidden World. Walden also performs, appearing in her one-woman show, The Oreo Experience: A Total Whitey Trapped in a Black Chick's Body, the short film Sci-Fi 60, and the episode "Chapter 4: Sanctuary" of The Mandalorian. She has also contributed episodes for Thomas & Friends: All Engines Go.

Walden also enjoys historical costuming and part of the inspiration for Black Girl in a Big Dress was the lack of representation of African-Americans in period dramas, and related shows. Walden has stated that “There’s still an assumption that ‘black’ stories must be very serious or very dramatic, or about struggle, but black people also have fun and play around and love romantic comedies and do all the goofy things that white people do. Black Girl in a Big Dress has fun with one of those goofy things.”

In 2020 and 2021, the Science Fiction and Fantasy Writers of America named Walden toastmaster for the annual Nebula Awards, which were moved on-line due to the COVID-19 pandemic.

Walden was a Chips Quinn Scholar and earned a degree in journalism from the University of Texas at Austin.
