= Katie Crown =

Canadian voice actress and television writer (born 1985)

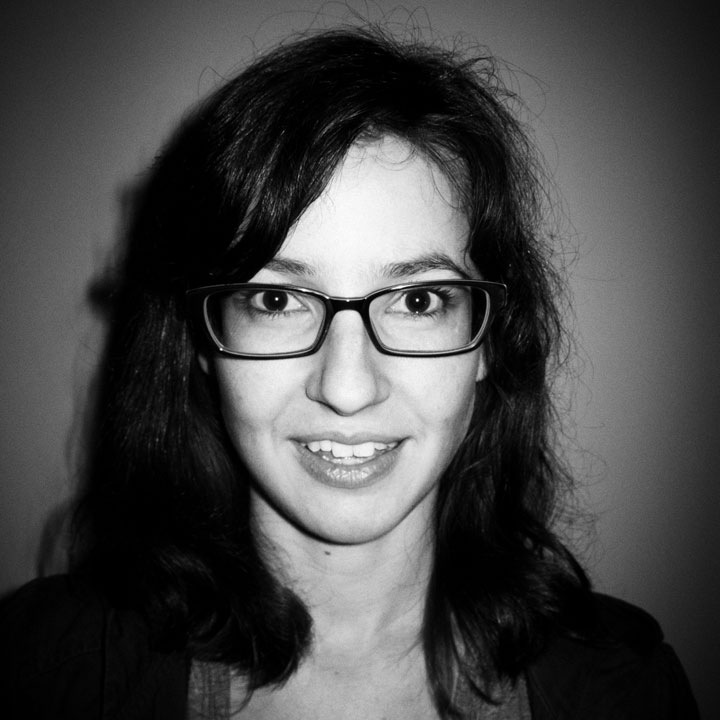
- Crown in 2012
- Born: Katherine Crown; April 9, 1985 (age 41); Oakville, Ontario, Canada
- Citizenship: Canada; United States
- Occupations: Voice actress; television writer
- Years active: 2004–present

Katherine Crown (born April 9, 1985) is a Canadian voice actress and television writer best known for providing the voice of Izzy on the Fresh TV reality comedy series Total Drama (2007–13), a role she reprised on Total DramaRama (2018–23), and Tulip in the comedy film Storks (2016), the latter of which earned her a nomination for the Annie Award for Outstanding Achievement for Voice Acting in a Feature Production.

Crown is also known for voicing Fin McCloud on the Fresh TV teen comedy series Stoked (2009–13), Mary Wendle and Melanie Baker on the Cartoon Network adventure comedy series Clarence (2014–18), and Ivy Sundew on the Disney Channel adventure fantasy comedy series Amphibia (2019–22). She voiced Harley on the Fox sitcom series Bob's Burgers (2014–present) for seasons 4–10 (Ashley Nicole Black has voiced Harley since The Bob's Burgers Movie in 2022), and has been a member of the show’s writing staff since 2019.

== Early life ==
Crown was born on April 9, 1985 in Oakville, Ontario to Carol (née Figg) and David Crown.

== Career ==
In 2013, automotive financing company DriveTime hired Crown, along with Nicole Randall Johnson, for an advertising campaign called DriveTime Girls. The actresses portrayed a comically eccentric duo of mobile credit approval agents who dealt with "rescuing" potential car buyers rejected for financing by other automotive dealers. The campaign ran from late 2013 throughout 2014.

== Filmography ==
=== Animation ===
List of voice performances in animation
Year	Title	Role	Notes	Source
2007–2013	Total Drama	Izzy		
2009–11	Kid vs. Kat	Estelle		
2009–11	Jimmy Two-Shoes	Aunty Pomegranate, Mama Bird, Mrs. Panda Monster		
2009–2013	Stoked	Fin McCloud		
2009–2010	Spliced	Patricia		
2010, 2012	Skatoony	Izzy	Episodes: "Pirates" and "Trash Talk"	
2012–2015	Barbie: Life in the Dreamhouse	Teresa		
2013	Barbie in the Pink Shoes	Hailey		
2013	Adventure Time	Blargetha		
2013	Sanjay and Craig	—N/a	Writer	
2014–2018	Clarence	Mary, Ms. Baker, others	Also writer	
2014	Barbie: The Pearl Princess	Kuda		
2014–2016	American Dad!	Tina, Nurse, Audience Member, Samantha, Meredith's Assistant, additional voices		
2014–2020	Bob's Burgers	Harley, others	Voiced Harley seasons 4-10; replaced by Ashley Nicole Black in 2022. Also staff writer (from 2019)	
2016	Star vs. the Forces of Evil	N/A	Writer of "Mr. Candle Cares"	
2016	Storks	Tulip	Nominated – Annie Award for Voice Acting in a Feature Production	
2017–2019	Too Loud	Fan Girl		
2018–2023	Total DramaRama	Izzy		
2019–2022	Amphibia	Ivy Sundew		
2020–2022	Cleopatra in Space	Akila		
2020	Wild Help	Dandy, Bebe, Yeti Mom	Pilot	
2022	My Butt Has a Fever	Additional voices		
2022	The Bob's Burgers Movie	Additional voices	Also executive producer	
2023	Kiff	Pawva Mugg		
2026	Strawberry Vampire	Nancy		

=== Live-action ===
List of acting performances in television
Year	Title	Role	Notes	Source
2007	The Jon Dore Television Show	Narrator	Ep. "STD"	
2009	Hotbox		Also writer and story editor	
2012	Conan	Audience Member	Ep. "MELF Hunters 3: North Polin'"	
2013	The Nerdist Podcast			
2013	Nathan for You		Also writer, producer, and consultant	
2014–2015	Kroll Show	Angela Mackenzie-Ng	Recurring guest star (three episodes)	
