= WellieWishers (TV series) =

- Based on: American Girl doll franchise
- Written by: Valerie Tripp
- Directed by: Bouwine Pool; Wip Vernooij; Anneke de Graaf; Dario van der Vree
- Voices of: Ashley Gebhard; Lola Salsbury Lipson; Yasmine Wright-Capers; Dana Heath; Lily Sanfelippo
- Countries of origin: United States; Netherlands
- Original language: English
- No. of seasons: 2
- No. of episodes: 30

Production
- Executive producer: Christopher Keenan
- Producers: Denise Green; Bruno Felix; Femke Wolting
- Running time: 11 minutes
- Production companies: Mattel Creations; Submarine Studios

Original release
- Network: Amazon Prime Video
- Release: September 8, 2016 – May 20, 2017

WellieWishers is an animated web series based on the American Girl doll franchise. The series premiered on September 8, 2016 on Amazon Prime Video in the United States and Spain, and subsequently aired on Televisa, plus Tiny Pop in the United Kingdom. The series is co-produced by Mattel Creations and Submarine Studios B.V. and animated by Jam Filled Entertainment.

The series features five young girls: Willa, Camille, Emerson, Kendall and Ashlyn. Each girl wears a pair of colourful Wellington boots as they play in Willa's Aunt Miranda's garden.

== Characters ==
- Ashlyn (voiced by Dana Heath): The group's party planner and the most socially-active among the girls.
- Camille (voiced by Ashley Gebhard): A caring young girl and a good listener, who has an affinity for the ocean and other aquatic interests.
- Emerson (voiced by Lola Salsbury Lipson): The theatrically-inclined member of the group, enjoying the stage and performing in front of her friends through her self-written poems and songs.
- Kendall (voiced by Yasmine Wright-Capers): The group's artist and designer, having a gift for arts, crafts, and recycling old or discarded things.
- Willa (voiced by Lily Sanfelippo): A tree-climber and nature lover who has an interest in the outdoors, making friends with animals, and being fluent in "rabbit language".

== Episodes ==
=== Season 1 (2016) ===
1. The Bothersome Bird
2. Little Tree
3. Snow-flaking
4. Copy Cat
5. Butterfly Ballet
6. Glowing in the Dark
7. I Do, You, Hair-Do
8. Now You See It, Now You Don't
9. It Takes Two to See-Saw
10. Coloriffic Scavenger Hunt
11. Ashlyn's Tall Tale
12. Anything for a Laugh
13. The Rainmakers
14. Kendall Rules The Roost
15. All Time Favorites
16. Out of Line
17. Camille's Poem
18. Honking In A Winter Wonderland
19. All's Wellie That Ends Wellie
20. Duck, Duck, Oops!
21. Truth Or Hare
22. Honey, I Spoiled The Bunny
23. Owie Zowie
24. The Party That Blew Away
25. Mighty Girl
26. The Importance of Being Ashlyn

=== Season 2 (2017) ===
1. Bearfoot
2. Snail Race
3. Ants in My Plants
4. Twinsies
5. Garden Party
6. Outfox the Fox
7. Wishing Wellies
8. For the Love of It
9. Camping Catastrophe
10. Cocoa Celebration
11. You Can't Handle the Tooth
12. Team Mystery
13. Muddy Buddies
