= Barbie Dolphin Magic =

2017 Barbie television film

- Promotional artwork
- Written by: Jennifer Skelly
- Directed by: Conrad Helten
- Starring: Erica Lindbeck; Shannon Chan-Kent; Kazumi Evans; Claire Corlett; Ciana Swales; Adrian Petriw; Maryke Hendrikse; Paul Dobson; Garry Chalk
- Music by: Rebecca Kneubuhl
- Countries of origin: United States; Canada
- Original language: English

Production
- Producers: Sarah Serata; Rachel Datello
- Editor: Cassandra Simonds
- Running time: 63 minutes
- Production companies: Rainmaker Studios; Mattel Creations

Original release
- Network: YTV
- Release: September 17, 2017
- Network: Netflix
- Release: September 18, 2017

Barbie Dolphin Magic or Barbie: Dolphin Magic is a 2017 CGI-animated adventure television film directed by Conrad Helten and written by Jennifer Skelly that premiered on YTV in Canada on September 17 and the following day on Netflix in the United States and globally.

The 36th entry in the Barbie film series and the backdoor pilot to Barbie Dreamhouse Adventures, it features the voice of Erica Lindbeck for the final time as Barbie and is the only Barbie film to be produced by Mainframe Studios under the name of "Rainmaker Studios" following internal business structure reorganization after consolidation into a division of WOW! Unlimited Media. This marks the first time a Barbie film has neither premiered on American television nor distributed by Universal Pictures, although Universal did release DVD, video on demand and Digital HD copies of the film.

The film was dedicated to the memory of Canadian production editor David Hall, who died in a car accident a few months prior to the release of the film.

== Plot ==
A mermaid and her four dolphin companions hide from a ship. The youngest dolphin, named Emerald, curiously goes near the boat and is instantly captured as a rare "gemstone dolphin", as there is a mysterious woman offering a reward for these. The mermaid tells the dolphins to stay put and sets off in pursuit of the boat.

Meanwhile, Ken has taken an internship at a marine biology institute, and has arranged for Barbie and her sisters to stay in a beachside cabin nearby. While scuba diving, Skipper notices a strange animal heading towards the institute, and they follow it in the boat. Upon arrival, they find the perfectly healthy dolphin imprisoned in a cove modified into a recovery tank. Ken concludes that Emerald must have accidentally gotten in when the gate was open. Marlo, the institute's director, stops them from letting Emerald out, saying she has to wait until a vet can see him per protocol.

Once the group leaves, the 'animal' appears and reveals itself as the mermaid, who magically turns her tail to legs and tries to free the dolphin herself; however, Marlo has locked the gate. Barbie spots her, and tells her what Marlo said. The mermaid introduces herself as Isla, and reluctantly agrees to trust Barbie and return next afternoon when the Vet is supposed to be there. The sisters offer her a bed in the cabin, and she proceeds to amuse and puzzle them with her lack of experience with such simple concepts as mattresses, toothbrushes, sisters, dogs, and even sandwiches.

The next day, Emerald's family Ruby, Topaz, and Amethyst show up, and Isla reveals her secret to Barbie while swearing her to silence about it, which Barbie agrees to keep on condition that Isla teach her how to swim like a mermaid. They hear Emerald's cries through a cave and realize there is an underwater tunnel from the bay into the cove. Isla and the Dolphins try to find the way through to free Emerald, but the cave system is too complex and they have to give up. Meanwhile, Stacie, Chelsea, and Skipper see a sideshow company's helicopter land at the institute, and when they follow it they learn that Marlo intends to sell Emerald to the owner.

The dolphins disobey Isla and head for the cove. Marlo has Ken open the gate and then close it behind them on the pretext that they will help reduce Emerald's stress level. Ken suspects something is off, and when the rest arrive after Marlo leaves, he realizes the truth and goes to open the gate; however, Marlo has already changed the code.

Skipper and Chelsea hatch a plan to hack into Marlo's key fob device for locking the gate, which succeeds, but Marlo changes the code again and destroys the device. Isla dives into the cove, reveals herself as a mermaid to the rest of the group, and hides the dolphins in the caves. Marlo, thinking they got out through the gate, sets off in the helicopter. Isla gives Barbie a magic shell, Barbie goes to the other end of the tunnel in the bay and uses it to create a signal that Isla can follow to help the dolphins escape. They make their way to Ken's motorboat, but Marlo spots them in the bay and gives chase in the helicopter. Barbie disguises herself as a mermaid and swims the other way, allowing Marlo to pursue and capture her while the rest make it to safety. Once Marlo realizes her mistake, she lets Barbie go, but Barbie tells her she plans to go to Marlo's superiors and the authorities about the dolphin poaching.

Later, once the area is safe, Barbie uses the shell to summon Isla back to the beach while the dolphins play offshore. Barbie dubs Isla her "sister of the sea" and they vow to always remain friends.

== Cast ==
- Erica Lindbeck as Barbie
- Shannon Chan-Kent as Isla
- Kazumi Evans as Skipper Roberts
- Claire Corlett as Stacie Roberts
- Ciana Swales as Chelsea Roberts
- Adrian Petriw as Ken
- Maryke Hendrikse as Marlo
- Paul Dobson as Hugo
- Garry Chalk as Pete

Other characters include Isla's Gemstone dolphin companions; Emerald, Topaz, Amethyst and Ruby, and Barbie's puppies; Taffy, Honey, Rookie and DJ.

== See also ==
- List of Barbie films
