= Barbie: Star Light Adventure =

2016 Barbie adventure film

- Theatrical release poster
- Directed by: Andrew Tan; Michael Goguen (supervision); Collette Sunderman (voice)
- Written by: Kacey Arnold; Kate Boutilier (additional)
- Story by: Kristopher Fogel (supervision)
- Produced by: Cella Duffy; Sarah Serata; Julia Pistor (executive); Peter Escarcega (associate)
- Starring: Erica Lindbeck; Kimberly Woods; Robbie Daymond; Sarah Anne Williams; Michael Chandler; Dwight Schultz; Ben Bledsoe; Jonathan Lipow; Lucien Dodge
- Narrated by: Laura Post
- Edited by: Eric White
- Music by: Toby Chu
- Production companies: Arc Productions; Mattel Creations
- Distributed by: Fathom Events (Limited theatrical release); Universal Pictures Home Entertainment (Home video)
- Release dates: July 30, 2016 (theatrical); August 29, 2016 (home video); October 2, 2016 (television)
- Running time: 79 minutes
- Countries: United States; Canada
- Language: English
- Box office: $1.2 million

Barbie: Star Light Adventure is a 2016 CGI-animated adventure children's film directed by Andrew Tan and written by Kacey Arnold with assistance by Kate Boutilier and story supervision by Kristopher Fogel. The 33rd entry in the Barbie film series, it was also the first Barbie film under Mattel's new company, Mattel Creations, and also to feature the fashion doll's brand message sequence as part of the film's intro. The film was first given a 24-hour limited theatrical release by Fathom Events on 30 July before its debut both on home video by Universal Pictures Home Entertainment on 29 August and on American television via Nickelodeon on 2 October. Mattel released related merchandise in addition to the film.

== Plot ==
The narrator explains that a prophecy has foretold that someday the stars will cease their cosmic dance and go out, unless "The One" can start them glowing again and restore order to the galaxy. This prophecy is starting to come true, and the sky is getting darker. The rigidly organized and disciplined King Constantine, who still believes despite many failures that he must be "The One", hatches his latest plan for proving himself and starts recruiting young people to help.

On the distant wildlife preserve planet of Para-Den, Barbie is an enthusiastic if impetuous Hoverboarder, who also can communicate with animals and objects using telekinetic powers. She is afraid to accept Constantine's invitation, but her widowed father convinces her to try, and she travels to the Capital Planet.

At a great ball, King Constantine introduces Barbie to the rest of the team he has assembled – Sal-Lee, a sarcastic and competitive Hoverboarder who is also a speedster; the socially awkward and naïve Prince Leo who is the best pilot in the galaxy; and the kindhearted alien sisters Kareena and Sheena, who have a psychic connection and also possess the ability to manipulate gravity to make things lighter or heavier, respectively. Sal-Lee forces Leo to attempt to dance a waltz at the ball, and he is humiliated – Barbie sympathetically starts a rave so he can dance his own way, but Constantine sees it as disorderly and puts a stop to it. Later, Barbie and Sal-Lee stay up past curfew and start to bond over a shared loneliness and fear of losing the rest of the stars.

Constantine explains his plan to discover the center of the galaxy and use a machine to zap the stars into order. He then sends Barbie and Sal-Lee on a hoverboard race through a course designed to see which is better able to take the twins through the gravity-related obstacles, but when Barbie spots danger, she convinces the twins and Sal-Lee to work together with her, also using her powers to save Sal-Lee from falling debris. Constantine is impressed, but also worried that Barbie keeps defying his orders. When she stays up past curfew again to help a distressed animal, he lectures her on the importance of following a plan in an emergency.

Things come to a head when he sends the group on a mission to capture a Starlian creature as part of their training. They succeed through dance, but Barbie senses the creature's terror and distress and convinces the others to let it go, thinking Constantine wants it in a zoo. Constantine, furious at being both disobeyed and misjudged, fires Barbie on the spot; he needed the Starlian to navigate to the center of the Galaxy to save the stars. Barbie apologizes for her incorrect assumptions, but not for doing what she thought was right, and uses her telekinesis to summon the Starlian and ask it nicely for help. Constantine reluctantly bows under the pressure of her teammates to reinstate her, now as their leader.

Constantine and the team set off to the center of the Galaxy, guided and protected by the Starlian. Leo pilots them skillfully to the central planet. Once there, Barbie, Sal-Lee, Sheena, and Kareena fly through the gravity-related obstacles and clear a path for Constantine and his machine. They find their way to the planet's core where the avatars of the stars reside, and Constantine, stubbornly disregarding Barbie's advice to listen and reevaluate the situation, uses his device as planned. All the stars, forced into rigid order, instantly go out. Barbie, who could sense the stars were ceasing their dance out of sadness and loneliness, starts a new dance with them to cheer them up, and restores their order and light to the Galaxy, proving herself "the One".

On the way home, Constantine humbly tells Barbie that while their personalities are irrevocably different, the two of them should stop working against each other and begin to learn from each other. He takes her and her father in as his wards, and the film ends with Barbie, now as Princess Starlight, and her friends teaching Constantine how to dance at a rave.

== Cast ==
- Erica Lindbeck as Barbie (Princess Starlight)
- Robbie Daymond as Prince Leo
- Kimberly Woods as Sal-Lee
- Sarah Anne Williams as Sheena / Kareena / Sprites
- Michael Chandler as Barbie's Dad
- Dwight Schultz as King Constantine
- Lucien Dodge as Pupcorn
- Laura Post as Narrator
- Ben Bledsoe as Artemis
- Jonathan Lipow as Starlian

== See also ==
- List of Barbie films
