= Planet Heroes =

Toy line by Fisher-Price

Planet Heroes was a line of toys from Fisher-Price depicting various heroic characters each identified with a specific planet.

These characters represented their planets in design and features, such as Mercury and Pluto are very small, while Jupiter is a larger toy. The toys representing the planets have numbers on them corresponding with the number of planets from the Sun they are (Mercury is 1, Venus is 2, Earth is 3, etc). A few of the Planet Heroes toys were released in a basic model that comes with a smaller accessory. These include the Earth Ace with Skateboard instead of Go Kart and the Mars Digger with Drill and shield instead of Rumble Rover.

== Heroes ==
=== Original Characters ===
- Mercury Zip - Accessories are a small gun and a 2-wheeled vehicle, that when rolled back will zip forward.
- Venus Dazzle is the only female character in the toy line. Her accessory is a lava launch gun.
- Earth Ace Earth Ace Basic Earth Ace come with a Go Kart, the basic figure comes with a skateboard with wings.
- Mars Digger comes with a Rumble Rover vehicle. The basic version comes with a drill and shield.
- Jupiter Gustus - The largest Planet Hero can spin 360 degrees. He comes with a pet robot dog.
- Saturn Rings - Saturn comes with a Ring vehicle.
- Uranus Yuri comes with a suction cup gun. He also has 3 suction cups on the bottom of each foot.
- Neptune Tune is filled with a liquid and comes with a large vehicle.
- Pluto Shiver is the smallest planet hero and comes with a large snowmobile.
- Star Shooter comes with a star surfboard.
- Moon Lunar comes with a small Moon buggy.
- Sun Commander is a larger toy and comes with a small bird that rests on his shoulder.

=== Voice Comm Characters ===
Voice Comm characters are versions of the original characters that have different accessories and speak a few phrases.

- Voice Comm Sun Commander comes with a Sun Staff.
- Voice Comm Earth Ace comes with a dog.
- Voice Comm Mars Digger comes with a dog.
- Voice Comm Jupiter comes with a gun.

=== Metallic Squad Characters ===
Metallic Squad characters are a second line of planet heroes toys that took most of the original heroes and gave them a metallic uniform and new accessories."

The character Star Hollywood is unique to the Metallic Squad line. Metallic squad characters for Sun Commander, Mars Digger, and Jupiter Gustus have not been released.

- Metallic Mercury Zip has a hover vehicle.
- Metallic Venus Dazzle has a larger lava gun.
- Metallic Earth has comes with a Jet Pack.
- Metallic Moon Lunar comes with a Moon buggy.
- Metallic Saturn Rings comes with a Ring Gun.
- Metallic Uranus Yuri comes with a suction gun and a small gun.
- Neptune Tune comes with a small sea serpent.
- Pluto Shiver comes with a Plutonian Polar Bear with a cannon.
- Metallic Star Shooter comes with a surf board and disc gun.
- Metallic Star Hollywood comes with a motorcycle.

=== Creature Squad, Space Patrol, and Space Shooter ===
- Space Patrol Mercury Zip has slight color differentiations from metallic squad Mercury Zip. Product #P8450
- Space Shooter Venus Dazzle has no discernible difference from the metallic squad version. Product #P8454
- Space Patrol Earth Ace has slight color variations from Metallic Squad Earth Ace. Product #P8448
- Creature Squad Earth Ace is packaged with a silver dog that looks exactly like Jupiter Gustus' dog. Product #P8446
- Space Patrol Moon Lunar has slight color variations from Metallic Squad Moon Lunar. Product #P8449
- Space Shooter Saturn Rings has slight color variations from Metallic Squad Saturn Rings. Product #P8456
- Space Shooter Uranus Yuri has slight color variations from Metallic Squad Uranus Yuri. Product #P8453
- Creature Squad Neptune comes with a sea serpent. Product#: P8443
- Creature Squad Pluto comes with a plutonian polar bear. Product #P8444
- There are slight color variations between Space Shooter Star Shooter and Metallic Squad Star Shooter. Product #P8455
- Space Patrol Star Hollywood has no discernible difference from the Metallic Squad version. Product #P8451

All of these items were released in 2009. Just like the metallic squad, Mars Digger and Jupiter Gustus are left out. This product line seems to mostly be a repackaging of the Metallic Squad.

== Villains ==
=== Original Characters ===
The characters Photon and Neutron are sold in a set with Professor Darkness.

- Professor Darkness comes with Photon and Neutron.
- Photon Comet
- Neutron Comet
- Tiny asteroid comes with an asteroid boulder and a launcher.

=== Voice Comm Characters ===
The Voice Comm toys are versions of the characters that have different accessories and speak a few phrases. Red Giant Slash is Unique to the Voice Comm line.

- Voice Comm Professor Darkness Black Hole Voice Comm Professor Darkness comes with a Neutrino Ray, and a hand held ray gun.
- Voice Comm Red Giant Slash comes with a gun.
- Voice Comm Tiny Asteroid Voice Comm Tiny Asteroid comes with a small asteroid figure.

== Accessories ==
- Solar Quarters: This is a play set designed for the planet heroes toys.
- Turbo Shuttle: This is a spaceship designed for the planet heroes. It has two secondary spaceships that can break off of the main ship in battle.
- Voice Comm Jet: This jet features voice comm technology and seats 1 planet heroes character.
- Moon Buggy: This land vehicle has room for 2 characters (1 in driving, 1 on back).
- The Planet Heroes Smart Cycle Game

== Special Sets ==
- Earth Ace Special Edition Set: This set includes Voice Comm. Earth Ace and his puppy, DVD, skateboard, and exclusive motorcycle, not found in any other sets.
- Ultimate Professor Darkness Gift Set: This set includes Voice Comm. Professor Darkness, Photon and Neutron, DVD, Neutrino Ray, and exclusive Space Blaster and Mini Sub only found in this set.

== Comic book/DVD ==
Three DVD episodes and comic books have been released for the Planet Heroes. The DVD episodes are approx. 16 minutes.

- Comic/DVD #1 Ace in Space
- Comic/DVD #2 Here Comes the Sun
- Comic/DVD #3 The Ace that Jumped Over the Moon

== Trading Cards ==
Every planet hero action figure comes with a trading card that on the front contain a picture of the character and on the back have facts about the planet and the planet hero.

== Action Figure Availability ==
The planet Heroes toy line was officially discontinued in late 2009. The most difficult toys to find are Voice Comm Sun Commander and Pluto Shiver.
