= Barbie Dreamhouse Adventures =

Animated television series (2018–2020)

- Also known as: Barbie: Dreamhouse Adventures; Dreamhouse Adventures; Barbie Dreamhouse Adventures: Go Team Roberts! (seasons 4 & 5)
- Genre: Comedy; Adventure; Children/Family
- Based on: Barbie's family and friends by Mattel
- Directed by: Various
- Voices of: America Young; Kirsten Day; Cassandra Lee Morris; Cassidy Naber; Ritesh Rajan; Lisa Fuson; Greg Chun; Desirae Whitfield; Cristina Milizia; Stephanie Sheh; Emma Galvin; Johnny Yong Bosch; Eamon Brennan
- Theme music composer: The Math Club
- Opening theme: "Barbie Dreamhouse Adventures Theme Song"
- Ending theme: "Barbie Dreamhouse Adventures Theme Song" (instrumental)
- Composers: The Math Club; Benjamin Roberts
- Countries of origin: United States; Canada
- Original language: English
- No. of seasons: 5
- No. of episodes: 52

Production
- Executive producers: Christopher Keenan; Julia Pistor (seasons 1–3)
- Running time: 24 minutes (per episode)
- Production companies: Mainframe Studios; Mattel Television (Note: Credited as Mattel Creations for seasons 1–3.)

Original release
- Network: Netflix (U.S.); YTV (Canada)
- Release: May 4, 2018 – April 22, 2020

Related
- Barbie: Life in the Dreamhouse; See below for film adaptations

Barbie Dreamhouse Adventures, Barbie: Dreamhouse Adventures or just Dreamhouse Adventures, is a CGI-animated adventure comedy children's television series released between 3 May 2018 and 12 April 2020 on Netflix in the United States, while it debuted on YTV in Canada on 22 June 2018.

Created to complement the Barbie Dreamtopia web-based franchise, this series is rather centered on the activities and adventures of Barbie, her sisters, other family members and friends, and it follows up from the 2017 film, Barbie: Dolphin Magic. The 4th and 5th seasons of the series were referred to on-screen as Barbie Dreamhouse Adventures: Go Team Roberts! After completion of its Netflix run, the series got adapted into 4 television films which featured a portion of the core family and friends going along with Barbie on certain adventures.

== Background ==
According to Mattel's then-chief content officer, (CCO), Catherine Balsam Schwaber, and senior vice president of content development & production, Christopher Keenan, the series was in response to children wanting to know more about the iconic character, her sisters and her entire family and friends.

== Broadcast ==
The TV show debuted on 2 May 2018 as a Netflix original in episode bundles referred to as "seasons". Each "season" consists of 8 episodes which was released at certain dates and varied in countries and territories worldwide. The series premiered on YTV in Canada on June 22, Pop in the UK and Ireland on October 22, all in 2018, Gulli in France and Super RTL in Germany, the latter two with local-dubbing replacements. The show airs in Pakistan on Pop. The second season of 8 episodes debuted on the streaming service on September 14, 2018, and the third season on February 15, 2019. As Barbie Dreamhouse Adventures: Go Team Roberts!, the fourth season debuted on November 1, 2019 and the fifth and final season debuted on January 19, 2020 and concluded on April 11, 2020.

== Cast ==
- America Young as Barbie Roberts
  - Elli Moore as the singing voice of Barbie
- Kirsten Day as Skipper Roberts, Barbie's oldest sister. She is a smart teenager girl who loves technology and DJing.
- Cassandra Lee Morris as Stacie Roberts, Barbie's second-oldest sister. She is fun-loving, talented, and athletic.
- Cassidy Naber as Chelsea Roberts, Barbie's youngest sister. She is the most imaginative of the Roberts girls.
- Lisa Fuson as Margaret Roberts, Barbie, Skipper, Stacie, and Chelsea's mom, and Poppy Reardon, an antagonistic neighbor.
- Greg Chun as George Roberts, Barbie, Skipper, Stacie, and Chelsea's dad.
- Desirae Whitfield as Nikki Watkins, Barbie's African-American best friend, who is into fashion.
- Cristina Milizia as Teresa Rivera, Barbie's Latina-American best friend, who is an aspiring singer and songwriter. She is also a straight-A student and a gymnast.
- Stephanie Sheh as Renee Chao, Barbie's Chinese-American best friend and a main character in the franchise since Barbie: Spy Squad. Her relatives live in China.
- Emma Galvin as Daisy Kostopoulos, Barbie's best friend, who likes Scratch DJing and has pink hair. Daisy inspired Skipper to be a Scratch DJ.
- Ritesh Rajan as Ken Carson, Barbie's best friend and the Roberts' longtime neighbor. He wants to become a marine biologist.
- Johnny Yong Bosch as Whittaker Reardon, Poppy's husband.
- Eamon Brennan as Trey Reardon, Poppy and Whittaker's only son. He is selfish and calls himself the king of Malibu.

=== Others ===
- Tara Sands as Dreamhouse Door
- Kirsten Day as Ben, Teresa's phone, and Tammy Bounceaway, an Asian-American rival of Barbie.
- Benjamin Diskin as Greg
- Rhomeyn Johnson as Johnny Bee
- Cassidy Naber as Young Barbie and Honey, Chelsea's female puppy
- Megan Jameson as Rookie, Stacie's sporty male puppy
- AJ Hudson as DJ, Skipper's music-influenced puppy
- Kaitlyn McCormick as Taffy, Barbie's youngest puppy
- Charlie Diecker as Jonny
- Cristina Milizia as Baby Bonnie and Mew Mew
- Johnny Yong Bosch as Mr. Guerrero
- Ogie Banks as Ned and Ted Johnson, Trey's twin best friends also known as "The Dudes"
- Ben Pronsky as Henric Henricson, Rufus, and Narrator
- Nakia Burrise as Principal Miller
- Spike Spencer as Jonathan and Harry Havarti

== Episodes ==
Season	Episodes	Originally released	
Season	Episodes	First released	Last released
1	8	May 2, 2018	May 2, 2018
2	9	September 14, 2018	September 14, 2018
3	9	February 15, 2019	February 15, 2019
4	13	November 1, 2019	November 1, 2019
5	13	January 19, 2020	April 11, 2020
Films	4	September 18, 2017	September 1, 2021

=== Season 1 (2018) ===
No. overall	No. in season	Title	Directed by	Written by	Original release date
1	1	"Welcome to the Dreamhouse!"	Conrad Helten	Story by : Nina Bargiel; Teleplay by : Daniel Franklin	May 2, 2018
Barbie's "Best Day Ever" starts out great—until the dreamhouse starts acting up. Could their new home be cursed?
2	2	"Clubhouse (Remix)"	Patrice Bérubé & Saul Blinkoff	Nina Bargiel & Grant Moran	May 2, 2018
Barbie and her friends plan a birthday surprise for Chelsea by giving her a clubhouse makeover. However, their missions take a smelly detour.
3	3	"Nobody's Cupcake"	Patrice Bérubé & Conrad Helten	Grant Moran	May 2, 2018
Barbie puts her skills to the test when she competes on an extreme baking show against a reigning champion who loves to win and hates to lose.
4	4	"The Great Pioneer Adventure"	Conrad Helten	Jayne Hamil	May 2, 2018
The Roberts clan gets back to basics when Dad challenges them to a weekend of pioneer living. And the catch? It is all happening in their own backyard.
5	5	"Baby Sister Babysitter"	Patrice Bérubé	Cynthia True	May 2, 2018
When Skipper lands her first babysitting job, an overprotective Barbie goes overboard trying to ensure everything runs smoothly.
6	6	"Road Trip!"	Conrad Helten	Andrew Nicholls & Darrell Vickers	May 2, 2018
Barbie and her friends take a road trip to hear Daisy drop the beat at a major music festival. However, Daisy seems to keep finding reasons to stall along the way.
7	7	"Picture Perfect Cake"	Conrad Helten	Dana Starfield	May 2, 2018
Skipper steps in to handle her parents' 20th anniversary party when Barbie receives a once-in-a-lifetime invitation to attend Robot Con.
8	8	"The Roof Fairy"	Patrice Bérubé	Dianne Dixon	May 2, 2018
With their parents away for the night, Barbie, Skipper, and Stacie recruit Ken for an elaborate plan to bring Chelsea's imaginary "Roof Fairy" to life.

=== Season 2 (2018) ===
No. overall	No. in season	Title	Directed by	Written by	Original release date
9	1	"Balancing Act"	Conrad Helten	Margaret Dunlap	September 14, 2018
Barbie does not really feel like doing her father-daughter tradition, so she passes it down to Chelsea. But is she really ready to let it go?
10	2	"Life Can Be a Dream"	Patrice Bérubé	Dianne Dixon	September 14, 2018
Thinking about the future prompts Barbie to have a dream where anything is possible—and everything is really, really weird.
11	3	"Trey is for Horses"	Conrad Helten	Robin J. Stein	September 14, 2018
When Barbie discovers that Duchess the horse is going to be sold. She and Stacie hatch a plan to keep her around.
12	4	"A Dreamhouse Puppy Tale"	Patrice Bérubé	Andrew Nicholls	September 14, 2018
Instead of reading a book at bedtime, Chelsea tells her family about their puppies' secret—and surprisingly dangerous—lives.
13	5	"Time Will Tell"	Patrice Bérubé	Story by : Andrew Nicholls; Teleplay by : Katiedid Langrock	September 14, 2018
While trying out a new escape room with their friends, Barbie and Ken get separated from the group and wind up on an adventure of their own.
14	6	"Putts for Pups"	Conrad Helten	Julie Chambers & David Chambers	September 14, 2018
Chelsea's campaign to raise money for puppy literacy continues with a miniature golf tournament that involves the whole neighborhood.
15	7	"Pied Pupper"	Patrice Bérubé	M.J. Offen	September 14, 2018
From dancing to baking, the unstoppable Barbie Roberts can do anything—except ask for help when she needs it most.
16	8	"A Day at the Beach"	Patrice Bérubé	Margaret Dunlap	September 14, 2018
Fate turns the tide on Trey and Barbie when they compete for the best spot on the beach. Back at the Dreamhouse, Stacie tries to set a new world record.
17	9	"A Delicate Situation"	Conrad Helten	Julie Chambers & David Chambers	September 14, 2018
Renee is desperate to impress her relatives in China, but Barbie does not have the heart to tell her "talents" need an awful lot of work.

=== Season 3 (2019) ===
No. overall	No. in season	Title	Directed by	Written by	Original release date
18	1	"Virtually Famous"	Conrad Helten	Katiedid Langrock	February 15, 2019
Barbie and her friends get swept up in the pursuit of Internet popularity after a goofy vlog post unintentionally goes viral, and they find being famous is not as great as it seems.
19	2	"All Dogs Go to the Beach"	Patrice Bérubé	Robin J. Stein	February 15, 2019
When dogs get banned from the beach, Barbie and Nikki decide to complain to City Hall; victory looks certain until Poppy Reardon joins the race and fights, but it's fair.
20	3	"The Ballad of Windy Willows"	Patrice Bérubé	Robin J. Stein	February 15, 2019
Barbie and Daisy take a trip to Barbie's Wisconsin hometown, where it is up to Barbie to save her beloved Aunt Adele's struggling inn.
21	4	"Room Swap"	Patrice Bérubé	M.J. Offen	February 15, 2019
When Stacie and Skipper get into a fight, Barbie offers to switch rooms with them; eventually, all of the Roberts sisters learn no roommate is perfect.
22	5	"Getaway and Got Away"	Conrad Helten & Cassandra Mackay (as Cassi Simonds)	M.J. Offen	February 15, 2019
Instead of enjoying a relaxing spa weekend with their friends, Barbie and Ken end up trying to keep the owner's grandson out of trouble.
23	6	"Totally Spying"	Conrad Helten	Daniel Bryan Franklin	February 15, 2019
Trey hurts himself on the Roberts' property, so the family is extra nice to him. However, Barbie and her sisters fear Trey might be up to something.
24	7	"Barbie Roberts: Undercover Mermaid Part 1"	Michael Dowding	Jayne Hamil	February 15, 2019
Barbie and her friends try to wow Nikki's fashion idol at a mermaid convention, but things take a fishy turn when Barbie's sisters become suspects in a mystery.
25	8	"Barbie Roberts: Undercover Mermaid Part 2"	Michael Dowding	Jayne Hamil	February 15, 2019
With her sisters suspected in a string of thefts due to a misunderstanding, Barbie works to clear their names and find the real thief, as well as help Nikki impress her idol.
26	9	"A Dog's Day in Court"	Patrice Bérubé	Dianne Dixon	February 15, 2019
The Roberts family could be evicted from their Dreamhouse unless Barbie can figure out who is behind Malibu's sudden flea infestation.

=== Season 4 (2019) ===
From this season until its end, the series was renamed Barbie Dreamhouse Adventures: Go Team Roberts on-screen.

No. overall	No. in season	Title	Directed by	Written by	Original release date
27	1	"Magical Mermaid Mystery Part 1"	Patrice Bérubé & Larry Anderson	Arthur Brown & Douglas Sloan	November 1, 2019
George decides to take the family on holiday to Costa Rica where he will be filming a whale documentary, while Barbie and friends land summer jobs at a water park in Malibu. When Barbie learns of the trip, she tries desperately to take a holiday from work to go with her family. Unfortunately, she is not able to pick up the courage in time to ask her super cool boss, Darcy. Meanwhile, Trey decides to throw a party at the Dreamhouse, while Barbie is at work. Everything goes haywire when the Roberts' pets are left alone at home.
28	2	"Magical Mermaid Mystery Part 2"	Patrice Bérubé & Conrad Helten	Arthur Brown & Douglas Sloan	November 1, 2019
After her boss is fired, Barbie is promoted with new responsibilities. Unfortunately, she learns that one of those responsibilities is that she has to fire Ken. Meanwhile, Skipper and Stacie join Chelsea on a quest to find a missing mermaid, but end up getting lost. Trey digs a tunnel to the Dreamhouse and the Roberts' pets, having found a way out of their house, give Trey and his goons a good scare. Barbie, finding them hard to handle without keeping an eye on them, takes the naughty pups with her to work.
29	3	"Magical Mermaid Mystery Part 3"	Patrice Bérubé & Cassandra Mackay (as Cassi Simonds)	Daniel Bryan Franklin	November 1, 2019
Barbie's friends struggle to adjust to her becoming their boss at Oceans Extreme. In Costa Rica, Stacie, Skipper and Chelsea close in on the missing mermaid.
30	4	"Magical Mermaid Mystery Part 4"	Patrice Bérubé	Story by : Eric Shaw; Teleplay by : Ann Austen	November 1, 2019
Barbie and her friends create a plan to stop smugglers and save a baby whale. As a reward, Barbie gets a ticket to Costa Rica, where she joins her family to see the whales arrive.
31	5	"Sister Class Act"	Larry Anderson	Arthur Brown & Douglas Sloan	November 1, 2019
On her first day back to school, Barbie learns that Golden Beach High's newest student is none other than Tammy, her opponent from the baking competition show.
32	6	"Basket Case"	Cassandra Mackay (as Cassi Simonds)	Katiedid Langrock	November 1, 2019
Barbie offers to help Renee build her school basketball team by trying out, but she soon realizes that she is not as great as she thought she would be.
33	7	"Barbie's Dance Dilemma"	Patrice Bérubé	Daniel Bryan Franklin	November 1, 2019
Ken asks Barbie to help him invite Harriet to a school dance. Despite her mixed feelings, Barbie agrees to do it, because what are friends for?
34	8	"Working Mom"	Conrad Helten	Arthur Brown & Douglas Sloan	November 1, 2019
When Margaret hesitates to take a promotion at her job, Barbie and her sisters work together to prove to their mother that they can handle extra responsibilities.
35	9	"Something Borrowed"	Larry Anderson	Daniel Bryan Franklin	November 1, 2019
Skipper borrows Barbie's jacket without permission and ends up misplacing it. The two sisters race around town trying to retrieve the jacket, which has their father's 20th anniversary gift to their mother in its pocket, but are always one step behind.
36	10	"The In Crowd"	Cassandra Mackay (as Cassi Simonds)	Robin J. Stein	November 1, 2019
Barbie tries to help Skipper adjust to high school by inviting her to join her lunch table. When Skipper bonds with her friends, Barbie unexpectedly feels left out.
37	11	"Family of the Year"	Patrice Bérubé	M.J. Offen	November 1, 2019
The Roberts family are driven to enter Malibu's annual Family of the Year contest, competing against the family that has won every year for the past decade: the Reardons.
38	12	"The Sportathon Part 1"	Conrad Helten	Douglas Sloan	November 1, 2019
Barbie and Skipper collaborate on their school community service project at the Water Park, but the two clash when Skipper does not put in an equal amount of effort.
39	13	"The Sportathon Part 2"	Larry Anderson	Douglas Sloan	November 1, 2019
The Roberts host their neighbors at the Dreamhouse when an earthquake causes a power outage. Meanwhile, Barbie and Skipper decide to raise funds for the destroyed library.

=== Season 5 (2020) ===
No. overall	No. in season	Title	Directed by	Written by	Original release date
40	1	"Spirit Week"	Cassandra Mackay (as Cassi Simonds)	Daniel Bryan Franklin	January 19, 2020
Barbie, Tammy and all of Golden Beach High team up to defeat their rivals, Empire Coast High, which tests Tammy's loyalties due to them being her former school.
41	2	"Nothing to Fear"	Patrice Bérubé	Margaret Dunlap	January 26, 2020
On Halloween, after watching a scary vampire film, Chelsea and Stacie come to believe that Barbie and her friends are all vampires, when in fact they are trying to set up the Dreamhouse into a haunted house.
42	3	"Barbie, Brownies and Bears, Oh My!"	Conrad Helten	Arthur Brown	February 1, 2020
When the Roberts go on their annual camping trip, Barbie makes brownies that no one can resist, but forbids anyone from eating them until the second night around the campfire, per family tradition. When someone eats the entire batch the night before, though, the Roberts clan band together to figure out "whodunit".
43	4	"Family Fun and Games"	Larry Anderson	Story by : Jaya Ramdath; Teleplay by : Arthur Brown	February 9, 2020
After the Roberts camper is totaled after rolling down a hill, to raise the money to replace it, Barbie and her sisters sign up to compete in a game show that is infamous for tearing families apart.
44	5	"Three Ring Dreamhouse"	Cassandra Mackay (as Cassi Simonds)	Margaret Dunlap	February 16, 2020
Barbie feels horrible when outside commitments keep her from taking Chelsea to her first circus, so Barbie decides to make up for it by putting on a circus at the Dreamhouse.
45	6	"Dude Fight"	Patrice Bérubé & Larry Anderson	Daniel Bryan Franklin	February 23, 2020
The Dudes and Trey get into a fight that results in the Dudes befriending Barbie instead. Without the Dudes, Trey finds a friend in Ken when they bond over a video game.
46	7	"The Copy Cat"	Conrad Helten	Robin J. Stein	March 2, 2020
To gain more popularity in school, Tammy decides to imitate Barbie. When it goes too far, Barbie begins to feel deprived of her individuality. Meanwhile, Trey struggles to find a birthday gift for his mother, while Stacie and Chelsea agree to babysit a fashionable macaw named Bella, and end up losing her. Their problems intersect when Bella lands up at the Reardons' home, and Trey's mother, mistaking it for Trey's gift, falls in love with her. How will the Roberts sisters retrieve her?
47	8	"Barbie's Day Off"	Larry Anderson	Arthur Brown	March 7, 2020
Just before a group chemistry project presentation, Barbie catches a cold. However, she does not want to take a day off and tries to figure out some way to attend the presentation without letting her project partners down. Meanwhile, Trey fakes an illness to play hooky, but runs into trouble when the principal catches him out of school.
48	9	"The Curse of the Miner's Ghost"	Cassandra Mackay (as Cassi Simonds) & Larry Anderson	Daniel Bryan Franklin	March 14, 2020
Aunt Adele's inn is haunted by a ghost of a miner.
49	10	"Chicken Masked Mystery on Ice"	Patrice Bérubé & Larry Anderson	Julie Chambers and David Chambers	March 22, 2020
With a new ice rink in town, Barbie and her friends put on a show to promote it. However, Nikki gets hurt before the show, and their only choice for a replacement is a mysterious yet skillful chicken-masked ice skater.
50	11	"It Snows in Malibu"	Conrad Helten	Katiedid Langrock	March 28, 2020
Barbie and friends take the camper out to spend some quality time together.
51	12	"Dreamhouse Holidays"	Larry Anderson	Story by : Douglas Sloan; Teleplay by : Daniel Bryan Franklin	April 6, 2020
It is Christmas time at the Roberts House, but not all is holly jolly—Barbie and Ken cannot find the perfect gift for each other for Christmas, Stacie and Skipper take drastic measures to get a good gift for each other, and the whole family has to stop Chelsea from finding and opening the presents before Christmas morning.
52	13	"Close-Knit Friendship"	Cassandra Mackay (as Cassi Simonds) & Larry Anderson	Jaya Ramdath	April 11, 2020
When Barbie, Teresa, and Nikki are asked to write their school song, they learn a lesson in working out creative differences.

== Films ==
Following its wrap-up on 12 April 2020, Mattel Television expanded the television series into television films, which also premiered on Netflix as "television specials" and were then picked up for television broadcast in certain countries. The first film from 2017, Barbie: Dolphin Magic, not only served as the pilot for the series, but returned Barbie to the streaming service since the 2012–15 web series, Barbie: Life in the Dreamhouse. The second film revived the well-known Barbie film franchise which was put on a hiatus after the release of the first film and permanently made the streaming service the destination for upcoming and newer Barbie content in the United States.

Title	Directed by	Written by	Original release date
Barbie: Dolphin Magic	Conrad Helten	Jennifer Skelly	September 17, 2017 (Canada via YTV); September 18, 2017 (U.S. via Netflix)
Barbie and her sisters go to a tropical beach resort to see Ken, who is doing a marine biology internship with the namesake institution's director, Marlo. Unbeknownst to both of them, Marlo has her eyes set on capturing four gemstone dolphins belonging to a mermaid named Isla to make a fortune. With "sister power", Barbie traps her in the act and have them set free.
Barbie: Princess Adventure	Conrad Helten	Ann Austen	September 1, 2020
Barbie plays a blogger who is invited on a 'foreign exchange trip' by Princess Amelia, who realizes they look alike after watching one of Barbie's music videos online, and intends for them to switch places. Trey wants to see how being a king of the Amelia's kingdom would feel like.
Barbie & Chelsea: The Lost Birthday	Cassandra Mackay (credited as Cassi Simonds)	Story by : Charlotte Fullerton; Teleplay by : Ann Austen & Nathaniel "Nate" Federman	April 16, 2021
Chelsea goes on a wild and fantastical adventure to find her lost birthday after a cruise ship she and her family sailed on by one night crossed the International Date Line.
Barbie: Big City, Big Dreams	Scott Pleydell-Pearce	Christopher Keenan & Catherine "Kate" Splaine	September 1, 2021
Barbie swaps the familiar sunny shores of Malibu for the bright lights of Broadway to attend an exclusive summer performing arts program and meets... another Barbie! They become fast friends and discover they share more than just a name as they explore New York City and all its splendour. As they compete for a coveted once-in-a-lifetime Spotlight Solo from Times Square, the friends discover that competition isn't all about winning, it's about striving to be your best, bringing the best out of others, overcoming doubts and sharing the spotlight.

== See also ==
- List of Barbie films
- Barbie Dreamtopia
- Barbie: Dolphin Magic
- Barbie: It Takes Two
- Barbie: Epic Road Trip
