= Ritesh Rajan =

American actor

- Education: New York University Tisch School of the Arts
- Occupation: Actor
- Years active: 2010–present
- Spouse: Saleena Khamamkar (m. 2025)

Ritesh Rajan is an American actor. He portrayed Linus Ahluwalia on the Freeform television series Stitchers (2015–2017) and also appeared as Mowgli's father in the 2016 adventure film The Jungle Book.

== Early life ==
Rajan attended Mahopac High School in Mahopac, New York. Rajan trained at the Stella Adler Studio of Acting while attending New York University's Tisch School of the Arts.

== Filmography ==
=== Film ===
Year	Title	Role	Notes
2010	The Last Airbender	Fire Nation soldier	
2015	Campus Code	Arun	
2016	The Jungle Book	Mowgli's father	
2016	Barbie: Dreamtopia	Ken	Voice role
2020	Definition Please	Sonny	
2020	Barbie: Princess Adventure	Ken	Voice role
2021	Hot Mess Holiday	Rishi	
2021	Barbie: Big City, Big Dreams	Ken	Voice role
2023	Barbie: Skipper and the Big Babysitting Adventure	Ken	Voice role
2025	You, Me & Her	Ash	
2025	C.O.G	KJ	previously titled as CognAItive

=== Television ===
Year	Title	Role	Notes
2010	Law & Order	Mustafa	Episode: "Four Cops Shot"
2011	A Gifted Man	Samir Patel	Episode: "In Case of Separation Anxiety"
2011	All My Children	Guy	Episode #1.10596
2012	Baby Daddy	Softball Player	Episode: "Take Her Out of the Ballgame"
2015–2017	Stitchers	Linus Ahluwalia	Main role; 31 episodes
2017	Star Wars Rebels	Tristan Wren (voice)	4 episodes
2017	Young & Hungry	Vinny	Episode: "Young & Hold"
2018	Star Wars Forces of Destiny	Tristan Wren (voice)	2 episodes
2018–2020	Barbie Dreamhouse Adventures	Ken Carson (voice)	8 episodes
2018	NCIS: Los Angeles	Deputy Crown Prince Kamal	Episode: "The Prince"
2018	Criminal Minds	Dr. Anit Choudhury	Episode: "Innocence"
2019–2022	Russian Doll	Ferran	Recurring role
2019	Dollface	Thomas	Episode: "Mystery Brunette"
2022	Barbie: It Takes Two	Ken Carson	Voice
2022	Station 19		Episode: "The Road You Didn't Take"

=== Video games ===
Year	Title	Voice role
2018	The Walking Dead: The Final Season	Aasim
