= Mattel Films =

Film division of Mattel (2016–2025)

- Formerly: Mattel Playground Productions (2013–2016)
- Type: Division
- Industry: Film production
- Predecessors: Radnitz-Mattel Productions; HIT Movies
- Founded: October 16, 2013; 12 years ago (as Mattel Playground Productions); September 6, 2018; 7 years ago (as Mattel Films)
- Defunct: October 20, 2016; 9 years ago (as Mattel Playground Productions); June 2, 2025; 14 months ago (as Mattel Films)
- Fate: Merged with Mattel Television to form Mattel Studios
- Successor: Mattel Studios (film section)
- Headquarters: El Segundo, California, U.S.
- Area served: Worldwide
- Key people: Robbie Brenner (executive producer); Ivan Sanchez (executive producer, creativity); Kevin McKeon (vice president)
- Parent: Mattel

Mattel Films was the film production division of American toy and entertainment company Mattel that operated from September 6, 2018 to June 2, 2025. It succeeded Mattel Playground Productions, which was formed on October 16, 2013 as part of Mattel Global Brands, a unified media structural and strategy unit, as itself the successor to Mattel Entertainment and Mattel Studios, Mattel's prior entertainment brands/banners.

On March 31, 2016, Mattel placed the division within a newly created division at the time, Mattel Creations, absorbed its operations into it and, seven months later, made it defunct due to poor box office reception of the release of the live action film Max Steel. On September 6, 2018, the division was revived and reformed as Mattel Films.

On June 2, 2025, Mattel announced a merger, combination and consolidation of this division and its television division, Mattel Television, into Mattel Studios, elevating and/or promoting this division's head Robbie Brenner to/as head of Mattel Studios. This is seen as a revival of the brand/banner Mattel used occasionally or sparingly between 2011 and 2013 in place of their main logo in the end credits for media entries of Monster High, Ever After High and Polly Pocket.

== History ==
A joint venture with Mattel and producer Robert B. Radnitz was launched in May 1970, which produced family films including Sounder, Where the Lilies Bloom, and A Hero Ain't Nothin' but a Sandwich.

In March 2009, HIT Entertainment, prior to being acquired by Mattel in 2012, launched its HIT Movies division in Los Angeles with Julia Pistor as division head, to create films based on the company's franchises. The division's first planned film adaptation was a live-action Thomas & Friends film, scheduled for late 2010.

Former logo as Mattel Playground Productions

On October 26, 2013, Mattel launched Playground Productions (shortened as Mattel PGP or just PGP) as its in-house film studio to handle multimedia productions for its brands for global multi-platform distribution. Its first animated project was Team Hot Wheels: The Origin of Awesome!. Mattel had been developing a live-action Hot Wheels film at Legendary Entertainment and Universal Pictures, films featuring the Masters of the Universe and Barbie brands at Columbia Pictures, a Monster High film with Universal and a Max Steel film with Dolphin Entertainment. PGP was planned to set up three-year storytelling plans that incorporate every part of the company's core operations, from toy designers to consumer products and marketing. David Voss, a veteran in the toy and entertainment business, was appointed as the division's head and Senior Vice President.

With WWE on March 17, 2014, Mattel PGP launched an online short form series, WWE Slam City, to go along with its dedicated toy line. The series was picked up by Nicktoons' NickSports programming block from October 22, 2014.

After Voss left the division in January 2016 for subscription service, Loot Crate, Mattel placed PGP within Mattel Creations upon its formation along with its other two content production units: HIT Entertainment and the content creation team of American Girl at Middleton, Wisconsin. After the critical and commercial failure of the live action Max Steel film on October 14, 2016, Mattel Playground Productions was absorbed into Mattel Creations.

=== Reformation as Mattel Films ===
On September 6, 2018, Mattel launched Mattel Films, a dedicated movie division created to adapt its toy brands into feature films. Outside Mattel, the division is widely recognized as the revival and replacement of Mattel PGP. Mattel Films with Academy Award-nominated film producer Robbie Brenner was appointed to head the division as executive producer and will report directly to Mattel's CEO, Ynon Kreiz.

The division's first two projects were the Barbie and Masters of the Universe live-action films. On January 7, 2019, it was announced that Margot Robbie and Ryan Gosling would star in the Barbie film to be co-produced with Warner Bros. Pictures and Robbie's production company, LuckyChap Entertainment. Barbie was released in theaters worldwide by Warner Bros. Pictures on July 21, 2023, and to date has made over $1.4 billion at the global box office and became the #1 highest-grossing film in Warner Bros. Pictures' 100-year history.

With the Hot Wheels film rights option with Legendary Entertainment expired and reverted to Mattel, its film division shopped the property to Warner Bros. for a partnership on a film for the first time on January 29, 2019. The company teamed up with Universal Pictures on July 16, 2020, for a Wishbone film adaptation.

In October 2020, Mattel Films announced that a live-action animated film based on Thomas & Friends was in development, to be directed by Marc Forster and developed by his production company 2Dux^{2}.

On April 19, 2021, Mattel Films teamed up with Universal Pictures and Vin Diesel's One Race Films for a live-action film adaptation of the 1966-launched toy, Rock 'Em Sock 'Em Robots, starring Vin Diesel, a Barney film with Daniel Kaluuya, a Polly Pocket film with Lena Dunham and Lily Collins.

On June 24, 2021, Mattel Films and Metro-Goldwyn-Mayer agreed to work on a live-action film based on Polly Pocket.

On December 16, 2021, Mattel Films announced its first project based on outside intellectual property: Christmas Balloon, which is written by Gabby Revilla. The film is intended to be based on the true story of a young girl who tried to send her Christmas message to Santa via a balloon.

In July 2022, Mattel Films and Skydance announced the development of a live-action film based on the Matchbox die-cast toy vehicles.

On June 2, 2025, Mattel announced a merger, combination and consolidation of this division and its television division into Mattel Studios, elevating and promoting Mattel Films head Robbie Brenner to head of Mattel Studios. This is seen as a revival of the brand/banner Mattel used occasionally or sparingly between 2011 and 2013 in place of their main logo in the end credits for media entries of Monster High, Ever After High and Polly Pocket. Consequently, productions previously announced and in development with these two divisions will now be assumed by/transferred to Mattel Studios.

== See also ==
- Barbenheimer
