= Teresa (Barbie) =

- Barbie character
- First appearance: 1988
- Created by: Ruth Handler (founder of Mattel)
- Voiced by: Katie Crown in Barbie: Life in the Dreamhouse; Cristina Milizia in Barbie Dreamhouse Adventures

In-universe information
- Full name: Teresa Rivera
- Nickname: Sporty
- Gender: Female
- Title: Teresa
- Occupation: Fashion designer
- Relatives: Drew (cousin)
- Nationality: Mexican-American

Teresa is a Mattel fashion doll marketed as one of Barbie's fictional friends. The first Teresa doll introduced as the 'California Dream Teresa' doll in 1988 and, since then, has been a recurring character in the Barbie toy line.

== History ==
Teresa was introduced as part of the California Dream line of dolls in 1988. In 1999, it was established that her last name was Rivera in the chapter book "High Sea Adventure", confirming her identity as the first Latina Barbie doll. On the back of the 1999 Beyond Pink Teresa box, her birthday is listed as October 2.

Teresa has been seen in various Barbie-related media such as books, magazines, video games and films such as Barbie & the Diamond Castle, Barbie and the Three Musketeers, Barbie: A Fashion Fairytale and Barbie: Life in the Dreamhouse. She is one of the main characters in Barbie & Teresa: Recipe for Friendship.

In Barbie's PC games, she is voiced by Grey DeLisle.

In the music video of "Barbie: Dream Besties" ("Level Up"), it is revealed Teresa's family comes from Zacatecas, Mexico

=== 1988 ===
- California Dream Teresa Doll
- Beach Blast Teresa Doll
- Cool Times Teresa Doll #3218
- Island Fun Teresa Doll

== Personality traits ==
According to Barbie, Teresa is a brilliant cook and one of her favorite activities is to bake muffins. According to Teresa's B Friends profile, she has made 3,120 cupcakes to date; she has also rescued 36 stray animals.

Teresa is also said to like spending her free time reading rumored magazines about famous people and shopping at flea markets. Teresa states that her likes are "baking cupcakes, good karma, vintage clothing stores, tall waves at the beach, tall boys at the beach!"

== Film appearances ==
Year	Title	Role	Voice
2003	Barbie of Swan Lake	Fairy Queen	Kathleen Barr
2008	Barbie & the Diamond Castle	Herself/Alexa	Cassidy Ladden
2009	Barbie and the Three Musketeers	Viveca	Kira Tozer
2010	Barbie in a Mermaid Tale	Hadley	Maryke Hendrikse
2010	Barbie: A Fashion Fairytale	Herself	Maryke Hendrikse
2012–15	Barbie: Life in the Dreamhouse	Herself	Katie Crown
2016	Barbie: Spy Squad	Herself	Jenny Pellicer
2016	Barbie: Dreamtopia	Herself	Jenny Pellicer
2017	Barbie: Video Game Hero	Herself	Sienna Bohn
2018–present	Barbie Dreamhouse Adventures	Herself	Cristina Milizia
2023	Barbie	Cameo	Non-speaking

== Residence ==
Teresa lives in Malibu, California, in "Casa de Teresa" in the fictional Barbie World. She is neighbor of both Barbie and Ryan, as "Casa de Teresa" is located at the left side of the Barbie Dreamhouse and the right side of The Ryan Mansion.

== See also ==
- List of Barbie's friends and family
