= Skipper (Barbie) =

Doll manufactured by Mattel

Skipper Roberts
- Barbie character
- A Prototype Skipper doll. Since 2009, Skipper has had a colored streak in her brown hair.
- First appearance: 1964
- Created by: Mattel

In-universe information
- Relatives: See: List of Barbie's friends and family

Skipper Roberts is a doll created by Mattel in 1964 to be Barbie's young sister. Since 2009, she has had a purple streak in her brown hair and is shown to have a tech-savvy and clever personality. Compared to her sisters, Skipper is introverted and quiet, but also very sarcastic. In some of the Barbie films, she likes to work on her photo blog or DJing. Shes's also level headed and responsible. She had a starring role in the 2023 television film, Barbie: Skipper and the Big Babysitting Adventure.

Skipper's appearance has changed significantly since her introduction. The first Skipper doll was eight years old. She was designed as a response to requests for Barbie to have children; Mattel felt that a little sister would be a better choice instead. Skipper was later changed to a teenager, and a controversial "Growing Up Skipper" doll with growable breasts was created to demonstrate the change.

== Fictional biography ==
Skipper's CGI-animated appearance from Barbie Dreamhouse Adventures.

According to the Random House novels of the 1960s, Skipper is the second child of George and Margaret Roberts of Willows, Wisconsin (their first child being Barbie). In these novels, she attended Baker Elementary, while the Marvel Comics of the early 1990s had her at Central Junior High School.

Since Skipper was re-released in 2009, she has had a new personality to match her redesigned appearance. She is described as a technology lover who likes "being a gadget girl and trying out the hottest techie toys." Skipper is shown to be 14 years old in the TV series, Barbie Dreamhouse Adventures.

Skipper current design has also been rendered in computer animation for her appearances in the Barbie film series and the television adaptations of the Barbie media franchise including Dreamhouse Adventures, where she and fellow younger sisters were given "a realistic and modern CGI look" that was different from previous entries in the franchise.

=== Physical appearance ===
Since Skipper was introduced, the dimensions of the doll have changed significantly. She was 9.25 inches (23.5 cm) in height (compared to Barbie's 11.5 inches (29 cm)) when she was introduced, and then as newer versions were released, she gradually became taller with a teenage appearance. Usually, Skipper dolls have blue eyes. Skipper currently most often has pale skin and brunette hair with a purple streak.

== History ==
=== Creation ===
Skipper was created, along with Midge, to counteract criticism that claimed Barbie was a sex symbol. Midge's facial appearance was gentler than Barbie's, whereas Skipper was a response to requests for Barbie to have children; however, instead of having a married, pregnant Barbie, which would make her too domestic, Barbie would babysit Skipper. As Barbie's little sister, Skipper was Barbie's first family member sold. Since their introduction in 1964, Skipper dolls have changed drastically.

=== Modern (1975–present) ===
In 1975, Growing Up Skipper was released. The gimmick of the doll, which led to much controversy in the newspapers, was that if Skipper's arm was rotated, the doll would become an inch taller and small breasts would appear on her rubber torso. This concept was later used for Mattel's My Scene brand in 2007 with the "Growing Up Glam" line, which was also controversial. In 1979, Skipper's entire appearance changed. She was advertised as "Super Teen Skipper". She had a new body mold which included small, permanent breasts, and a different head mold that made her look slightly older. In 1985, Hot Stuff Skipper was released, which had another new head mold that included the addition of dimples and a longer face.

Skipper changed again in 1988 with the release of Teen Fun Skipper. Her new body mold was taller and more graceful. Her waist was more flexible and her breasts were slightly bigger. Her eyes were also enlarged, giving her a cartoon-like look. At this stage she appeared to be somewhere between 13 and 15 years old. Later, Skipper had a new head mold with smaller eyes in a Pizza Party line, but with the same body mold.

Finally, in 1997, Teen Skipper was introduced. She again had a new body mold and was now almost as tall as her sister Barbie. This was mostly because of her legs, which were now long and lanky. Most notable of all, however, was Skipper's new face mold. She no longer looked like a child, but more like a girl on the brink of becoming a woman. Teen Skipper's packaging revealed that she is now "16 years old". Skipper also appeared to have larger breasts which continued the controversy over her sexualization that has dogged Skipper in the past.

=== Reproductions (1994–present) ===
In 1994, the first vintage reproduction Skipper was produced specifically for collectors to celebrate the 30th anniversary of Skipper's introduction. Instead of the usual vinyl, the dolls were made of porcelain. She wore a blue reproduction ensemble from 1965, known then as "Happy Birthday". In 2007, Mattel released its second vintage 1964 reproduction Skipper doll, this time wearing her "School Days" ensemble and sold in a gift set, along with a reproduction of a vintage swirl ponytail Barbie doll wearing the matching "Knitting Pretty" ensemble.

== Friends ==
Skipper's friends at the vintage stage were Skooter (1965), Ricky (1965), Living Fluff (1971), and Pose N' Play Tiff (1972). Skooter and Ricky had their own head molds, and both had freckles. Skooter was available with the same three hair colors as Skipper had, but Ricky was only available with molded red hair, similar to Midge's boyfriend, Allan Sherwood. Fluff and Tiff shared a head mold which many collectors considered adorable, with a contagious smile. Most of Skipper's first friends were never seen after the lines they were produced for, but another Skooter doll, called Fun Time Skooter, was produced for the European market. She had auburn hair, a Twist N' Turn waist, and bendable legs. However, she had the head mold of the oldest version of Skipper, not the older Skooter doll, which many collectors found strange.

Skipper's friend for the controversial Growing Up line was the brunette Ginger, made in 1976. However, after this line, Ginger was never seen again. Skipper's first boyfriend, Scott, was created in 1980, and was introduced the year after Super Teen Skipper came on the market. Scott sported puffy, brown 1980s-style hair. Skipper gained two new friends after Teen Fun Skipper was introduced. They included the reddish-haired friend Courtney, made in 1989, and her second boyfriend Kevin, created in 1990.

After Teen Skipper came on the market, her first African-American friend appeared. Her name was Nikki, and she was made in 1997. Teen Skipper was going to have a third boyfriend, Zach, who would have joined her in the "Totally Yo Yo" line, but for reasons unknown, he was never produced. Parents speculated that Zach would be too much of a sexual influence on Skipper and the children. However, the head mold for the unreleased Zach Doll was later used for Generation Girl Blaine, the token boy in Barbie's "Generation Girl" Doll line.

In the Barbie Dreamhouse Adventures: Go Team Roberts Netflix series (2018), Skipper is joined by her friends Chantal and Navya, who run a babysitting business with her. Both characters are based on dolls from the Skipper's Babysitters Inc. Barbie line. Chantal and Navya share a love of dancing.

In Barbie: Skipper and the Big Babysitting Adventure (2023), Skipper was joined by three new friends: Joy, Cheri, and Anna. Joy is an Asian teenager with dark brunette hair featuring blonde streaks, who loves music and dreams of becoming a singer. Cheri is a Black teenager with dark brunette hair and pink streaks, passionate about dogs and aspiring to work with them. Anna is a Latina teenager with black hair and blue streaks, a creative jewelry designer who hopes to sell her pieces professionally. All three have summer jobs at Ocean's Extreme and are featured as dolls in the movie's accompanying doll line.

Danielle, Skipper's friend, is a variant with dark skin and curly hair in an Afro-puff. She is featured as a Target exclusive in the Skipper First Jobs line, where she works at a Target cash register.
