= Barbie: A Fashion Fairytale =

- DVD cover
- Directed by: William Lau
- Written by: Elise Allen
- Produced by: Shawn McCorkindale & Shelley Dvi-Vardhana
- Starring: Diana Kaarina; Adrian Petriw; Tabitha St. Germain; Patricia Drake; Alexa Devine
- Edited by: Sylvain Blais
- Music by: B.C. Smith
- Production companies: Rainmaker Entertainment; Barbie Entertainment
- Distributed by: Universal Studios Home Entertainment (DVD)
- Release date: September 14, 2010
- Running time: 82 minutes
- Countries: United States; Canada
- Language: English

Barbie: A Fashion Fairytale is a 2010 animated adventure film directed by William Lau and produced by Mattel Entertainment (under the name of Barbie Entertainment) with Rainmaker Entertainment. It was first released to DVD on September 14, 2010, and later made its television premiere on Nickelodeon on November 21, 2010. The eighteenth entry in the Barbie film series, it features the voice of Diana Kaarina as Barbie, replacing Kelly Sheridan for the first time. It revolves around Barbie who travels to Paris and discovers her Aunt Millicent closing her fashion house. But Barbie and her aunt's assistant Alice try to save the business with the help of three magical friends.

== Plot summary ==
While filming an adaptation of The Princess and the Pea, Barbie questions the director's bizarre creative choices which results in her being fired. Immediately afterwards, Barbie is lambasted on social media and receives a phone call from Ken who breaks up with her. Heartbroken and to get away from her troubles, Barbie goes on vacation to Paris to visit her aunt Millicent, an esteemed fashion designer. Meanwhile, Barbie's friends, Teresa and Grace, go to confront Ken where it's revealed that the breakup was really a recording by Barbie's rival Raquelle, which she made while he was reading a script. Ken decides to rush to Paris to amend the situation with Barbie.

In Paris, Barbie learns from rival fashion designer, Jacqueline, that Millicent is going out of business. Barbie meets Millicent and her assistant Alice and is informed that her aunt has lost work due to negative reviews and has since sold the building to a restaurant franchise known as "Hotdogeteria".

Alice takes Barbie to the attic and tells her about the magical creatures who supposedly lived in the fashion house. Placing a dress designed by Alice in a magic wardrobe, Barbie and Alice find and recite the chant to summon the magical creatures, who introduce themselves as the "Flairies", Glimmer, Shimmer, and Shyne. Impressed by Alice's design, the Flairies use their magic to enhance it with sparkles. As the fashion house is the source of the Flairies' power, Barbie and Alice decide to put on a fashion show featuring new designs by Alice to raise money and save the building.

Jacqueline soon finds out about the Flairies and kidnaps them and demands they add sparkle to her own designs. Finding the outfits uninspiring, the Flairies warn Jacqueline that their magic might be unstable. Jacqueline ignores them and plans to put on her own fashion show the same night as Millicent's.

Despite the Flairies' disappearance, Millicent is inspired by Alice's designs and helps work on the line for the fashion show. Later that night, Barbie's poodle, Sequin, and Millicent's dog and cat, Jacques and Jilliana, are alerted to the Flairies' location by a trail of sparkles. The three pets sneak into Jacqueline's and rescue them. The next day, Barbie, Alice, and Millicent awaken to find sparkle added to all their new outfits, and an elaborate setup for the fashion show.

That night, Jacqueline presents her fashion show, however, the Flairies' magic fails and the outfits start to rot on the runway. Repulsed, the audience leaves and flocks to Millicent's across the street. Barbie and the others model the new designs in a spectacular fashion show. In a finale, Glimmer uses her magic to transform Barbie's gown, revealing her own talent as a designer. Soon after, Ken arrives, having faced numerous detours on his journey, and reaffirms his love for Barbie and kisses her, with the Flairies transforming his clothes into a new suit. An audience member places a large order for pieces from the line, and the payment is enough for Millicent to buy back the building from the Hotdogeteria owner.

A remorseful Jacqueline, who watched the fashion show, apologizes for her actions, which Millicent accepts and even agrees to work with her sometime. Liliana Roxelle, Paris's top fashion critic, congratulates them on an impressive show and invites them to a party. As they leave, Barbie is approached by a studio representative who invites her to work on a new film as a director.

== Cast ==
- Diana Kaarina as Barbie, a sixteen-year-old teenager star with fantastic style. Barbie is optimistic, cheerful, friendly and a loyal and good friend. She goes to Paris to visit her favorite aunt after she is fired from the movie industry, and it is there she meets and befriends Marie-Alecia and the flairies.
- Adrian Petriw as Ken, a seventeen-year-old male with an interest in sports and Barbie's boyfriend. Ken goes on a journey to Paris to prove that he loves her after finding out she went there and he had been tricked. In the end, the two became a couple once again like before.
- Tabitha St. Germain as Marie-Alecia "Alice", a shy, aspiring sixteen-year-old fashion designer with some talent. Her dream is to succeed in the world of fashion, but she is too modest and unsure of herself to make any daring moves. But thanks to Barbie, she gains confidence in her abilities and herself.
- Patricia Drake as Millicent, Barbie's maternal aunt. Millicent is the owner of her own fashion house in Paris. She is fun, strong-willed and kind.
- Alexandra Devine as Jacqueline, Millicent's sneaky and competitive rival designer, who doesn't want to be trendy; she wants to start the trends herself and will do anything to get ahead. She is easy to spot with her hip and savvy personality and is on the cutting edge of fashion, but eventually, she is reformed, and apologizes for her behavior.
- Shannon Chan-Kent as Delphine, Jacqueline's sixteen-year-old loyal assistant and number-one fan. She usually goes along with her boss's sly schemes, but deep down she is a good person with a good heart, and would rather play fair. She likes the Flairies and animals, too.
- Maryke Hendrikse as Teresa, Barbie's sixteen-year-old friend with a unique perspective and point of view. She is very playful and even believes in aliens and the Sasquatch.
- Kandyse McClure as Grace, a sixteen-year-old friend of Barbie. She is very practical and mature and likes to give advice.
- Britt Irvin as Raquelle, Barbie's sixteen-year-old rival. She always tries to make Barbie's life miserable, once even ripped her dress a lot. She calls Barbie and plays a recording of Ken's voice to make Barbie think he broke up with her, inspiring her to journey to Paris and meet her aunt out of misery.
- Chiara Zanni as Shyne, the sassy, fearless leader of the Flairies. She adds a beautiful shine effect to fashions. Despite her dainty size, she isn't afraid to stand up for herself. She also makes sure the other Flairies stay in line. She has a great sense of humor that makes her a blast to be with.
- Kelly Metzger as Shimmer, one of the Flairies. She is a light-hearted, happy-go-lucky dreamer who always expects positive things. Her magical flair is adding shimmer to fashions. She is usually found in the background smiling, but she is still a great friend to be around.
- Andrea Libman as Glimmer, one of the Flairies. At first, she had trouble using her sparkle-magic powers, as her magic often popped before it hit the clothing item. However, in the end, her powers turn out to be transforming things, which is the main course of events for the character.
- Brandy Kopp as Sequin, Barbie's French poodle. Just like her owner, Sequin loves to wear anything with bling, despite being fussy. She is also very playful and likes to have fun. When she first arrived in the fashion house, she became Jacques's muse.
- Charles Fathy as Jacques, a suave Jack Russell Terrier with a great talent for design. When he meets Sequin, he falls in love with her.
- Annick Obonsawin as Jilliana, a snooty, pampered cat and Jacques' friend. Though she cannot help rolling her eyes at Jacques' not-so-inconsiderable crush on Sequin, Jilliana is happy that Sequin inspires Jacques to design again after his hiatus.
- Nicole Oliver as Lilliana Roxelle, Paris's top fashion critic.

== Songs ==
- "Life is a Fairytale" – Tiffany Giardina
- "Another Me" – Lindsay Sorenson
- "Get Your Sparkle On" – Rachel Bearer
- "Une Bonne Journee" – Simon Wilcox
- "Rock the Runway" – Bradly Bacon
- "It's a Perfect Day" – Adrian Petriw

== See also ==
- Barbie in the Nutcracker
- Barbie as Rapunzel
- Barbie of Swan Lake
- Barbie as the Princess and the Pauper
- Barbie: Fairytopia
- Barbie and the Magic of Pegasus
- Barbie Fairytopia: Mermaidia
- Barbie in the 12 Dancing Princesses
- Barbie Fairytopia: Magic of the Rainbow
- Barbie as the Island Princess
- Barbie Mariposa
- Barbie & the Diamond Castle
- Barbie in a Christmas Carol
- Barbie: Thumbelina
- Barbie and the Three Musketeers
- Barbie in a Mermaid Tale
