= Barbie Fairytopia: Mermaidia =

2006 Barbie fantasy film

- DVD cover art
- Directed by: Walter P. Martishius; William Lau
- Written by: Elise Allen
- Based on: Fairytopia by Mattel
- Produced by: Luke Carroll
- Starring: Kelly Sheridan; Chiara Zanni; Lee Tockar
- Edited by: Michael Dowding; Cassandra Mackay
- Music by: Eric Colvin
- Production companies: Mainframe Entertainment; Mattel Entertainment
- Distributed by: North America: Lions Gate Home Entertainment; International: Universal Pictures Video; UK and Ireland: Right Entertainment
- Release dates: March 5, 2006 (Nickelodeon); March 14, 2006 (DVD)
- Running time: 75 minutes
- Countries: Canada; United States
- Language: English

Barbie Fairytopia: Mermaidia, or simply Barbie: Mermaidia, is the first sequel to Barbie: Fairytopia and the 7th Barbie film. It premiered on Nickelodeon on March 5, 2006, and was later released to VHS and DVD on March 14, 2006. Walter P. Martishius and William Lau reprised their roles as directors.

The plot involves Elina (Kelly Sheridan) who travels to Mermaidia to save her friend Nalu, the merman prince. Prince Nalu (Alessandro Juliani) has been kidnapped by Laverna's henchmen to learn the whereabouts of a special berry that will make Laverna the most powerful fairy in Fairytopia. Elina must work together with Nori (Chiara Zanni), a headstrong mermaid who does not trust outsiders, to save Nalu.

The film is preceded by Barbie: Fairytopia and is followed by Barbie Fairytopia: Magic of the Rainbow and two spin-offs; Barbie: Mariposa and Barbie: Mariposa & the Fairy Princess.

== Plot ==
Barbie reprises her role as Elina, a flower fairy who has recently gained wings. A young sea-butterfly fairy seeks her out, telling her that Elina’s friend Nalu, the merprince, has requested her help after being kidnapped by Laverna’s Fungi at the Crystal Cove.

Laverna, the antagonist, is currently banished to the Bog of the Hinterlands. She sent the Fungi to kidnap Nalu and show them where the Immunity Berry is. The Immunity Berry will make her immune to all magic past, present, and future – allowing her to break free of her curse. The Fungi, led by Fungus Maximus, coerce Nalu to comply by threatening to pour (into the ocean) a magical poison which would destroy Mermaidia.

Elina and her companion Bibble travel to the Crystal Cove where they find Nalu’s mermaid friend Nori. Nori does not like Elina because she has a crush on Nalu and believes Elina is competition for his love. When Elina tells her about the kidnapping, Nori goes to rescue Nalu alone. Elina and Bibble eat a magical seaweed that allows them to breathe underwater and follow her. Meanwhile, Nalu leads the Fungi to the underwater Carousel of Confusion, delaying them on their quest to find the Immunity Berry.

Elina, Bibble, and Nori learn the location of the oracle Delphine from the playful merfairies. They reach Delphine, who is disguised as the fairy ferry Shellie, and are told they must prove themselves by travelling to the bottom of the Depths of Despair and find the Mirror of the Mist, which will show them Nalu’s location. Delphine tells Elina she must trade her wings for a tail to reach the bottom, Elina refuses as she only recently gained wings. Elina is given a pearl necklace in case she changes her mind. If she uses the magic in the necklace, she will trade her wings for a tail and the pearls will turn a deep blue. If she is not above water once all the pearls turn back to white, she will remain a mermaid forever.

In the Depths of Despair, Elina struggles to swim causing Nori to go ahead, where she is entrapped by hostile sea plants. Elina activates the pearl necklace, trading her wings for a tail, and saves Nori. They find the Mirror of the Mist and see Nalu trapped above ground. A magical bubble appears that will lead them to Nalu. On their way to Nalu, the “Crest of Courage” – a magical tattoo – appears on Elina and Nori’s upper arms, a signifier of their bravery reaching the bottom of Mermaidia.

Elina, Nori, and Bibble make their way through a fiery cave and reach a cave full of magical fruits, including one that reveals the consumer’s true self – the True Self Berry. Bibble tries various fruits, causing him to yodel, sing opera, and speak in a deep voice. Elina suspects that Nori is in love with Nalu, but Nori believes that royals and commoners can’t get married and still thinks Nalu prefers Elina. Once through the cave they find Nalu held above the water and two Fungi henchmen guarding him. Bibble distracts the Fungi by singing the Queen of the Night aria, from Mozart's opera "The Magic Flute", distracting them while Nori and Elina free Nalu.

Nalu, Elina, and Nori swim to the cave where the Immunity Berry grows to stop Maximus Fungi from taking it to Laverna. When Elina has the berry, Fungus Maximus threatens to drop the vial of poison into the water if she doesn’t hand over the berry. She gives him the berry but he drops the vile poison down the waterfall anyway. Elina dives down the waterfall to grab the vial, landing in the water just as the final pearl on her necklace turns white, trapping her forever in mermaid form.

Nori reveals to Nalu that she and Elina swapped the Immunity Berry with the True Self Berry, as they look similar. Elina eats another of True Self Berries and regains her wings, losing her tail. The wings are a different pattern to the ones she had previously, and she has a new dress. Nori reveals her feelings for Nalu after Elina confirms that she and Nalu are just friends.

Laverna, in the Bogs of the Hinterlands, takes a bite of the True Self Berry thinking it is the Immunity Berry. She is then transformed into a toad and vows vengeance on Elina. Elina returns to the Magic Meadow, where Azura congratulates them and they tell Dandelion their story.

== Cast ==
- Kelly Sheridan as Elina (played by Barbie)
- Lee Tockar as Bibble / Fungus 1 & 2
- Christopher Gaze as Fungus Maximus
- Kathleen Barr as Laverna
- Chiara Zanni as Nori
- Andrea Libman as Sea Butterfly
- Brittney Wilson as Yellow Merfairy
- Pam Hyatt as Wise Fish
- Tabitha St. Germain as Dandelion / Teeny Mermaid
- Venus Terzo as Azura / Purple Merfairy
- Blu Mankuma as Deep Bibble
- Alessandro Juliani as Nalu
- Nicole Oliver as Shellie / Delphine
- Teryl Rothery as Pink Merfairy
- Raphael Wagner as Opera Bibble

== Reception ==
Sandie Angulo Chen of Common Sense Media gave the film three stars out of five, stating that the "undersea Barbie adventure will enchant little ones".

The film is well-regarded among Barbie movie fans, with online columns often ranking it relatively high among the catalogue of 44 Barbie animated films.

== See also ==
- List of Barbie films
- Barbie Fairytopia
