= Elise Allen =

American screenwriter

- Born: Philadelphia, Pennsylvania, U.S.
- Occupations: Children's television screen writer author and producer
- Website: www.eliseallen.com

Elise Allen is an American writer, television producer and screenwriter. Allen is a New York Times best-selling author and an Emmy nominated writer, known for developing and showrunning the animated series Princess Power for Netflix, which was produced by Drew Barrymore, and based on the books by Savannah Guthrie and Alli Oppenheim. Allen also co-created the animated series Rainbow Rangers, writing numerous scripts for the Barbie film series, co-writing Elixir with Hilary Duff and co-authoring the Gabby Duran & the Unsittables book series, which was turned into a series on the Disney Channel.

== Filmography ==
=== Television ===
Year	Title	Notes
2026	Pupstruction	Writer (2 episodes)
2025	SuperKitties	Writer (2 episodes)
2023–2024	Princess Power	Developed by, Executive Producer/Showrunner (all episodes)
2021	T.O.T.S.	Writer (1 episode)
2021	Gabby's Dollhouse	Writer (1 episode)
2020	Rainbow High	Developed, Story Editor, Writer (5 episodes)
2019–2021	Gabby Duran and the Unsittables	Based upon the Novel written by (all episodes); Co-executive producer (series finale)
2019	Abby Hatcher	Writer (2 episodes), Story Editor (26 episodes)
2018	Rainbow Rangers	Co-Creator and Story Editor (all episodes)
2018	Polly Pocket	Writer (4 episodes)
2016	The Lion Guard	Writer (18 episodes), Story (2 episodes), Voice actor (1 episode)
2013	LoliRock	Writer (4 episodes)
2013	Julius Jr.	Writer (2 episodes)
2009	Dinosaur Train	Writer (9 episodes)
2009	Sid the Science Kid	Writer (9 episodes)
1997	Cosby	Writer (2 episodes)
1996	Saved by the Bell: The New Class	Writer (1 episode)

=== Film ===
Year	Title	Notes
2013	Barbie: Mariposa and the Fairy Princess	Writer
2012	Barbie in A Mermaid Tale 2	Writer
2011	Barbie: Princess Charm School	Writer
2011	Barbie: A Fairy Secret	Writer
2010	Barbie: A Fashion Fairytale	Writer
2010	Barbie in A Mermaid Tale	Writer
2009	Barbie Presents: Thumbelina	Writer
2008	Barbie in a Christmas Carol	Writer
2008	Barbie: Mariposa and Her Butterfly Fairy Friends	Writer
2007	Barbie Fairytopia: Magic of the Rainbow	Writer
2006	The Barbie Diaries	Writer
2006	Barbie Fairytopia: Mermaidia	Writer
2005	Barbie: Fairytopia	Writer

== Bibliography ==
Title	Year	Notes
5-Minute Princess Power Stories	2023	Abrams
UnTwisted	2020	Twinchantment Book 2, Disney Press
Twinchantment	2019	Twinchantment Book 1, Disney Press
Gabby Duran: Triple Trouble (Book #4)	2019	Co-authored with Daryle Conners, Disney-Hyperion
Gabby Duran: Multiple Mayhem (Book #3)	2017	Co-authored with Daryle Conners, Disney-Hyperion
Gabby Duran: Troll Control (Book #2)	2016	Co-authored with Daryle Conners, Disney-Hyperion
Gabby Duran and the Unsittables (Book #1)	2015	Co-authored with Daryle Conners, Disney-Hyperion
Inside Out: Driven by Emotions	2015	Golden/Disney
Inside Out: Sadly Ever After	2015	Disney
Autumn Falls Trilogy	2014	Co-authored with Bella Thorne, Random House
Jim Henson's Enchanted Sisters	2014	Co-authored with Halle Stanford, 4-book series, Bloomsbury USA
Frozen: Anna's Icy Adventure	2013	Golden/Disney
Populazzi	2011	Harcourt Houghton Mifflin
Elixir	2010	Co-authored with Hilary Duff, Simon & Schuster
The Traveling Marathoner	2006	Fodor's
