= Alessandro Juliani =

Canadian actor (born 1975)

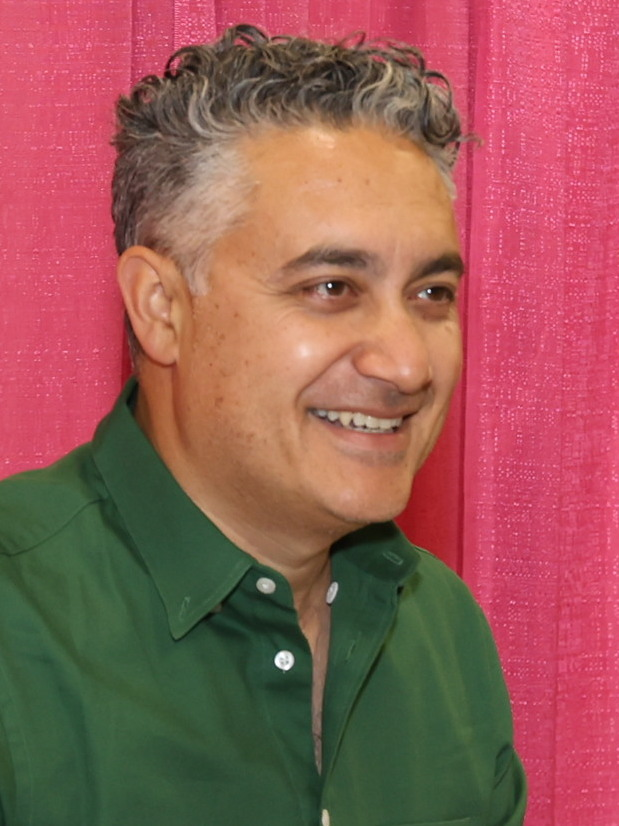
- Juliani at Animate! Columbus in 2023
- Born: 6 July 1975 (age 51); Vancouver, British Columbia, Canada
- Occupation: Actor
- Years active: 1986–present
- Spouse: Meg Roe
- Father: John Juliani

Alessandro Juliani (born 6 July 1975) is a Canadian actor. He is notable for playing the roles of Tactical Officer Lieutenant Felix Gaeta on the Sci-Fi Channel television program Battlestar Galactica, Emil Hamilton in Smallville, Jacapo Sinclair on The CW series The 100, and Dr. Cerberus on the Netflix series Chilling Adventures of Sabrina. He is also known for voicing the character L in the English version of the anime series Death Note and its live action films, as well as several other animation projects. Juliani provided the voice of Toa Vakama of the Bionicle and later of Aaron Fox on Nexo Knights.

== Early life ==
Juliani was born to John Juliani, a producer, actor and writer, and Donna Wong, who co-founded Savage God and Opera Breve in Vancouver. He graduated from McGill University in Montreal, where he earned a Bachelor of Music in Vocal Performance.

== Career ==
He was the voice of Pit/Kid Icarus in the Captain N: The Game Master cartoon series, and offered his voice in many other cartoons and anime including the English version of Death Note's L, Ranma ½ (as Toma), X-Men: Evolution (as Gambit), the three My Scene films (in the role of River) and two of the Bionicle films (as Toa Vakama). He played the voice of Nightscream in Beast Machines, he was also the voice of Julian in Barbie as the Princess and the Pauper, a Barbie movie based on the Mark Twain story The Prince and the Pauper, in which he also performed his own singing; he also voiced the merman prince Nalu in Barbie: Fairytopia and Barbie: Mermaidia, and most recently did both the speaking and singing role of Prince Antonio in Barbie as the Island Princess. He was also in the movie Barbie Mariposa as "Prince Carlos" and My Scene Goes Hollywood: The Movie as River. He also voices the character Koji in the English version of Ōban Star-Racers. Made his TV debut at age 11 in the MacGyver episode "The Madonna. He also played two minor roles in Stargate SG-1 as Eliam in the Season 4 episode Scorched Earth and Katep in Season 8's finale episodes Moebius: Part 1 and 2. He voices the character L in the anime series Death Note and its dubbed live action counterpart. He was also in the two-night Syfy event Alice as the 9 of Clubs. He appeared in the web series Riese as Garin. He played a small role as "Druid" in the TV series Dark Angel.

In addition to his television and film work, Juliani frequently appears on stage, both in Vancouver (where he has earned multiple nominations and wins for Vancouver theatre's Jessie Awards) and elsewhere. In Vancouver, he has been in productions staged by Bard on the Beach, Vancouver Playhouse, and the Vancouver Opera. Further afield, he has appeared in the Aldeburgh Festival in England and the Orlando Shakespeare Festival.

In 2002, he played a grieving Chinese opera performer in Ann Marie Fleming's short film Blue Skies and in 2005 he played Katep in Stargate SG1 Season 8 Episode 20 "Moebius Part 2".

=== Battlestar Galactica ===
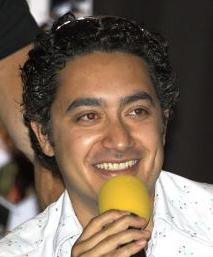
Juliani at the Wolf Galactica Three in London on August 11, 2007

In 2003, the 1978 television series, Battlestar Galactica was brought back to the small screen in what was termed a "reimagined" form, as a three-hour miniseries. The project was written and produced by Ronald D. Moore and directed by Michael Rymer. Alessandro Juliani starred as Felix Gaeta, a lieutenant in the Colonial Fleet. The miniseries effectively served as pilot for a potential TV series which was later commissioned in a collaborative effort between the Sci-Fi Channel and Sky TV (the British broadcaster). Battlestar Galactica (2004–2009) was filmed mostly in Vancouver, British Columbia, Canada.

In the episode "Guess What's Coming to Dinner?", Alessandro's vocal skills were featured prominently. His character's singing is explained as a method of dealing with the pain of a severe physical injury. His voice is heard often when flashing through other scenes and characters.

In March 2009, Juliani won the Streamy Award for Best Male Actor in a Dramatic Web Series for his work in the webisode, Battlestar Galactica: The Face of the Enemy.

Juliani sings in Gaeta's Lament, the first track of the Battlestar Galactica Season 4 soundtrack.

=== Post Battlestar Galactica ===
Juliani had a small part in the 2009 movie Watchmen, as a Rockefeller Military Base Technician. From April 2009 to May 2011, Juliani appeared on Smallville as Dr. Emil Hamilton. The actor will be narrating a twenty-five part serialization of Robert J. Sawyer's Rollback for CBC Radio One. In December 2009, Juliani appeared in the Syfy miniseries Alice, and the web series Riese. In the Battlestar Galactica spinoff Caprica episode "End of Line", Juliani sang in an opera composed for the episode's soundtrack by Bear McCreary. In 2010, Juliani appeared in Riverworld on the SyFy Channel. In the summer of 2010, he played Henry V in Bard on the Beach's productions of Shakespeare's Falstaff and Henry V in Vancouver, British Columbia. Juliani has performed the narration for audio books, including METAtropolis and in 2011 Stanislaw Lem's Solaris: The Definitive Edition. In 2012, he narrated for a new audio book version of Roger Zelazny's Chronicles of Amber. In 2013 Juliani played a minor role in Man of Steel as Officer Sekowsky. From 2014 to 2017, Juliani had a recurring role as Sinclair, a member of the Ark crew on The CW science fiction series The 100. In October 2020, he played Adam in the Supernatural episode "Unity".

== Voice filmography ==
=== Animation ===
- Alien Racers – Undermaster Akhil
- Barbie: Fairytopia – Prince Nalu
- Barbie Mariposa – Prince Carlos
- Barbie: Mermaidia – Nalu
- Barbie as the Island Princess – Prince Antonio
- Barbie as the Princess and the Pauper – Julian
- Barbie in Rock 'n Royals – Clive
- Beast Machines – Nightscream
- Bionicle 2: Legends of Metru Nui – Toa Vakama, Matoran Vakama
- Bionicle 3: Web of Shadows – Toa Vakama
- Captain N: The Game Master – Kid Icarus
- The Condor – Chato
- Dinosaur Train – Martin
- Doggie Daycare – Beau
- G.I. Joe: Spy Troops – Dusty
- Gigantosaurus (TV series) - T-Rex
- Gobots – Buzzer-Bot
- Help! I'm a Fish – Chuck (additional dialogue)
- Hot Wheels Battle Force 5 – Zoom Takazumi
- Littlest Pet Shop: A World of Our Own – Gavin Chamelle, Mayor Perrito, Others
- My Scene: Jammin' in Jamaica – River
- Kong: King of the Apes – Chatter
- Pirate Express – Armando
- LeapFrog Letter Factory Adventures DVD Series – Leap
- Lego Ninjago: Masters of Spinjitzu – Kapau, Okino
- The Little Prince (2010 TV series) – Atsign (The Planet of Carapodes)
- Ratchet & Clank – Solana Trooper
- Super Monsters - Jorge Howler
- Super Dinosaur – Dexter Dynamo
- X-Men: Evolution – Gambit
- Nexo Knights – Aaron Fox
- My Scene: Masquerade Madness – River
- My Scene Goes Hollywood: The Movie – River

=== Live action/English dubbing ===
- Death Note - L
- Death Note 2: The Last Name - L
- L: Change the World - L Lawliet
- Smallville - Emil Hamilton
- Chilling Adventures of Sabrina - Dr. Cerberus
- Big Sky - Doctor (1x07 - I Fall to Pieces)
- The 100 (American TV series) - Sinclair
- Bates Motel - Inteviewer (4x5 - Refraction)
- Supernatural - Adam (15x17 - Unity)

=== Anime ===
- Death Note – L – 2008 Society for the Promotion of Japanese Animation Award, Best Voice Actor (English)
- Oban Star-Racers – Koji
- Ranma ½: Nihao My Concubine – Prince Toma
- Zoids Fuzors – Burton

=== Video games ===
- Hot Wheels Battle Force 5 – Zoom Takazumi
- My Scene Goes Hollywood: The Movie – River
- Dead Rising 2 – Reed Wallbeck
- Devil Kings – Frost (English dub version)
- Kessen – Hidetada Tokugawa/Hideaki Kobayakawa/Hidemoto Mori/Natoaka Yi/Tadatomo Honda (English dub version)
