= Pam Hyatt =

Retired Canadian actress (born 1936)

- Born: Pamela Hyatt; April 9, 1936 (age 90); Garden City, Long Island, New York, United States
- Occupation: Actress
- Years active: 1974–2021
- Spouse(s): John Foster (m. 1957; div. 196?); Todd Allan Ward (m. 19??; died 2023)
- Children: 2, including Zack Ward

Pamela "Pam" Hyatt (born April 9, 1936) is a retired American-born Canadian actress.

== Career ==
Pam is best known for voicing Noble Heart Horse in 1986's The Care Bears Movie II: A New Generation and the voice of Kaede in the English version of Inuyasha. She also guest-starred in USA Network's The Dead Zone and voiced Campe and Atropos in Class of the Titans.

In 2012, Hyatt released her debut album Pamalot! with Peter Hill on piano.

== Personal life ==
Hyatt is the mother of Carson T. Foster and actor Zack Ward.

== Partial filmography ==
=== Film ===
Year	Title	Role	Notes
1974	Only God Knows	Waitress	
1981	Circle of Two	Mrs. Smyth	
1986	Care Bears Movie II: A New Generation	Noble Heart Horse (voice)	
1986	Police Academy 3: Back in Training	Sarah's Mother	
1986	Killer Party	Mrs. Henshaw	
1996	The Legend of Gator Face	Mayor's Wife	
2001	Kill Me Later	Lucy	
2001	Replicant	Mrs. Riley	
2002	The Telescope	Grandmother	Short film
2004	Inuyasha the Movie: Affections Touching Across Time	Kaede (voice)	English version
2004	Barbie as the Princess and the Pauper	Madame Carp (voice)	Direct-to-video
2005	Polly Pocket: 2 Cool at the Pocket Plaza	Miss Throckmorton (voice)	Short film
2006	Scary Movie 4		
2006	Barbie: Mermaidia	Mirror Fish (voice)	
2008	Barbie in a Christmas Carol	Aunt Marie (voice)	Direct-to-video
2012	The Story of Luke	Susan	
2012	Christmas Song	Estelle Barlow	
2016	Mrs. Krantz Bakes Great Cookies	Jane Deville	
2018	Magic Madeleines		

=== Television ===
Year	Title	Role	Notes
1994	And Then There Was One	Roxy's mom	Television film
1994	Ultimate Betrayal	Older Helen Rodgers	Television film
1995	The Neverending Story	Morla (voice)	2 episodes
1995	Ace Ventura, Pet Detective	Atrocia Odora (voice)	Episode: "The Reindeer Hunter"
1996	Holiday Affair	Emily Chambers	Television film
2001	Pecola	(voice)	
2002	Hamtaro	Auntie Viv (voice)	English version
2002–06	Inuyasha	Kaede	English version
2002–03	Yakkity Yak	Granny Yak (voice)	
2003	Infinite Ryvius	Captain of the Dicastia (voice)	English version
2003	Jacob Two-Two	(voice)	
2003	Silverwing	Frieda / Wolf / Flying Squirrel (voices)	
2003	Master Keaton	Mrs. Murata (voice)	English version
2004	Dragon Drive	Ensui (voice)	English version
2007–08	The Future Is Wild	(voice)	
2013	Twelve Trees of Christmas	Mrs. O'Hanlon	
2014–16	Numb Chucks	(voice)	
2016	Restoration	Linda	
2017	The Christmas Cure	Mrs. Willis	
2018	Baroness Von Sketch Show	Widow	
2021	Christmas Movie Magic	Debbie	

=== Video games ===
Year	Title	Role	Notes
2004	Inuyasha: The Secret of the Cursed Mask	Kaede	English version
