= List of Barbie films =

- DVD covers of Barbie films
- Directed by: William Lau (8); Conrad Helten (7); Ezekiel Norton (5); Owen Hurley (4); Greg Richardson (3); Karen J. Lloyd (3); Walter P. Martishius (2); Andrew Tan (2); Various (with 1 credit, 9 total)
- Written by: Elise Allen (16); Elana Lesser & Cliff Ruby (8); Cydne Clark & Steve Granat (4); Ann Austen (4); Marsha Griffin (3); Amy Wolfram (3); Kacey Arnold (3); Diane Duane (2); Margaret Dunlap (2); Various (with 1 credit , 14 total)
- Based on: Barbie by: Ruth Handler; Barbie's friends and family; by Mattel
- Starring: Barbie voiced by; Kelly Sheridan; (2001–2010, 2012–15); Diana Kaarina (2010–11); Erica Lindbeck (2016–17); America Young (2018–present)
- Production companies: Mainframe Studios; (2001–25); as Mainframe Entertainment (2001–07); as Rainmaker Animation (2007); as Rainmaker Entertainment (2008–2017); as Mainframe Studios (2020–25); Mattel Media Division (2001–25); as Mattel Entertainment (2001–2010); as Barbie Entertainment (2010–13); as Mattel Playground Productions (2014–16); as Mattel Creations (2016–17); as Mattel Television (2020–25); Curious Pictures (2006); Technicolor (2011, 2013); Arc Productions (2013, 2016)
- Distributed by: Artisan Home Entertainment (2001–03); Lions Gate Home Entertainment (2004–06); Universal Pictures Home Entertainment (2006–2017); Netflix (2017–present)
- Countries: Canada, United States
- Language: English

Barbie, a fashion doll manufactured by American toy and entertainment company Mattel, has starred or featured in 44 CGI-animated feature films and streaming television films since 2001, which has become a core component of an eponymous media franchise.

In response to a growing rise of digital and interactive media as well as the gradual decline of the sales in Barbie dolls, toys and accessories in the 1980s, Mattel collaborated with animation studios to produce films which were broadcast on Nickelodeon in the United States from 2002 to 2017 and released on home video formats, originally by Artisan Entertainment's home video division and Family Home Entertainment and their successor Lionsgate until 2006 and Universal Pictures Home Entertainment thereafter until 2017. Since 2012, Mattel expanded the franchise beyond just the films to other audiovisual media such as web series, television shows and streaming television content, with the latter following the growing trend of streaming services and online platforms. In 2020, Mattel revamped the films into streaming television films, branding them as animated "specials" and integrating them into the canon of the inaugural television show in the "Barbie" media franchise, Barbie: Dreamhouse Adventures.

A 2023 live-action film featuring the character and toyline was theatrically released by Warner Bros. Pictures and Mattel Films, alongside LuckyChap Entertainment and Heyday Films. It released alongside Oppenheimer from Universal Pictures as one half of a suggested double-feature phenomenon named Barbenheimer and broke numerous box-office records that year with a global gross of $1.44 billion, including the highest-grossing Warner Bros.-released film.

== Adaptations and original plots (2001–2009) ==
Mattel launched its eponymous in-house entertainment division in 2001 and began the Barbie film series by adapting pre-existing stories/tales, with CGI animation provided by Canadian studio Mainframe Entertainment. Elise Allen introduced original storylines to the series through screenwriting the entries of the Barbie: Fairytopia franchise. In between their co-productions, American studio Curious Pictures pitched in by animating The Barbie Diaries (2006).

In 2007, a local post-production company, Rainmaker Animation and Visual Effects, acquired Mainframe, rebranding it as Rainmaker Animation initially and then Rainmaker Entertainment the following year. During this period, the films were originally distributed on VHS and DVD by Artisan Entertainment and Family Home Entertainment from 2001 to 2004, when both were acquired by and folded into Lionsgate. In 2006, Mattel ceased distribution of the films on VHS and focused solely on DVD; at the same time, Universal (which already held their foreign distribution rights) took over the domestic distribution rights, after negotiations with Lionsgate broke down over the low amount offered by Mattel to continue distributing future Barbie films. Lionsgate was permitted to continue distribution of the titles released by them up to The Barbie Diaries for several years after; these rights eventually reverted to Mattel, who then authorized Universal to begin reissuing these titles.

#	Title	Release date	Director	Writer(s)	Distributor	Ref.
1	Barbie in the Nutcracker	October 2, 2001	Owen Hurley	Rob Hudnut, Linda Engelsiepen & Hilary Hinkle	Artisan Home Entertainment	
2	Barbie as Rapunzel	October 1, 2002	Owen Hurley	Elana Lesser & Cliff Ruby	Artisan Home Entertainment	
3	Barbie of Swan Lake	September 30, 2003	Owen Hurley	Elana Lesser & Cliff Ruby	Artisan Home Entertainment	
4	Barbie as the Princess and the Pauper	September 28, 2004	William Lau	Elana Lesser & Cliff Ruby	Lions Gate Home Entertainment	
5	Barbie: Fairytopia	March 8, 2005	Walter P. Martishius	Elise Allen & Diane Duane	Lions Gate Home Entertainment	
6	Barbie and the Magic of Pegasus	September 20, 2005	Greg Richardson	Elana Lesser & Cliff Ruby	Lions Gate Home Entertainment	
7	Barbie Fairytopia: Mermaidia	March 14, 2006	William Lau & Walter P. Martishius	Elise Allen & Diane Duane	Lions Gate Home Entertainment	
8	The Barbie Diaries	May 9, 2006	Eric Fogel	Elise Allen & Laura McCreary	Lions Gate Home Entertainment	
9	Barbie in the 12 Dancing Princesses	September 19, 2006	Greg Richardson	Elana Lesser & Cliff Ruby	Universal Pictures Home Entertainment	
10	Barbie Fairytopia: Magic of the Rainbow	March 13, 2007	William Lau	Elise Allen	Universal Pictures Home Entertainment	
11	Barbie as the Island Princess	September 18, 2007	Greg Richardson	Elana Lesser & Cliff Ruby	Universal Pictures Home Entertainment	
12	Barbie: Mariposa and Her Butterfly Fairy Friends	February 26, 2008	Conrad Helten	Elise Allen	Universal Pictures Home Entertainment	
13	Barbie & the Diamond Castle	September 9, 2008	Gino Nichelle	Elana Lesser & Cliff Ruby	Universal Pictures Home Entertainment	
14	Barbie in a Christmas Carol	November 4, 2008	William Lau	Elise Allen	Universal Pictures Home Entertainment	
15	Barbie Presents: Thumbelina	March 17, 2009	Conrad Helten	Elise Allen	Universal Pictures Home Entertainment	
16	Barbie and the Three Musketeers	September 15, 2009	William Lau	Amy Wolfram	Universal Pictures Home Entertainment	

=== Barbie in the Nutcracker (2001) ===
Based on The Nutcracker and the Mouse King by E. T. A. Hoffmann and The Nutcracker ballet by Pyotr Ilyich Tchaikovsky, this inaugural film in the series stars Barbie narrating to her younger sister, Kelly, a story takes place in the 1890s Germany and is about a young girl named Clara who gets a beautiful wooden nutcracker from her aunt Elizabeth as a Christmas gift. Later that night, the toy comes alive to protect Clara from the evil Mouse King's soldiers. Clara gets shrunk to toy size, and, along with her brave Nutcracker, she searches for a magical Sugarplum Princess to reverse a spell.

=== Barbie as Rapunzel (2002) ===
This 2nd entry, based on the classic tale by the Brothers Grimm, stars Barbie as Princess Rapunzel, who is trapped in a tall tower by an evil witch named Gothel. Hidden from the outside world, Rapunzel spends much of her day painting and dreaming of a happier life. After many years alone, Rapunzel goes on a journey with her friends Penelope and Hobie to look for her happily ever after life with Prince Stefan.

=== Barbie of Swan Lake (2003) ===
Based on the Swan Lake ballet music by Pyotr Illyich Tchaikovsky, this 3rd film revolves around Barbie playing Odette, a young daughter of a baker, who one day follows a unicorn named Lila into an enchanted forest. After being transformed into a swan by a sorcerer named Rothbart, she decides to uncover how to break the spell upon herself and free the forest from Rothbart's evil clutches.

=== Barbie as the Princess and the Pauper (2004) ===
Based on the classic novel by Mark Twain and the first musical film in the series, this 4th film stars Barbie in the dual role of blonde Princess Anneliese and brunette commoner Erika, who go on a trip toward a lifelong friendship. The two soon discover the Queen's advisor, Preminger, has evil plans to take endless power for himself. Only Erika knows how to help Anneliese save the kingdom.

Following the original release of this film, Lionsgate would acquire Artisan Entertainment and Family Home Entertainment and thus in the process take over the original distribution rights of the films.

=== Barbie: Fairytopia (2005) ===
This is the 5th entry and the first-ever original Barbie film, though based on the Fairytopia toy line, starring Barbie as a wingless fairy named Elina who lives in a magical meadow with her puffball best friend, Bibble. Many of Elina's winged friends lose their flying abilities and become weak due to a green-colored potion spread throughout the meadow by firebirds sent by an evil fairy named Laverna. Elina sets off to save her meadow and her friends by tracking down Azura, one of the 7 Guardian Fairies.

This film was released in the spring, breaking the one-film-per-year fall release cycle of the previous films.

=== Barbie and the Magic of Pegasus (2005) ===
This is the 6th film entry, the 2nd original film in the series and the first not based on previous material, starring Barbie as a talented ice skater named Princess Annika. When her family and village are attacked by the evil wizard Wenlock, she embarks on a journey to save them. Accompanied by a hunter named Aidan, her cursed older sister, Brietta, and a polar bear named Shiver, the group uncover family secrets and make a plan to defeat Wenlock to save their people.

=== Barbie: Mermaidia (2006) ===
Also known as Barbie Fairytopia: Mermaidia, this is the 7th entry and the final Barbie film to be originally released on VHS. It is a sequel to Barbie: Fairytopia, as well as the first sequel to a previous story of the Barbie films. This time, the fairy Elina must rescue the mer-prince Nalu from Laverna's fungal minions. Elina and Bibble team up with a mermaid named Nori to locate the prince and save Mermadia.

Following the original release of this film, Mattel ceased future Barbie film releases on VHS, as the format was gradually deprecating in market share and worldwide popularity at the time.

=== The Barbie Diaries (2006) ===
This is the 8th entry and is the first to be originally released solely on DVD, and the only Barbie film produced by Curious Pictures. This film stars Barbie in her inaugural standalone character and her best friends Tia, Courtney, and Kevin as sophomores in high school. The four stick together as they face high school challenges while making music under their band name "Charmz". Barbie strives to land her dream job at the school's TV station but has to battle the school's most popular girl, Raquelle. Barbie must also juggle her boy crush feelings, both with the school's top jock, Todd, and her male best friend, Kevin, with Raquelle advancing on Todd. One day, Barbie opens her locker with her friends by her side and a letter slips to the floor. When she reads it out loud, her friends recognize that Barbie has a secret admirer, but Barbie does not admit it. Barbie begins to lean on a magic diary given to her by a kind and fun-to-be-with salesgirl named Stephanie to help strengthen her confidence and go for her dreams. Barbie would later "rock the house" with Charmz in place of her reporter dream. Kevin would eventually have hold of Raquelle's necklace which she inexplicably let slip from her hands and hand it to Barbie, who was dazzled at its beauty. While he was explaining his "secret admirer" status, Barbie chose to interrupt him in favor of dancing with her.

=== Barbie in the 12 Dancing Princesses (2006) ===
Based on the eponymous tale by the Brothers Grimm, it's the 9th entry and the 3rd ballet film. It tells the story of a widowed King Randolph and his 12 daughters, including the most outgoing of them all, Princess Genevieve, played by Barbie. To ensure his daughters grow up to learn to behave like proper ladies, the King enlists his less fortunate cousin, Duchess Rowena, to teach the girls about royal etiquette. Little does he know that the Duchess wants to end his life and take over the kingdom for herself.

=== Barbie Fairytopia: Magic of the Rainbow (2007) ===
Alternatively named Barbie: Magic of the Rainbow, this is the 10th entry and the final part of the Barbie: Fairytopia trilogy. It follows Elina, who goes to fairy school where she learns magic and dancing. Once again, Laverna comes up with an evil plan to stop the fairies from performing their annual rainbow dance, destroy a tulip called the "first blush of spring," and plunge all of Fairytopia into darkness and winter. Elina and her classmates must learn to set their differences aside and unite to stop Laverna once and for all.

This film is the last to be produced by Mainframe under the Mainframe Entertainment name.

=== Barbie as the Island Princess (2007) ===
This is the 11th film entry, the second musical film in the series, and the only film to be produced by Mainframe Studios under the Rainmaker Animation name following the Rainmaker Income Fund acquisition. It stars Barbie as a shipwrecked young girl named Rosella who lands and grows up on an island along with its inhabitant anthropomorphic animals. One day, a prince named Antonio and his right-hand man, Fraser, arrive on the island and meet Rosella, who was at first known as simply Ro, and her pet friends to explore civilization. Together, they discover a plot to recover Ro's kingdom and do what they can to try and save the day.

=== Barbie: Mariposa (2008) ===
Alternatively titled Barbie as Mariposa and Barbie: Mariposa & her Butterfly Fairy Friends, this 12th film entry in the series is the first of 2 spin-offs of the Barbie: Fairytopia trilogy-turned-franchise and the first to be produced by Mainframe Studios under the Rainmaker Entertainment name.

In this film, Elina narrates a story about a fairy named Mariposa and her friends, Rayna and Rayla, living in a distant kingdom in Fairytopia known as Flutterfield. This kingdom is protected by magical lights put in place by its ruler, Queen Marabella. However, when Queen Marabella falls ill and the lights threaten to dim, Mariposa and her friends must venture into enemy territory to find a cure for their beloved Queen.

=== Barbie & the Diamond Castle (2008) ===
The 13th film entry and the 3rd musical film stars Barbie and her best friend Teresa, who appears as a side character for the first time in a mainstream Barbie production, sharing their love of music. It is the first film to feature Stacie, replacing Kelly, who originally was told stories by Barbie. The two friends star as Liana and Alexa, two girls who live in a cottage with big dreams. After finding a muse named Melody trapped in a mirror, they both embark on a journey to restore a Diamond Castle, before Lydia, a witch who has betrayed the muses, takes the castle for herself.

=== Barbie in A Christmas Carol (2008) ===
Based on the 1843 novella by Charles Dickens, the 14th film entry about the meaning of Christmas and helping those who are less fortunate, stars Barbie and her younger sister, Kelly, who would rather stay at home on Christmas instead of attending the hospital's annual charity ball. Barbie tells her a story of an opera singer and the owner of the Gads Hill Theater in Victorian London named Eden Starling, who hates Christmas. Her best friend, Catherine Beadnell, and close co-workers helping to put up decorations for the Christmas holidays grow more disconsolate about her behavior. They begin to distance themselves from her or even plan with or invite her to any holiday event.

But her behavior and perception about Christmas would all change for the night as she is visited by 3 Christmas spirits; each one coming in one hour after another, showing her Christmas Past, the Christmas Present, and the Christmas Future. Eden only then discovers the true meaning of Christmas.

Nikki appears for the first time in a Barbie film at this entry. This film would feature the last appearance of Barbie's younger sister under the name Kelly as Mattel would change her name to Chelsea in 2011 before Barbie: Life in the Dreamhouse. This would also be the final film scripted by Elana Lesser and Clifford "Cliff" Ruby, who scripted the inaugural film entry with former Mattel executive producer, Rob Hudnut, and were responsible for scripting most of the story adaptations in the films since its 2001 debut.

=== Barbie Presents: Thumbelina (2009) ===
Based on Thumbelina by Hans Christian Andersen and alternatively called Barbie Presents: Thumbelina, the 15th film entry stars Barbie as little Thumbelina working together with her friends to save the environment. A magical group of Twillerbees are one with nature and have amazing abilities to help plants and flowers flourish. However, a young girl named Makena, damages Thumbelina's favorite area of wildflowers for sport. On top of that, a construction company also threatens the Twillerbees' land, and only Thumbelina and her friends dare to try to stop them.

=== Barbie and the Three Musketeers (2009) ===
Based on the 1844 French tale The Three Musketeers by Alexandre Dumas, this is the 16th film entry, the first to depict the original debut Barbie wordmark logo, and the final Barbie film to be distributed by Lionsgate. It stars Barbie as Corinne, a brave girl who longs to become a fighter and protect the French royal family just as her father has. Corinne is disappointed to discover that girls are not allowed to be musketeers. Instead, Corinne and three scullery maids, Viveca, Aramina, and Renée, all share the same desire to fight as musketeers and defend the royal family. All four are trained in secret by a swordmaster and soon put their talent to work to save Prince Louis, who has a hidden affection for Corinne.

== Modern-day plots (2010–2015) ==
From late 2010 to late 2014, Mattel reorganized and swapped the "Mattel Entertainment" banner in favor of "Barbie Entertainment" to reflect a shift in strategy for the Barbie films, which included a switch in focus from princess stories/tales to more settings and plots involving fashion, music, and Barbie's family and friends. The majority of the films below were animated by Mainframe Studios under the Rainmaker Entertainment name. Technicolor partnered with Mattel on 2 of the films, as Arc Productions did, with the latter rewarded by Mattel after the latter was impressed by their animation work on the first non-Barbie-film production; the web series Barbie: Life in the Dreamhouse. Mattel would launch its in-house production division, Mattel Playground Productions on 16 October 2013, absorbing the "Mattel Entertainment", "Mattel Studios" and "Barbie Entertainment" name banners in the process; this name was not used on Barbie films until Barbie and the Secret Door in late 2014.

#	Title	Release date	Director	Writer(s)	Ref.
17	Barbie in a Mermaid Tale	March 2, 2010	Adam L. Wood	Elise Allen	
18	Barbie: A Fashion Fairytale	September 14, 2010	William Lau	Elise Allen	
19	Barbie: A Fairy Secret	March 15, 2011	William Lau	Elise Allen	
20	Barbie: Princess Charm School	September 13, 2011	Ezekiel Norton	Elise Allen	
21	Barbie: A Perfect Christmas	November 8, 2011	Mark Baldo	Elise Allen	
22	Barbie in a Mermaid Tale 2	February 27, 2012	William Lau	Elise Allen	
23	Barbie: The Princess & the Popstar	September 11, 2012	Ezekiel Norton	Steve Granat & Cydne Clark	
24	Barbie in the Pink Shoes	February 26, 2013	Owen Hurley	Alison Taylor	
25	Barbie: Mariposa & the Fairy Princess	August 27, 2013	William Lau	Elise Allen	
26	Barbie & Her Sisters in A Pony Tale	October 22, 2013	Kyran Kelly	Cydne Clark & Steve Granat	
27	Barbie: The Pearl Princess	February 15, 2014	Ezekiel Norton	Cydne Clark & Steve Granat	
28	Barbie and the Secret Door	August 7, 2014	Karen J. Lloyd	Brian Hohlfeld	
29	Barbie in Princess Power	February 26, 2015	Ezekiel Norton	Marsha Griffin	
30	Barbie in Rock 'N Royals	August 13, 2015	Karen J. Lloyd	Marsha Griffin	

=== Barbie in A Mermaid Tale (2010) ===
This is the 17th film entry, the first modern film in the series and the last Barbie film under the "Mattel Entertainment" banner. It stars Barbie as a surfer named Merliah Summers who lives with her grandfather in Malibu, California. Previously believing that she is an ordinary teen, she learns of her true identity during a surfing tournament: she is a mermaid princess of a kingdom called Oceana. With new dolphin and mermaid friends, Merliah tries to save the kingdom and her mother, Calissa. The team of new friends needs to work together to find three magical ocean items to save everyone.

=== Barbie: A Fashion Fairytale (2010) ===
This is the 18th film entry and the first film under the "Barbie Entertainment" banner. It stars Barbie as herself for the second time and first since The Barbie Diaries playing a princess in a film take on "The Princess and the Pea". When Barbie heard pounding noises, she stood up from the fictional bed and screamed, making the director cut the scene. She tried her best to politely question the director's motives of bringing "zombie peas" into the film, which he claims "were trending at the time", but she ended up accidentally getting fired by him. Returning to her styling set, she gets a call from Nikki and opened up her laptop to check out what she just told her: her flops at the film she just got fired from. Her friends console her, and she gets a second phone call, this time from Ken, at the time her boyfriend, who breaks up with her and hangs up. She told her friends who got baffled and tried to call Ken again, but to no avail. One of her friends named Grace snatched Barbie's phone from her and blocked her from every communication tool and suggested she and her friend, Teresa, would get Barbie and her poodle, Sequin, to travel far away to reinvigorate herself. Barbie herself thought of visiting her Aunt Millicent at her fashion designer house in Paris. During Barbie's journey to Paris, her friends went to confront Ken, who was recording lines with Raquel on her phone. Before her friends came, Ken could not call Barbie since yesterday but Raquelle eschewed his thought and made a promise to him not to play it in front of the P.A. systems at school for morning announcements. After Grace saw the determination from Ken to get Barbie back, she suggested going to Paris himself to prove his love for her. But he would face numerous detours before getting there, from sitting next to a little boy in a plane to driving in a peasant farmer's vehicle with his pig at night.

Before arriving at Millicent's, Barbie discovers a rival fashion house belonging to Jacqueline, who claims her fashion house is the "finest" in Paris, and Delphine. She meets her aunt and Marie-Alecia or Alice and learns that the fashion house business was sold to a hot dog salesman and the fashion house will likely shut down if sales do not pick up. With the help of Millicent's assistant, Alice, as well as in-house mythical "flairies", Shimmer, Glimmer and Shyne, they come up with bold creative ideas to save the business. Ken reaffirms his love for Barbie after Millicent's fashion house receives recognition from the fashion world. Acclaimed fashion critic, Liliana Roxelle, arrives and invites them on a limousine ride to a party at her mansion, which was elevated to a horse carriage ride. The assistant to the director at Barbie's film at the beginning of the film sped out to hand her a new role at the studio that fired her and now wants her back. Barbie verbally considered it but only after the party after which she would gaze at Ken's eyes and the film fades off.

This film also features Ken in his Barbie film debut and the return of Raquelle from "The Barbie Diaries" and Teresa from "Barbie & the Diamond Castle".

=== Barbie: A Fairy Secret (2011) ===
The 19th film entry is about fairies dwelling in the human world and the power of friendship sees the return of Barbie, Ken and Raquelle, with the latter gaining more screen time than in the previous films.

The film begins with Barbie getting ready for the red carpet rollout for her last film where fashion stylist friends, Carrie and Taylor appeared ahead of her. Taylor drags Carrie out of a televised interview upon seeing "an old friend" named Crystal, with Raquelle availing herself as a replacement. The limousine carrying Barbie and Ken caught the female reporter, with the name Tracy Clinger, who rushed to interview Barbie much to Raquelle's annoyance and jealousy. That jealousy translated to her intentionally stepping on Barbie's dress so it could rip at her leg areas from her knees to her feet soles. Luckily, Taylor and Carrie spotted it and with fake smiles on camera shoved her off so they could fix it with fairy magic. Crystal returns to show pictures. Fairies abduct Wally and Barbie reveals they are also fairies and they may know where Ken has been taken. Barbie sets out to find Ken with her rival Raquel in a secret fairy world named Gloss Angeles and bring him back. Along the way, they face challenges and discover fairy magic but most of all they find the power of friendship.

=== Barbie: Princess Charm School (2011) ===
In the 20th film entry, Barbie portrays Blair Willows, a kind and generous young waitress living with her adoptive mother, Ms. Willows, and foster sister, Emily, in the humble peasant apartment of Gardania. Blair's life takes a dramatic turn when she wins a lottery spot at the prestigious Princess Charm School, where she can learn the ways of royalty. However, Blair's arrival at the school is met with hostility from Dame Devin, a selfish woman who suspects Blair may be the missing heiress to the throne of Gardania. Despite Dame Devin's multiple attempts to sabotage her, Blair finds support in her friends, Hadley and Isla, who stand by her side. As the day of the coronation approaches, Dame Devin locks Blair, Hadley, and Isla away to ensure her daughter, Delancy, receives the crown. But when they manage to break free and reach the ceremony, Delancy realizes the truth and selflessly places the crown on Blair's head. In a magical moment, Blair transforms into Princess Sophia, the long-lost heir to the kingdom. Dame Devin's plan crumbles before her eyes, and in a fit of rage, she reveals her scheme on live TV, shocking the entire kingdom. The ceremony convener swiftly orders her removal. Princess Sophia, now revealed, delivers a heartfelt speech and chooses Delancy as her Lady Royal assistant, acknowledging her role in the coronation. Despite Delancy's initial disbelief, she accepts the honor, and the ceremony is filled with music and joy. As the celebration continues, Lady Royal Delancy brings Princess Sophia's attention to her adopted family, who still affectionately call her Blair. The night ends with dancing and happiness, as Princess Sophia embraces her newfound role and the love of her family.

=== Barbie: A Perfect Christmas (2011) ===
It's the 21st film entry and the third and final Barbie Christmas film. It stars Barbie and her sisters Skipper, Stacie, and Chelsea together in their feature film debut as they pack up and head to New York City to visit her Aunt Millicent, whom she calls Aunt Mille. Along the journey, unforeseen complications pop up, and the sisters find themselves stuck in Rochester, Minnesota where they come across the festive hotel The Tannenbaum Inn. Their trip takes a musical turn in the picturesque snow-covered mountains.

=== Barbie in A Mermaid Tale 2 (2012) ===
The 22nd film entry and the standalone sequel to Barbie in A Mermaid Tale follows the return of Barbie as surfer-mermaid, Merliah Summers, to Australia to compete in a huge surfing competition. While Merliah is away from Oceana, a mermaid with evil intentions named Eris returns to attempt to take over the throne a second time. Merliah and her friends are pushed to the limit as her love for both worlds is challenged. With Eris defeated, Merliah cheers on a local surfing rival, Kylie Morgan, while she discovers her magic powers as she surfs through the water. After winning, Kylie went down the winner's podium to share the trophy with Merliah.

=== Barbie: The Princess & the Popstar (2012) ===
The 23rd film entry and the first modern Barbie film adaptation of Mark Twain's "The Prince and the Pauper" stars Barbie in the dual role of Princess Victoria, or Princess Tori for short, of the Kingdom of Maribella and a popstar, Keira, the latter performing a concert to commemorate the kingdom's 500th anniversary. As they meet and they discover they have a lot in common, including their beautiful looks. The two decided to swap places to discover whether or not the other's life would be as easy as they thought it would be. They begin to find more value in being the best version of themselves in a race against time to save the kingdom.

This film also stars Barbie's sisters; Stacie as Meredith and Chelsea as Trevi.

=== Barbie in the Pink Shoes (2013) ===
The 24th film entry and the 4th and final dance film in the series stars Barbie as a ballet dancer Kristyn Farraday, who one day gets swept away with her friend, Hayley, to a secret ballet world when she tries on a pair of sparkly pink shoes. In this new fantasy world, Kristyn learns about an evil Snow Queen and that she must defeat by dancing her favorite ballets, which are the famous ballets of Giselle and Swan Lake.

From this film until Barbie: Video Game Hero, every Barbie film would be originally released on DVD, Blu-ray, and Digital copies (renamed as "Digital HD").

=== Barbie: Mariposa & the Fairy Princess (2013) ===
The sequel to Barbie: Mariposa and the second of 3 spin-offs of the Barbie: Fairytopia trilogy which serves as its epilogue, this 25th film entry sees the return of Barbie as the fairy Mariposa being sent by Queen Marabella as the royal ambassador from Flutterfield to the fairy kingdom of Shimmervale to make peace with the inhabitants, Crystal Fairies, and the kingdom's ruler, King Regellius, and his daughter, Princess Catania. During the film, the two uncover an evil plot by Gwyllion and her pet bat, Boris, to destroy Shimmervale by turning the crystals into rocks and must rely on their new friendship to save the kingdom and make peace. Unlike the first film, there are hints and flashes of sparks flying whenever Mariposa and Queen Marabella's son, Prince Carlos, meet, which would be seen in the final scene of the film by her best friend Willa, Princess Catania, and Talayla.

=== Barbie & Her Sisters in A Pony Tale (2013) ===
This is the 26th film entry and stars Barbie and her sisters, Skipper, Stacie, and Chelsea, as they set off to Switzerland for a summer horseback riding road trip. Barbie finds a one-of-a-kind horse that she heard from everyone is just a myth, to bring back home to Malibu. Stacie is out to prove she is an excellent rider, Chelsea wants to ride the big horses, and Skipper isn't so thrilled about being outdoors. Skipper, meets a smart, handsome male horse rider who tries to get under her skin, but she would rather try to coax the soft side of him instead, which he would easily resist.

=== Barbie: The Pearl Princess (2014) ===
In an underwater kingdom far away, King Nereus and Queen Lorelei worry over their long-lost daughter, Princess Lumina, while the king's brother, Caligo, wants to install his son, Fergis, to the throne of Seagundia. One day, an invitation to the coronation party of the heir to the throne lands in Lumina's home, far away from the kingdom.

Lumina and Kuda devise every means to hide themselves from Scylla, even when an octopus by the name of Madame Ruckus drags them upon seeing them into her "Salon La Mer". Madame Ruckus sees Lumina's hidden pearl magic talents and employs her straightaway, introducing her to her employees; Sandrine, a sassy headstrong blue-themed mermaid, and Cora, a shy sweet orange-themed mermaid. A mermaid named Delphin arrives with his dolphin friend, gets confused by his Segundia map, and sees Madame Ruckus struggling with her items. In offering to help her, Madame Ruckus inadvertently sends him to her salon where he would meet Lumina, but his dolphin sends him away before he could go deeper into conversation with her. Cora gets bedazzled at his appearance, leading Sandrine to tease Lumina about him. Caligo comes to the salon to meet who he calls "new stylist" in town and requests the "miracle worker" to remodel his son's hair. Fergis sees and gets curious about a plant next to her, leading him to ask Lumina, who in turn asks Cora, who gets him mesmerized upon showing her face. The mermaid Cora is styling and tells her what he thinks of her, which she buys into, and Lumina introduces him to her right after the facial revamp. That would be one of five scenes in the film where conversations between Fergis and Cora would try to stave off distractions from Caligo and Sandrine. Madame Ruckus comes in seconds later with invitations to the coronation party dubbed the "Royal Ball", and they begin getting themselves ready.

Caligo summons Scylla to poison the king's nectar, but she refuses. However, he has his eel friends capture Lumina once he learns from them she is the lost princess. Lumina gets out just in time to slap out the king's poisoned nectar cup from his hand with her tail fin. Caligo tries to save his reputation by having the guards take Lumina, but rather succeeds in pushing Scylla to the bare stone fish spike not covered by the pearls. Scylla tells Lumina about her past and why she took and raised her far away from the kingdom before she dies. Spike replies with the sulfur lily when asked by Lumina if there is an antidote to his venom, which enlightens Fergis, as it is the same flower he wore, which Caligo loosened from him in anger earlier. Cora asks if he knows the plant, but Caligo momentarily grins doubting him. He, however, stands up to his father at the little smile of encouragement from Cora and gives it to Lumina. Feeling defeated, Caligo takes Scylla away, but Lumina summons all the pearls of the kingdom to first lock the door to stop him from escaping, then separates him from Scylla so Lumina can give her the two-petal antidote from the lily. Scylla regains consciousness and hugs Lumina, returning the pearls to where they came from. Free from the stone fish spike sting, she then concludes exposing Caligo's intentions for her to the kingdom. Caligo expresses disbelief, but Fergis backs her up while stating his botanical passion instead of being king which his father wanted. He transfers the pearl of the sea he is wearing to Lumina, which glows and transforms her outfit into a royal outfit; thus confirming her as the lost princess. Caligo is sent out of the castle by Madame Ruckus and everyone returns to party mood, with a picture of the Segundia royal family and the assistants to finish the film off.

The film is the 27th in the series and the final film under the "Barbie Entertainment" banner, with the future films in the series using the production company name Mattel established the previous year.

=== Barbie and the Secret Door (2014) ===
This is the 28th film entry and the first Barbie film under the "Mattel Playground Productions" moniker. It stars Barbie as Princess Alexa. She finds a secret door after singing in the royal garden. It leads her into a magical new world, which happens to be a kingdom named Zinnia. Alexa encounters a fairy named Nori and a mermaid named Romy. They go to try to save the land from the evil Princess Malucia, who is trying to steal all of the kingdom's magic.

=== Barbie in Princess Power (2015) ===
The 29th film entry stars Barbie as a princess named Kara who wants to help out in the community rather than perform her royal duties, which she says is "more like boring". Her parents believed that her helping out in the community is prone to "danger and trouble", even adding "good advice" from their royal advisor, Baron Von Ravendale, who secretly wants to rule the kingdom of Windimere himself. He stated that his father lost to the current king, Kristoff, in a rock-paper-scissors game. A potion he was making got spilled by his frog friend into his machine which also trickled down to a caterpillar in a sewer drain. The caterpillar moved to a branch of a tree and morphed into a cocoon and transformed a pink butterfly. While Kara was complaining to her sisters, Madison and Makyla, about the overprotective nature of her parents, her cousin, Princess Corinne, was revealing in becoming a princess. The butterfly moved closer to Corrine who was annoyed and wanted to slap it away with a stick-like tool, but Kara stopped her instead, causing her to lose balance and fall. Kara helped her to her feet after which the butterfly kissed Kara for a "thanks", which made her feel weird and funny until she became unconscious and slept. When she woke up, she saw her scared kitten and helps her out. That was how she realized the effect of the butterfly kiss. With the help of her sisters, she evolved with her power to become a superhero and adopt the name Super Sparkle. Kara flies around saving the day, but her cousin is having none of that. She overheard Madison and Makayla about how Kara got her powers and set out to find the butterfly and get her powers adopting the name Dark Sparkle and rival her for the affection of the people of Windimere. After Baron remade his pink potion, he drank it to get powers and seek to expel the family from the Windimere castle even to the extent of waking up a sleeping volcano to descend on it. Kara and Corinne set aside their jealousy and rivalry to fend off Baron and have him locked up in an indestructible tower chamber, thus saving the kingdom.

=== Barbie in Rock 'N Royals (2015) ===
The 30th film entry and the third Barbie film based on Mark Twain's "The Prince and the Pauper", being an upbeat modern musical film starring Barbie in a dual role of Princess Courtney and famous rockstar, Erika Juno. Heartbreaking mix-ups in a roll-call in two opposite camps see the two swap camps, with the princess landing in Camp Pop and the rock star landing in Camp Royalty. While the two camps try to reverse the accident, the two girls make the most of their unique situation and begin new friendships while also discovering a plot to shut down Camp Pop because of a so-called perception about "royals having higher esteem than rock stars and/or pop stars".

This would be the last film entry starring Barbie as another character. Future films in the series would star or feature her as herself.

== Post-Barbie Vlogs (2015–2017) ==
Since 2015, Mattel began starring Barbie as herself and not another character in the films with different careers like treasure hunting, gymnastics, espionage, space exploration, golf cart driving and computer programming as well as taking a deep look into Barbie's fictional life to coincide with the debut of the Barbie Vlogs web series on YouTube.

Mattel would retire the Mattel Playground Productions banner in mid-2016 in favor of their then-new banner Mattel Creations, which was created on 31 March that year. On 25 October 2016, Rainmaker Entertainment acquired and merged with Frederator Studios and Erzin-Hirsh Entertainment into a new holding company known as WOW! Unlimited Media, LLC and rebranded as Rainmaker Studios. Arc Productions animated the other 2 of their 4 contracted films and was poised to add a 4th to their portfolio, but could only do pre-production on that 4th entry due to financial issues they encountered in summer 2016, and then filed for bankruptcy weeks later. The 4th entry, titled Barbie & Her Sisters in A Puppy Chase, would be brought over to Rainmaker Entertainment for completion.

#	Title	Release date	Director	Writer(s)	Ref.
31	Barbie & Her Sisters in The Great Puppy Adventure	October 8, 2015	Andrew Tan	Amy Wolfram	
32	Barbie: Spy Squad	January 15, 2016	Conrad Helten	Marsha Griffin & Kacey Arnold	
33	Barbie: Star Light Adventure	August 29, 2016	Andrew Tan	Kacey Arnold	
34	Barbie & Her Sisters in A Puppy Chase	October 18, 2016	Conrad Helten	Amy Wolfram & Kacey Arnold	
35	Barbie: Video Game Hero	January 31, 2017	Conrad Helten & Ezekiel Norton	Nina Bargiel	

=== Barbie & Her Sisters in The Great Puppy Adventure (2015) ===
The 31st film entry sees the return of Barbie and her sisters, Skipper, Stacie, and Chelsea, as they head back to their hometown of Willows, Wisconsin while driving a camper. It follows Barbie, her sisters, and their Grandma's dog's puppies as they embark on a treasure hunt.

=== Barbie: Spy Squad (2016) ===
The 32nd film entry is about ordinary friends working together to achieve the unexpected, and stars Barbie, Teresa, and a new character, Renée, as talented gymnasts who are recruited as undercover agents with bangless ponytails in streaks. With the girls' special skills and teamwork, they track down a jewel thief who is responsible for a long series of robberies and prove they can be great spies.

This is the last Barbie film produced by "Mattel Playground Productions" before its absorption into "Mattel Creations" on 31 March 2016.

=== Barbie: Star Light Adventure (2016) ===
The 33rd film entry is about a space adventure in a faraway universe and is the 5th Barbie film to be given a limited theatrical release in the United States and the first since Barbie: A Fairy Secret. Barbie flies through space on her hoverboard with her furry assistant, Pupcorn, who would later transform into a space kitten. One day, the bright stars begin to dim and flicker. To save the stars, Barbie flies to a new planet to unite with a team of heroes on a mission to save the twinkling stars. If Barbie listens to her heart and follows her instincts, she just might be the leader the universe needs.

It is the first Barbie film produced by "Mattel Creations" since its launch on 31 March 2016. It would also prove to be the final full-length animation work of Arc Productions as they would confront a payroll glitch on 1 August 2016 and shut down days later. They did, however, manage to do the pre-production work for the next film entry before its shutdown. Later that month, they got acquired by Jam Filled Entertainment and reopened as its Toronto branch, but thus left Rainmaker Entertainment as the sole film animation company again.

=== Barbie & Her Sisters in A Puppy Chase (2016) ===
The 34th entry is about teamwork and stars Barbie and her sisters in their 4th feature film together, this time traveling to a tropical paradise in Hawaii for Chelsea's dance competition. When they explore a nearby Dancing Horse Festival, the puppies get kidnapped and separated from the girls and must rescue them before the big dance.

=== Barbie: Video Game Hero (2017) ===
The 35th entry is the final feature film in the series and the final Barbie film to be originally released on home video formats and broadcast on either Nickelodeon or any other children's television network in the United States. In this film, Barbie gets magically transported into her favorite video game and transforms into a roller-skating character with blonde pigtails. She befriends two characters in the game called Bella, who is a roller-skating princess, and Kris. The two girls work together, playing level after level to defeat an evil purple virus trying to control the entire game.

== Pre- and post-Dreamhouse Adventures (2017–2025) ==
From 2017 onward, Mattel took advantage of the rise of streaming media services to revamp the Barbie feature films into streaming television films and have them predominantly released on Netflix in the United States and globally, although they could be picked up by global television networks for telecast. Rainmaker Studios animated only one film before rebranding to Mainframe Studios. Mattel would extend its partnership with Netflix on 21 October 2022, 4 days before the American debut of the franchise's inaugural interactive special, "Barbie: Epic Road Trip", which would also see the pre-2017 film catalog previously held by Universal made available through the service.

The films below follow the events before and after the television show, Barbie: Dreamhouse Adventures.

#	Title	Release date	Director	Writer(s)	Distributor	Ref.
36	Barbie Dolphin Magic	September 18, 2017	Conrad Helten	Jennifer Skelly	Netflix	
37	Barbie: Princess Adventure	September 1, 2020	Conrad Helten	Ann Austen	Netflix	
38	Barbie & Chelsea: The Lost Birthday	April 16, 2021	Cassandra Mackay (credited as Cassi Simonds)	Ann Austen & Nathaniel "Nate" Federman	Netflix	
39	Barbie: Big City, Big Dreams	September 1, 2021	Scott Pleydell-Pearce	Christopher Keenan & Catherine "Kate" Splaine	Netflix	
40	Barbie: Mermaid Power	September 1, 2022	Emory Ronald "Ron" Myrick	Ann Austen	Netflix	
41	Barbie: Epic Road Trip	October 25, 2022	Conrad Helten	Aury Wallington	Netflix	
42	Barbie: Skipper and the Big Babysitting Adventure	March 16, 2023	Steve Daye	Daniel Bryan Franklin	Netflix	
43	Barbie and Stacie to the Rescue	March 14, 2024	Conrad Helton	Kay Christianson-Donmyer & Margaret Dunlap	Netflix	
44	Barbie & Teresa: Recipe for Friendship	March 6, 2025	Karen J. Loyd	Margaret Dunlap	Netflix	
45	Barbie in the Nutcracker (2026) (remake)	November 1, 2026	Bianca Ansems	Kerri Grant	Netflix	

=== Barbie Dolphin Magic (2017) ===
The 36th entry marked the return of Barbie to Netflix since Barbie: Life in the Dreamhouse and would become the preferred destination for newer Barbie content in the U.S. This entry was originally marketed by Mattel as a special and the pilot to the "Dreamhouse Adventures" TV series. Although the film debuted on Netflix in the U.S., Universal did make it available for sale on DVD and digital copies. It is also the first television film with a reduced 1-hour length in duration, which Mattel would use in future mainstream Barbie film releases in a transition to streaming media.

The film was dedicated to Canadian production editor David Hall; he and his pregnant wife died in a car crash a few months before the release of the film.

=== Barbie: Princess Adventure (2020) ===
The 7th musical film and the first since Barbie in Rock 'N Royals as well as the 37th film entry overall follows on from the conclusion of the "Barbie: Dreamhouse Adventures" TV series. It stars Barbie as a blogger who gets invited along with her friends by Princess Amelia to the kingdom of Floravia for a cultural exchange program. With Amelia nervous about becoming Queen, she and Barbie devise a plan to switch places. A rival prince tries to unravel their secret as Barbie and Amelia try to make the switch back before Amelia's coronation ceremony. During the film, Trey Reardon relishes an opportunity to become the king of the kingdom, even making a song out of it with his sidekicks, "The Dudes".

=== Barbie & Chelsea: The Lost Birthday (2021) ===
The 38th entry stars Barbie's youngest sister, Chelsea, in a starring role for the first time and for the second time since the Barbie: Dreamtopia web-based franchise.

Barbie and her family get aboard a cruise liner to celebrate Chelsea's 7th birthday, which would be the following day. The liner crosses the International Date Line to the west. The bell rings to wake the Roberts sisters up by morning, and Chelsea bounces up and down with joy that her birthday is here, only for Skipper to check her phone and see that it is not her birthday. Both Stacie and Barbie confirmed it via their phones. Thinking that her birthday got skipped, Chelsea begins to distance herself from her sisters and runs off to the ship's tip-end, where a talking parrot swoops in to tell her about a hidden magic gem on a nearby jungle island that could solve her problem. Loving the idea of an adventure, she sets off on a quest to find the gem and get her birthday back. She would, however, need the strength to hold her nerve against the native animals of the jungle – who would see her differently than she thought – and make friends with them along the journey. When Chelsea's sisters learned of the possibility of her entering an island, let alone a jungle, they feared the worst could happen and set off to reunite with her.

=== Barbie: Big City, Big Dreams (2021) ===
The 39th film entry and the 8th musical film in the series stars Barbie, who leaves her home in Malibu, California, and travels to New York City to join an elite performing arts program where she would meet another Barbie, but from Brooklyn. The two become fast friends and enjoy spending their time singing and exploring The Big Apple and all its splendor. The two find themselves in a competition for the top spot to sing a solo in Times Square, thanks to a strict father-manager who do anything for his daughter to get it instead. They will later discover that a friendly competition is more about becoming one's best and sharing the spotlight.

Following this film is the second full-length streaming TV series in the Barbie media franchise, Barbie: It Takes Two, which was released in 2022. It exposes the misadventures of the Barbie-named girls in New York City as they invoke attempt after attempt to sign record deals and get their music out to the world while learning about each other's families, friends and contrasting cultures.

=== Barbie: Mermaid Power (2022) ===
The 40th film entry stars Barbie "Malibu" Roberts, Barbie "Brooklyn" Roberts, Skipper, Stacie, and Chelsea as they transform into mermaids to help Isla (from Dolphin Magic) in the underwater world of Pacifica. The Barbies take part in a competition with 6 other mer-people to be the power keeper, a mermaid who can protect their world with the power of the four elements (Earth, Water, Air, and Fire). Marlo also returns to continue her journey from where it left off in Dolphin Magic to seek proof that "mermaids are real," with the unhelpful help of a male sidekick, Oslo.

=== Barbie: Epic Road Trip (2022) ===
The 41st film entry stars Barbie going on a summer cross-country road trip with friends in this interactive special and makes big decisions about the future.

On October 21, 2022 (only four days before its official release), Mattel extended its collaboration with Netflix and included the pre-2017 film catalogue previously held by Universal on the service.

=== Barbie: Skipper and the Big Babysitting Adventure (2023) ===
The 42nd film entry stars Barbie's younger sister, Skipper, a touted babysitting expert, as she takes a summer job at a water park and tries out different first jobs with some new friends when her babysitting business hits a snag. She uses her babysitting skills to save a nearly collapsed birthday party at the park. The success renews Skipper's confidence in her babysitting business, and she and her new friends start a babysitting squad.

=== Barbie and Stacie to the Rescue (2024) ===
The 43rd film entry stars Stacie as the main protagonist. Barbie and her family come together to break into song as they attend a Hot Air Balloon Festival and make new friends.

=== Barbie & Teresa: Recipe for Friendship (2025) ===
The 44th film entry stars Barbie's best friend, Teresa, as the lead star. The Barbie-named girls from Malibu and Brooklyn and Nikki help Teresa re-create a cherished family tamale recipe for the launch of her cousin's New York City restaurant. At the side events within New York City, "Brooklyn" Barbie helps her best friend Emmie come up with a "hit" theme song for its grand opening song number in Times Square.

=== Barbie in the Nutcracker (2026) ===
The 45th film entry features Barbie "Brooklyn" Roberts as the Sugarplum Princess and Barbie "Malibu" Roberts as Clara. Accompanied by Barbie's younger sister Chelsea, they travel through a dreamlike world to recover a stolen locket and rescue Ken from the Rat King. The film is a remake of the 2001 movie of the same name, produced to mark its 25th anniversary.

== Upcoming animated theatrical feature film ==
A theatrical animated Barbie film is in development, to be produced by Illumination and Universal Pictures, following the box-office success of the 2023 live-action Barbie film. The director and lead star of the film, Greta Gerwig and Margot Robbie, are reported to be not involved in the project.

== See also ==
- Barbie, 2023 live-action film
  - Barbenheimer
- Barbie Dreamtopia
- Barbie (media franchise)
- Barbie Dreamhouse Adventures
- Barbie: Life in the Dreamhouse
- Toy Story (franchise)
