= Lyddie =

1991 children's novel by Katherine Paterson

LYDDIE
- First edition, 1991
- Author: Katherine Paterson
- Language: English
- Genre: historical fiction
- Publisher: Dutton Books
- Publication date: 1991
- Publication place: United States
- Media type: Print (Hardback & Paperback)
- Pages: 182
- ISBN: 0-525-67338-5
- OCLC: 22347235
- LC Class: PZ7.P273 Ly 1991

Lyddie is a 1991 novel written by Katherine Paterson. Set in the 19th century, this is a story of determination and personal growth. When thirteen-year-old Lyddie and her younger brother are hired out as indentured servants to help pay off their family's debts, Lyddie is determined to find a way to reunite her family.

== Plot summary ==
Lyddie, a 13-year-old girl, and her family are in their cabin in 1843 when a bear enters. Lyddie saves the family by staring down the bear long enough for her family to climb up to the loft. The bear leaves with no one harmed, but some of their possessions broken. Throughout the rest of the book, Lyddie's troubles are often represented as "bears". Lyddie must perform her parents' duties, as her father left for the gold rush and her mother is insane. Lyddie's mother sees the bear as the devil and moves in with her sister, Clarissa, and her husband, Judah. She takes Lyddie's younger siblings, Rachel and Agnes, with her; Lyddie and her brother Charlie refuse to leave because they believe their father will return. While at the house, they receive a letter from their mother, who tells them she signed them up for jobs in the village, and they have been hired out as indentured servants. Charlie jokes about her horrible spelling, which becomes an inside joke, "We can stil hop" instead of "We can still hope". She learns how to weave and other similar tasks.

Lyddie is sent to work at Cutler's Tavern as a housemaid, and Charlie is sent to work at the Baker's mill. They are now both indentured servants. They are driven there by the Stevenses, a Quaker family; Luke Stevens is very kind to Lyddie and Charlie. At the tavern, Lyddie is treated almost as a slave. The mistress there is cruel, but the cook, Triphena, is kind to Lyddie, and they become friends. At the inn, she jobs working on looms at mills in Lowell, Massachusetts. But she does not take the job, because her mother signed her up for the tavern job. When the mistress is away on a trip, Lyddie goes home. In her house, she finds a runaway slave named Ezekiel Freeman, an ex-preacher who educated himself by using the Bible. Before she leaves, she lends him the money she and Charlie received for a calf they sold. When she returns to the tavern, she is fired, because she wasn't supposed to leave the Tavern without exact permission from the owner of the place. Triphena gives her five dollars, and Lyddie insists she will pay her back with interest.

Lyddie then works at a textile mill in Lowell, Massachusetts, to pay the debt on her family's farm. She is taken under the wing of Diana, a woman who is involved in the struggle for better conditions. She stays with her roommates at a company boarding house. Amelia Cate, one of her roommates, is like a mother to them. Betsy, another roommate, reads Oliver Twist to Lyddie. Wanting to reread it, Lyddie checks it out of the library but struggles to read it. Gradually, she becomes a better reader and speller. Her mother sends her a letter saying her sister, Agnes, has died. Lyddie is grief-stricken. Lyddie works very hard, and so when the Overseer picks up the pace of the looms, she stays when others are fired or quit. Betsy stays on because she needs money to go to college like her brother. She wants to go to Oberlin College in Ohio, the first in the United States to admit women. But, because of the bad factory conditions, she develops a horrible cough. The doctor has declared her too weak to go see her uncle, so she has to go to the hospital, which uses up most of her money. After that, she leaves.

Luke delivers a letter from Ezekial Freeman that pays off his debt. With all her roommates gone, Lyddie is now alone in her room, but her uncle, Judah, drops off her sister Rachel. Also, he tells Lyddie that her mother is institutionalized and they need to sell the farm to pay for this. Lyddie tries to stop him, but he remains firm. Lyddie convinces the boarding house's mistress to allow Rachel to stay for two weeks. She writes to Charlie and tells him of Rachel and the farm, but is upset when he does not reply. Luke proposes marriage to her, but she is revolted by the letter and nearly rips it up when she stops as she almost tears Charles' name. Rachel takes up a job at the mill as a doffer, but soon gets sick with a cough like Betsy's. Charlie visits Lyddie and offers to take Rachel with him to the Phinney family, who owns the mill where Charlie works and treats him like family. Lyddie reluctantly agrees. Lyddie tries to sign a petition for better working conditions, but is too late as the petition had already been sent in and declined. When she is fired from the company for "moral turpitude" – catching Mr. Marsden trying to assault a young Irish worker – she writes a letter to her supervisor, Mr. Marsden. She returns home briefly, considers marrying Luke Stevens, but chooses instead to attend Oberlin College, known for accepting women, and decides to come back afterwards.

== Adaptation ==
Lyddie was made into a TV movie in 1996, directed by Stefan Scaini. The cast includes Tanya Allen, Danielle Brett, Andrea Libman and Lexie Lore.

== Reception ==
Michele Landsberg of Entertainment Weekly rated it A and wrote of the title character's troubles, "The rewards are all the more cheering for being so hard won."
