= Andrea Libman =

Canadian actress

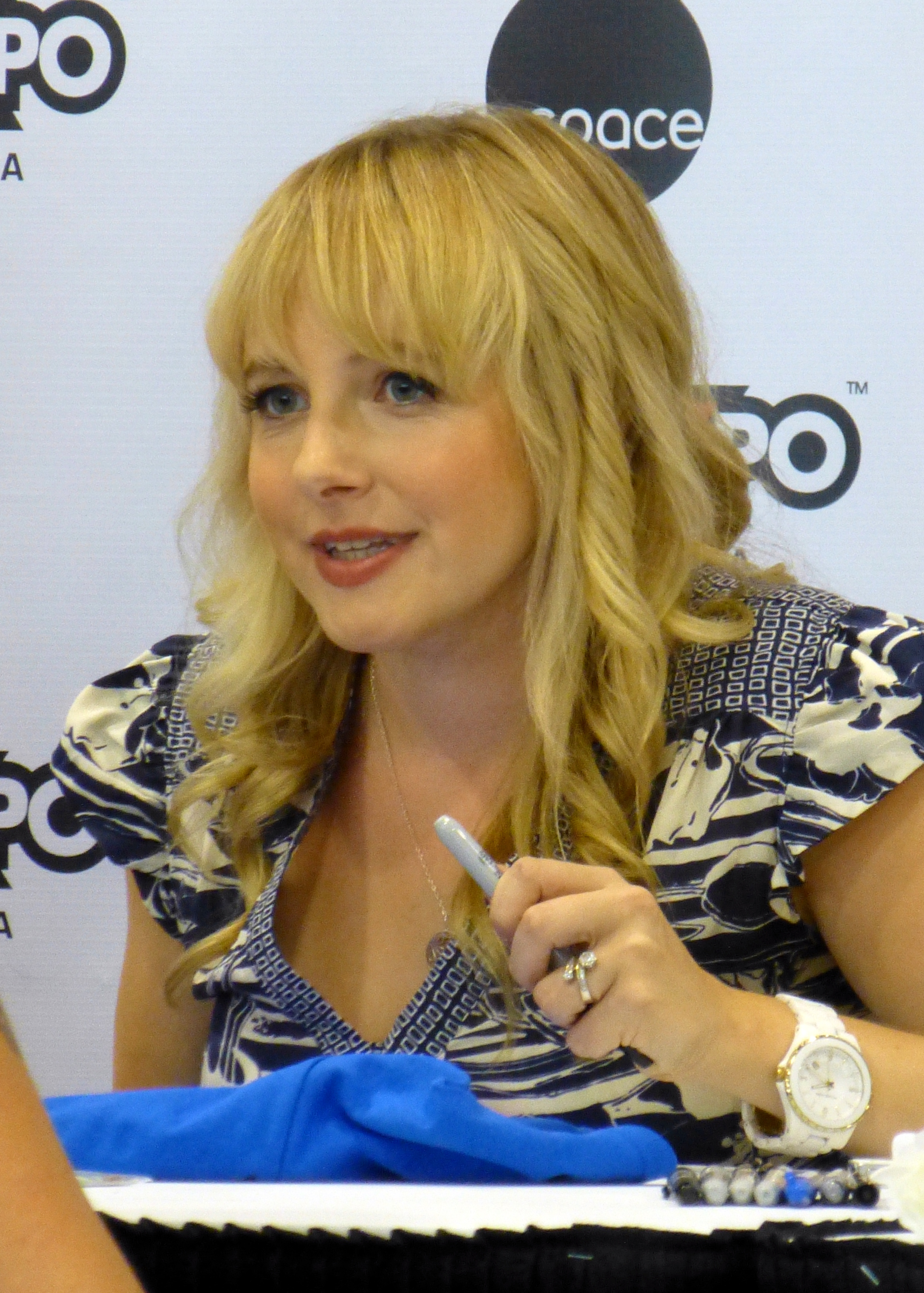
- Libman at the 2014 Fan Expo Canada
- Born: Toronto, Ontario, Canada
- Occupation: Actress
- Years active: 1991–present
- Website: andrealibman.com

Andrea Libman is a Canadian actress. She is known for providing voice acting in various animated shows, such as voicing the characters of Pinkie Pie and Fluttershy in the Discovery Family series My Little Pony: Friendship Is Magic and its spinoffs. She has also appeared in Little Women, Andre, and a guest role on The X-Files.

== Early life and education ==
Libman was born in Toronto to Roselle (née Bourgeois) and Brian Libman. She also has a younger brother.

She graduated from the University of British Columbia with a Bachelor of Applied Science in Civil Engineering.

== Career ==
Her voice roles include Dragon Ball, Dino Babies, Madeline (taking the role of the title character from Tracey Lee Smyth in 1995 and holding on to it until My Fair Madeline in 2002, whereupon the role was passed on to Chantal Strand), the season three version of X-23 in X-Men: Evolution, young AndrAIa in ReBoot, and Isabelle in Finley the Fire Engine. Libman has also voiced Emmy in Dragon Tales, Pinkie Pie and Fluttershy in My Little Pony: Friendship Is Magic, Lemon in Strawberry Shortcake's Berry Bitty Adventures, Cylindria in Pac-Man and the Ghostly Adventures, and Maya in Maya the Bee. She has found a large following of fans in the bronies, the teenage and adult fans of My Little Pony: Friendship Is Magic.

She has appeared on camera in films and television shows including Highlander: The Series, Susie Q, The Lotus Eaters, and Lyddie.

== Filmography ==
=== Live-action ===
- A Brony Tale – Herself (cameo)
- Bronies: The Extremely Unexpected Adult Fans of My Little Pony – Fluttershy (Archive Sound)
- #TweetIt: Featuring My Little Pony Staff and Bronies – Herself/Music Video
- Little Women – Kitty Kirk
- Andre – Mary May
- The X-Files episode "Born Again" – Michelle Bishop
- Highlander: The Series – Belinda
- Susie Q – Teri Sands
- The Lotus Eaters (1993) – Jo Spittle
- The 6th Day (2000) – Voice of SimPal Cindy
- Lyddie – Rachel Worthen

=== Animation ===
- 16 Hudson – Lili
- The Adventures of Corduroy – Lisa
- Animated Classic Showcase – Various characters
- Animal Behaviour – Cheryl
- Barbie: A Fashion Fairytale – Glimmer
- Barbie Fairytopia: Mermaidia – Sea Butterfly
- Barbie and the Magic of Pegasus – Lilac
- Barbie Fairytopia: Magic of the Rainbow – Shimmer, Pixie 2
- Barbie in A Mermaid Tale – Dee
- Barbie and the Secret Door – Nola
- The Barefoot Bandits – Riley (Canadian dub, speaking season 1-3, mostly singing (season 1)
- Being Ian – Additional voices
- Billy the Cat – Additional Voices
- Care Bears: Adventures in Care-a-Lot – Harmony Bear
- Chip and Potato – Potato
- A Christmas Adventure ...From a Book Called Wisely's Tales – Natalie
- Dino Babies – LaBrea
- Dinosaur Train – Pamela Pachycephalosaurus
- Dragon Tales – Emmy, Forest Bird (Ep. "The Forest of Darkness")
- DuckTales – Bramble
- Extreme Dinosaurs – Additional Voices
- Fat Dog Mendoza – Mavis Rambunctious
- George of the Jungle
- G.I. Joe Extreme – Additional Voices
- Heidi – Aunt Dete
- Hurricanes – Additional Voices
- Johnny Test – Additional Voices
- Kelly Dream Club – Ruby
- Kate & Mim-Mim – Narrator
- Krypto the Superdog
- Lapitch the Little Shoemaker – Lisa
- Leo the Lion: King of the Jungle (direct-to-video) – Tooey the lion cub
- Little Red Riding Hood – Little Red Riding Hood
- Little Witch – Little Witch
- Littlest Pet Shop – Additional Voices
- Madeline – Madeline
- Madeline: Lost in Paris – Madeline
- Mary-Kate and Ashley in Action!
- Maya the Bee – Maya
- Monster Buster Club – Cathy
- My Little Pony (direct-to-video animated specials) – Sweetie Belle, Zipzee
- My Little Pony: Friendship Is Magic – Pinkie Pie, Fluttershy, Additional Voices
- My Little Pony: Equestria Girls – Pinkie Pie, Fluttershy
- Equestria Girls: Rainbow Rocks – Pinkie Pie, Fluttershy
- Equestria Girls: Friendship Games – Pinkie Pie, Fluttershy, Sweetie Drops
- Equestria Girls: Legend of Everfree – Pinkie Pie, Fluttershy, Sweetie Drops
- My Little Pony: The Movie – Pinkie Pie, Fluttershy
- My Little Pony: A New Generation – Pinkie Pie, Fluttershy
- My Little Pony: Best Gift Ever – Pinkie Pie, Fluttershy, Minty Bubblegum
- My Little Pony: Rainbow Roadtrip – Pinkie Pie, Fluttershy
- My Little Pony: Pony Life – Pinkie Pie, Fluttershy, Buttershy, Alt-Pony 3
- Super Monsters – Katya, Little Witch Girl's Mom
- The Little Prince – Myriad (The Planet of Libris)
- Pac-Man and the Ghostly Adventures – Cylindria
- Pocket Dragon Adventures – Additional Voices
- Polly Pocket – Dustiny, Dust Bunny Decorator
- Rainbow Fish – Penny Pickerel (Eps. "Rainbow's Pen Pal", and "Rainbow Fish and the In Crowd"), additional voices
- ReBoot – Young Andraia
- Rev & Roll – Avery, Jen
- Sabrina: The Animated Series – Norma
- Santa's Christmas Crash – Julie
- Salty's Lighthouse – Claude
- Sleeping Beauty – Misc
- Snow White – Apple Vendor
- Sonic Underground
- Strawberry Shortcake's Berry Bitty Adventures – Lemon Meringue, Princess Berrykin, Sweet Grapes
- Strawberry Shortcake: Berry in the Big City – Lemon Meringue, Lemon Drop, Lemon Tort, Berry Mary, Salesberry, Sherry Bobbleberry
- Superbook – Barbara, Cell Phone Voice
- The Nutcracker – Marie
- Ultimate Book of Spells
- Vor-Tech: Undercover Conversion Squad – M.J. Sloan
- What About Mimi? – Additional Voices
- X-Men: Evolution – X-23 (Ep. "X-23")
- Yakkity Yak – Lemony
- 3-2-1 Penguins! – Fuzzy (Ep. "Promises, Promises")
- Ninjago - Nyad

=== Anime roles ===
- Dragon Ball (BLT Productions English dub) – Chi-Chi, Penny (first movie)
- Elemental Gelade – Orega
- Gundam 00 – Mileina Vashti
- Kishin Corps: Alien Defender Geo-Armor – Cookie
- Maison Ikkoku – Ikuko Otonashi (Eps. 1–36)
- Mega Man: Upon a Star – Roll
- Mobile Suit Gundam 00 the Movie: A Wakening of the Trailblazer – Mileina Vashti
- Night Warriors: Darkstalkers' Revenge – Anita
- Powerpuff Girls Z – Penna/Pencil Head

=== Other ===
- X-Play – Kanaren King

=== Video games ===
- Dragalia Lost – Serena
- Dragon Tales: Dragon Frog Jamboree – Emmy
- Dragon Tales: Dragon Seek – Emmy
- My Little Pony: Friendship Is Magic – Fluttershy, Pinkie Pie
