= Chiara Zanni =

Canadian actress

- Born: Vancouver, British Columbia, Canada
- Occupation: Actress
- Years active: 1986–present
- Agent(s): Lauren Levitt and Associates
- Website: http://chiarazanni.com/

Chiara Zanni (/ˈkɪɑːrə ˈzæni/) is a Canadian actress. She is known for her roles as Amy Ryan on The N series About a Girl and Maggie Buckman on the CBC series Edgemont.

She is also known for her voice work as Alex in Camp Candy, Bon Bon in My Little Pony Tales, Navah in Conan and the Young Warriors, Amanda Carey in Hurricanes, Mimi Morton in What About Mimi?, Hahli in Bionicle: Mask of Light, the titular character in Hamtaro, Jubilee in X-Men: Evolution, Eva "Molly" Wei in Ōban Star-Racers, Piper in Storm Hawks, Rachel Palmer in Zeke's Pad, Fiona Munson in Kid vs. Kat, Stellaluna in the film adaptation of Stellaluna, Sips in Super Wish and Kani Maki in Sushi Pack.

== Life and career ==
Zanni was born in Vancouver, British Columbia, to an Italian father and an English mother. She started her career at the age of 9, later 10 when she was cast as the "Pokey Little Puppy" in the animated television film Little Golden Book Land. She has appeared in the feature films X-Men, 40 Days and 40 Nights, Come l'America, and Good Luck Chuck.

Her television credits include Supernatural, Stargate Atlantis, Edgemont, Trophy Wife, Bye Bye Birdie, 1st to Die and Post Mortem. She has also provided voice-work to projects such as Zeke's Pad, Hamtaro, Trollz, My Little Pony, Polly Pockets, Barbie: Fairytopia, X-Men: Evolution, Sabrina: The Animated Series, Bionicle: Mask of Light, Inuyasha, Storm Hawks, Kid vs. Kat, and Ōban Star-Racers.

In 2013, she made her Los Angeles voice acting debut with Henry Hugglemonster.

She voiced Daring Do in My Little Pony: Friendship Is Magic, and she has appeared in MLP conventions in Vancouver and Richmond.

== Personal life ==
Zanni is married and is a Christian.

== Filmography ==
=== Live-action ===
==== Film ====
Year	Title	Role	Notes
2001	Prozac Nation	Ruby's Roommate	
2002	40 Days and 40 Nights	Nun	
2003	X2	White House Tour Guide	
2004	Have You Heard? Secret Central	Natasha	Direct-to-video
2006	Love and Other Dilemmas	Goldy Shapiro	
2007	Good Luck Chuck	Bride	
2010	Messages Deleted	Claire	
2013	That Burning Feeling	Sally Sugarman	
2019	A Christmas Duet	Susie	

==== Television ====
Year	Title	Role	Notes
1995	Bye Bye Birdie	Helen	Television film
1997	Breaker High	Ellen	Episode: "Swiss You Were Here"
1998	Every Mother's Worst Fear	Sherry	Television film
1998	Night Man	Rebecca	Episode: "Fear City"
1998	Perfect Little Angels	Kelly	Television film
2001	The Immortal	Ashara	Episode: "Forest for the Trees"
2001	Come l'America	Alida Zecchi	Television film
2001–05	Edgemont	Maggie Buckman	Recurring (seasons 1–4); Regular (season 5)
2002	Night Visions	Gail	Episode: "The Maze"
2002	Critical Assembly	India	Television film
2003	First to Die	Heather Tibbs	Television film
2003	The Stranger Beside Me	Olivia	Television film
2006	Godiva's	Claire	Episode: "Inked"
2006	Stargate Atlantis	Melena	Episode: "Sateda"
2006	Trophy Wife	Chelsea Fordham	Television film
2006	Supernatural	Tracy	Episode: "Simon Said"
2007	Post Mortem	Heather	Television film
2007–08	About a Girl	Amy Ryan	Main role
2010	Riverworld	Deborah Glass	Miniseries
2014	In My Dreams	Lori Beth Wacker	Television film
2015	Motive	Diane Miller	Episode: "Frampton Comes Alive"
2016	Ms. Matched	Samantha	Television film
2017	Home for Christmas Day	Meg	Television film
2017	Garage Sale Mystery: The Beach Murder	Anne Winters	Television film
2017	Harvest Love	Nicole Reed	Television film
2019	Valley of the Boom	Sheila	4 episodes

=== Voice acting ===
==== Anime ====
Year	Title	Role	Notes
1996	Boys Over Flowers	Yuriko Asai	
1999–2000	Infinite Ryvius	Faina S. Shinozaki	
2000	Hamtaro	Hamtaro	
2000; 2005–06	Inuyasha	Yura of the Hair, Infant, Hakudōshi	
2003–04	Zoids: Fuzors	Amy, Chiara	
2006	Ōban Star-Racers	Eva "Molly" Wei	
2012	Inuyasha: The Final Act	Infant, Hakudōshi	
2017	World Trigger	Kirie Konami	Ep. "Tamakoma's A-Class Members"

==== Animation ====
Year	Title	Role	Notes
1989	Little Golden Book Land	Poky Little Puppy	Television film
1989–90	Camp Candy	Alex	
1992	My Little Pony Tales	Bon Bon, Various	
1994	Conan and the Young Warriors	Navah	
1994–96	Hurricanes	Amanda Carey	
1997	The Adventures of Snowden the Snowman	La Rue	Television film
2000	Rainbow Fish	Ruby	
2000–02	What About Mimi?	Mimi Morton	
2001–02	X-Men: Evolution	Jubilee	
2002–05	Baby Looney Tunes	Petunia Pig	
2004	The Cramp Twins	Girl One, Till Girl	Ep. "Room Rage/Dirty Monkey"
2004	Dragons: Fire and Ice	Princess Kyra	Television film
2005	Elemental Gelade	Viro	
2005	Dragons II: The Metal Ages	Kyra	Television film
2005	Trollz	Ruby Trollman	
2005	A Fairy Tale Christmas	Dart	Television film
2007	Sushi Pack	Kani Maki	
2007–08	Care Bears: Adventures in Care-a-Lot	Wish Bear	
2007–09	Storm Hawks	Piper, various	
2008	Holly and Hal Moose: Our Uplifting Christmas Adventure	Holly Moose	Television film
2008–09	Zeke's Pad	Rachel Palmer, Generic Girl, Raphael	
2009	Dinosaur Train	Shoshana Shonisaurus	Ep. "Dinosaur Train Submarine Part 2"
2009	Cosmic Quantum Ray	Atee, Geecey	
2010	Maryoku Yummy	Hadagi	
2010–11	Kid vs. Kat	Fiona Munson	
2011	Rated A for Awesome	Thera, Various	
2012	Care Bears: Welcome to Care-a-Lot	Madison	Ep. "Bully Exposed"
2012–19	My Little Pony: Friendship Is Magic	Daring Do, A.K. Yearling, Random Villager	
2013–15	Henry Hugglemonster	Cobby	
2014–17	LoliRock	Izira	
2016	The Deep	A.R.I.A.	
2018	Polly Pocket	Blair Delaware	Ep. "Socially Awkward"
2022	Super Wish	Sips	Ep. "Wishwharf / The Amazing Maze"

==== Film ====
Year	Title	Role	Notes
2003	Bionicle: Mask of Light	Hahli	Direct-to-video
2003	Polly Pocket: Lunar Eclipse	Shani	Direct-to-video
2004	Stellaluna	Stellaluna, Flitter	
2004	My Little Pony: Dancing in the Clouds	Twinkle Twirl	
2005	Barbie: Fairytopia	Dahlia, Pixie #3	
2005	Ark	Amarinth	
2005	My Little Pony: Friends are Never Far Away	Twinkle Twirl, Triple Treat	Direct-to-video
2005	The Walker Explosions	Ji Aum (speaking voice)	Direct-to-video
2005	Polly Pocket: 2 Cool At the Pocket Plaza	Shani	Direct-to-video
2006	Barbie Fairytopia: Mermaidia	Nori	Direct-to-video
2006	The Barbie Diaries	Raquelle	Direct-to-video
2006	Boom Boom Sabotage	Kit	Direct-to-video
2006	Barbie in the 12 Dancing Princesses	Edeline	Direct-to-video
2006	PollyWorld	Shani	Direct-to-video
2007	Care Bears: Oopsy Does It!	Wish Bear	Direct-to-video
2008	Barbie: Mariposa and Her Butterfly Fairy Friends	Mariposa	Direct-to-video
2009	Sing Along with Barbie	Additional voices	Direct-to-video
2010	Barbie: A Fashion Fairytale	Shyne	Direct-to-video
2011	Barbie: A Perfect Christmas	Holly Elf	Direct-to-video
2014	Achmed Saves America	Kevin	
2015	Barbie in Rock 'N Royals	Erika Juno	
2016	Hulk: Where Monsters Dwell	Vampire by Night / Nina Price, Bee Girl, Nurse	

==== Video games ====
Year	Title	Role
2014	Spider-Man Unlimited	Annie Parker
