= Kelly Sheridan =

Canadian voice actress (born 1977)

- Born: May 19, 1977 (age 49); Ottawa, Ontario, Canada
- Education: Simon Fraser University
- Occupation: Actress
- Years active: 1992–present
- Known for: Barbie in the Barbie film series Starlight Glimmer in My Little Pony: Friendship Is Magic; Sango in Inuyasha
- Website: www.kellysheridan.ca

Kelly Sheridan (born May 19, 1977) is a Canadian voice actress best known for being the voice for Barbie in the Barbie film series from 2001 to 2010 and from 2012 to 2015. She had also voiced in numerous animations and English-language dubs of Japanese anime, including as Sango in the English dub of the Inuyasha, Diana Lombard in Martin Mystery, Theresa in Class of the Titans, Starlight Glimmer in My Little Pony: Friendship Is Magic and Mammoth Mutt in Krypto the Superdog. She has been a member of Genus Theatre Company since August 2005.

== Biography ==
Sheridan grew up in Vancouver, Canada and studied at the Vancouver Youth Theatre. She attended Simon Fraser University and graduated with a BFA degree in theatre in 2001.

Before Mobile Suit Gundam SEED Destiny came out in English, on many of the anime websites, Sheridan had mistakenly received credit for voicing Stella Loussier. She was initially succeeded as the voice of Barbie by Diana Kaarina in 2010, beginning with Barbie: A Fashion Fairy Tale, but later returned to the role in Barbie in a Mermaid Tale 2 (2012). She continued to voice Barbie through 2015, when it was announced that Erica Lindbeck would replace her in 2016. Sheridan is married.

== Filmography ==
=== Anime ===
List of dubbing performances in anime
Year	Title	Role	Notes	Source
1993	Ranma ½	Ukyo Kuonji	Viz Media dub	
1995	Mega Man: Upon a Star	Akane Kobayashi		
2000	The Vision of Escaflowne	Hitomi Kanzaki	Bandai Entertainment dub	
2000–02	Cardcaptors	Nikki	Nelvana dub	
2001	Zoids: New Century	Leena Toros		
2002–06	Inuyasha	Sango (main role); First year girl (Episode 38)		
2002	Project ARMS	Mayae Tomoe		
2002	Trouble Chocolate	Red Bean		
2003–04	Megaman NT Warrior	Sal		
2003–04	Master Keaton	Yuriko Hiiraga		
2003	Boys Over Flowers	Tsukushi Makino		
2006	Powerpuff Girls Z	Princess Morbucks		
2008	Black Lagoon: The Second Barrage	Greenback Jane		
2009	Nana	Nana Komatsu		
2012	Kurozuka	Rai		
2012–13	Inuyasha: The Final Act	Sango (main role)	Viz Media dub	
2016–18	Beyblade Burst	Chiharu Aoi, Momoko Ogi, Ange Lopez, Marie Gorgeous, Deborah Murphy	Seasons 1 & 2	
2020–22	Yashahime: Princess Half-Demon	Sango (supporting role)		
2021	Hello Carbot	Sky		
2022–23	Dragon Quest: The Adventure of Dai	Leona		

=== Animation ===
List of voice performances in animation
Year	Title	Role	Notes	Source
1992	My Little Pony Tales	Melody		
1994	Conan and the Young Warriors	Brynne		
2000	X-Men: Evolution	Scarlet Witch		
2002	Kelly Dream Club	Barbie		
2003	Martin Mystery	Diana Lombard		
2005	Krypto the Superdog	Mammoth Mutt		
2005	Dragon Tales	Miss Tipps, Sycamore Tree		
2005	Bratz	Kaycee, Dagmar		
2006–2008	Class of the Titans	Theresa, Hesperia, Blonde Bickering Over Dress		
2007	Tom and Jerry Tales	Miss Shapely	Episode: "A Life Less Guarded"	
2008	A Kind of Magic	Willow, Cindy		
2010–2012	Hero: 108	Mystique Sonia, others		
2012–2022	Ninjago	Gayle Gossip, Female Care Worker, Female Owner		
2013	Inhumans	Crystal, Kalikya, Nahrees		
2013	Wolverine: Origin	Mrs. Hopkins, Elizabeth Howlett, Mary		
2014	Eternals	Sersi, Wasp, additional voices		
2014–2017	LoliRock	Praxina, Lyna, Queen of Ephedia, others	2 seasons	
2015–2019	My Little Pony: Friendship Is Magic	Starlight Glimmer, various characters		
2015	Dinotrux	Blayde, Ankylodump #2		
2017	My Little Pony: Equestria Girls -Mirror Magic	Starlight Glimmer, Mall Patron		
2018–2021	16 Hudson	Sara, Chef Maria, Sheila		

=== Film ===
==== Feature films ====
List of voice performances in feature films
Year	Title	Role	Notes	Source
2016	Sausage Party	Roberta Bun, Grape #2, Female Shopper #2		

==== Direct-to-video and television films ====
List of voice and dubbing performances in direct-to-video and television films
Year	Title	Role	Notes	Source
2001	Barbie in the Nutcracker	Barbie / Clara		
2002	Escaflowne	Hitomi Kanzaki		
2002	Barbie as Rapunzel	Barbie / Princess Rapunzel		
2003	Barbie of Swan Lake	Barbie / Princess Odette		
2004	My Scene: Jammin' In Jamaica	Barbie / Lexa		
2004	My Scene: Masquerade Madness	Barbie		
2004	Inuyasha the Movie: Affections Touching Across Time	Sango		
2004	Barbie as the Princess and the Pauper	Princess Anneliese, Erika, Narrator		
2004	Inuyasha the Movie: The Castle Beyond the Looking Glass	Sango		
2005	My Little Pony: Friends are Never Far Away	Cotton Candy, Coconut Grove		
2005	Barbie Fairytopia	Elina, Mermaid #2		
2005	Barbie and the Magic of Pegasus	Princess Annika, Troll/Wife #3		
2005	My Scene Goes Hollywood: The Movie	Barbie		
2005	Inuyasha the Movie: Swords of an Honorable Ruler	Sango		
2005	My Little Pony: A Very Minty Christmas	Cotton Candy		
2006	My Little Pony: The Princess Promenade	Cotton Candy		
2006	Barbie Fairytopia: Mermaidia	Elina		
2006	The Barbie Diaries	Barbie		
2006	My Little Pony Crystal Princess: The Runaway Rainbow	Cotton Candy		
2006	Barbie in the 12 Dancing Princesses	Princess Genevieve		
2007	Barbie Fairytopia: Magic of the Rainbow	Elina		
2007	Barbie as the Island Princess	Princess Rosella		
2007	Betsy Bubblegum's Journey Through Yummi-Land	Rachel Raspberry Swirl		
2008	My Little Pony: Pinkie Pie's Special Day	Cheerilee		
2008	Bratz Girlz Really Rock	Kaycee		
2008	Barbie in A Christmas Carol	Barbie		
2008	Barbie: Mariposa	Elina		
2008	Barbie and the Diamond Castle	Barbie / Princess Liana		
2009	Barbie Presents: Thumbelina	Barbie		
2009	Barbie and the Three Musketeers	Corinne		
2009	My Little Pony: Twinkle Wish Adventure	Cheerilee, Pony #1		
2009	Sing Along with Barbie	Barbie		
2010	Barbie in A Mermaid Tale	Merliah Summers		
2012	Barbie in A Mermaid Tale 2	Merliah Summers		
2012	Barbie: The Princess & the Popstar	Princess Victoria		
2013	Barbie in the Pink Shoes	Kristyn Farraday		
2013	Barbie: Mariposa & the Fairy Princess	Mariposa		
2013	Barbie & Her Sisters in A Pony Tale	Barbie		
2014	Barbie: The Pearl Princess	Princess Lumina		
2014	Barbie and the Secret Door	Princess Alexa		
2015	Barbie in Princess Power	Princess Kara (Super Sparkle)		
2015	Barbie in Rock 'N Royals	Princess Courtney		
2015	My Little Pony: Equestria Girls – Friendship Games	Indigo Zap		
2015	Barbie & Her Sisters in The Great Puppy Adventure	Barbie		

=== Video games ===
List of dubbing performances in video games
Year	Title	Role	Notes	Source
2004	Inuyasha: The Secret of the Cursed Mask	Sango		
2005	Inuyasha: Feudal Combat	Sango		
2009	Dynasty Warriors: Gundam 2	Roux Louka		
2011	Dynasty Warriors: Gundam 3	Roux Louka		
2020	Dragalia Lost	Ilia, Kuzunoha, Primal Brunhilda		
2025	Dispatch	Reporter B, Waitress		
