= Princess Power =

Children's animated television series

- Genre: Adventure
- Created by: Elise Allen
- Based on: Princesses Wear Pants by Savannah Guthrie and Allison Oppenheim
- Voices of: Trinity Jo-Li Bliss; Dana Heath; Luna Bella Zamora; Madison Calderon; Alanna Ubach; Andrew Rannells
- Theme music composer: Alana Da Fonseca; Kat Raio Rende; JP Rende
- Opening theme: "Princess Power Theme Song"
- Composers: Alana Da Fonseca; Kat Raio Rende; JP Rende
- Country of origin: United States
- Original language: English
- No. of seasons: 3
- No. of episodes: 45

Production
- Executive producers: Savannah Guthrie; Matthew Berkowitz; Kristin Cummings; Jennifer Twiner McCarron; Drew Barrymore; Ember Truesdell; Nancy Juvonen
- Running time: 14–34 minutes
- Production company: Flower Films

Original release
- Network: Netflix
- Release: January 30, 2023 – May 20, 2024

Princess Power is an American animated television series based on the 2005 book of the same name by Savannah Guthrie and Allison Oppenheim, which was created by Elise Allen. The series' first episode was released on YouTube on January 16, 2023. The series was released on Netflix on January 30, 2023. A second season was released on October 23, 2023. A third season was released on May 20, 2024.

== Premise ==
In each episode of Princess Power, the four princesses help the people in their lives as well as the "Frutizens" of their "Fruitdoms" with any problems they may have by using whimsical problem solving. While helping, they regularly sing songs about teamwork and being true to oneself.

== Characters ==
=== Main ===
- Trinity Jo-Li Bliss as Rita Raspberry
- Dana Heath as Kira Kiwi
- Luna Bella Zamora as Penelope "Penny" Pineapple
- Madison Calderon as Beatrice "Bea" Gertrude Ingeborg Blueberry
- Alanna Ubach as Miss Fussywiggles

=== Recurring ===
- Rita Moreno as Great Aunt Bussyboots
- Andrew Rannells as King Barton
- Jenna Ushkowitz as Queen Ryung
- Ian Loh as Joon and Jun
- Tan France as Sir Benedict
- Micaiah Chen as Ara
- Eric Bauza as Seung
- Ciera Payton as Queen Katia
- Anairis Quiñones as Karina
- Antonio Raul Corbo as Felipe
- Isabella Russo as Sena
- Jermaine Fowler as Sir Kaue

=== Minor ===
- Isabella Russo as Delia Dragonfruit
- Kimberly Brooks as Alana Apple
- Nevin Kar as Oliver
- Lily Sanfelippo as Lila Lemon
- Leela Ladnier as Omera and Oraida
- Antonio Raul Garcia as Royal Attendant
- Jack Stanton as Cyrus
- Jordan Preston Carter as Kiwi Boy
- Alanna Ubach as Gabriella Goldenrod, Pineappleite Woman, Kiwi-ian 1, Kiwi-ian 3, Blueberrian, Gracie, Kiwi-ian Kids, Dignitary 2, Dignitary 4, Fruitizen 1, Kiwi Vendor
- Eric Bauza as Sebastian, Jayden, Pineappleite Man, Dignitary 1, Dignitary 3, August, Fruitizens
- Madison Calderon as Georgina, Lemonite Kid, Kiwi-ian 4, Camilla
- Trinity Jo-Li Bliss as Minji
- Dana Heath as Ariana

=== Guest stars ===
- Savannah Guthrie as Susie Seedplanter
- Drew Barrymore as Headmistress Miranda
- Jenifer Lewis as Hilda

== Episodes ==
=== Series overview ===
Season	Episodes	Originally released
1	14	January 30, 2023
2	20	October 23, 2023
3	11	May 20, 2024

=== Season 1 (2023) ===
No. overall	No. in season	Title	Directed by	Written by	Original release date
1	1	"Unstoppable Unpoppable Princesses"	Donna Brockopp	Dena Diamond	January 30, 2023
2	2	"Princesses Garden Party"	Katya Rosario-Bowser	Gus Constantellis	January 30, 2023
3	3	"A Whale of a Princess Tale"	Donna Brockopp	Jack Monaco	January 30, 2023
4	4	"Princess Creation Station"	Unknown	Unknown	January 30, 2023
5	5	"Happy Princess Birthday Fussy"	Unknown	Unknown	January 30, 2023
6	6	"Princess Lights Out"	Unknown	Unknown	January 30, 2023
7	7	"Princess Shooting Stars"	Unknown	Unknown	January 30, 2023
8	8	"Princess Royal Portrait"	Unknown	Unknown	January 30, 2023
9	9	"A Princess Dad-Dilemma"	Unknown	Unknown	January 30, 2023
10	10	"The Great Princess Punchbowl Feastival"	Unknown	Unknown	January 30, 2023
11	11	"Princess Fun in the Sun"	Unknown	Unknown	January 30, 2023
12	12	"The Princesses and the Bees"	Unknown	Unknown	January 30, 2023
13	13	"Princesses Soccer Spectacular"	Unknown	Unknown	January 30, 2023
14	14	"A Prince in the Princess Pack"	Unknown	Unknown	January 30, 2023

=== Season 2 (2023) ===
No. overall	No. in season	Title	Directed by	Written by	Original release date
15	1	"The Princess and the Frosty Fruitdom Fiasco"	Unknown	Unknown	October 23, 2023
16	2	"Practice Makes Princess"	Unknown	Unknown	October 23, 2023
17	3	"Princess Farmers' Market"	Unknown	Unknown	October 23, 2023
18	4	"The Princess Get a Roommate"	Unknown	Unknown	October 23, 2023
19	5	"The Princess' Speech"	Unknown	Unknown	October 23, 2023
20	6	"Princess Suggestion Box"	Unknown	Unknown	October 23, 2023
21	7	"The Missing Princess"	Unknown	Unknown	October 23, 2023
22	8	"Princess All-Nighter"	Unknown	Unknown	October 23, 2023
23	9	"Little Shop of Princess Horrors"	Unknown	Unknown	October 23, 2023
24	10	"Princess Surprise Party"	Unknown	Unknown	October 23, 2023
25	11	"I Dig Being a Princess"	Unknown	Unknown	October 23, 2023
26	12	"The Princess Crown Cover Up"	Unknown	Unknown	October 23, 2023
27	13	"Princess Processional Professional"	Unknown	Unknown	October 23, 2023
28	14	"How to Be a Princess"	Unknown	Unknown	October 23, 2023
29	15	"Princess Bon Voyage"	Unknown	Unknown	October 23, 2023
30	16	"The Perfect Princess Welcome"	Unknown	Unknown	October 23, 2023
31	17	"Fussy and Scrumples' Princess Adventure"	Unknown	Unknown	October 23, 2023
32	18	"Princess Donation Distress"	Unknown	Unknown	October 23, 2023
33	19	"Busyboots and the Four Princesses"	Unknown	Unknown	October 23, 2023
34	20	"Princess Freaky Fruit-Day"	Unknown	Unknown	October 23, 2023

=== Season 3 (2024) ===
No. overall	No. in season	Title	Directed by	Written by	Original release date
35	1	"Four-Fruitdom Princess Coronation"	Unknown	Unknown	May 20, 2024
36	2	"Princess Camp Out Stake Out"	Unknown	Unknown	May 20, 2024
37	3	"Princess Pie Surprise"	Unknown	Unknown	May 20, 2024
38	4	"Princess Babysitters Club"	Unknown	Unknown	May 20, 2024
39	5	"Princess Royal Wedding"	Unknown	Unknown	May 20, 2024
40	6	"Princess Eco-Chase"	Unknown	Unknown	May 20, 2024
41	7	"Princess Nest Pest"	Unknown	Unknown	May 20, 2024
42	8	"Princess Bridge Over Troubled Water"	Unknown	Unknown	May 20, 2024
43	9	"The Princesses and the Beanstalk"	Unknown	Unknown	May 20, 2024
44	10	"Princess Friends Un-Forever"	Unknown	Unknown	May 20, 2024
45	11	"Princesses Seas the Day"	Unknown	Unknown	May 20, 2024

== Development ==
Development of Princess Power began in 2018 after it was optioned by Atomic Cartoons.

The show runners examined the aspects embodied by traditional animated princesses and look at how it might be possible to preserve the elements that draw so many people towards them, especially young children, but evolve that definition to prioritize being more active, empathetic, and to also just be yourself.

The fundamental DNA of the show revolves around the understanding that "Princess is a verb, not a noun". This crystallization came from showrunner Elise Allen after reading Princesses Wear Pants. The core message of the show is that "it's not what you wear but what you do that makes all the difference".

For executive producer Savannah Guthrie, It was important that, "You don't have to see a carbon copy of yourself. You just have to see an aspect that you can connect with and that tells you you're accepted". One example of this in the show is by Princess Beatrice having gay dads.

== Soundtrack ==
On January 27, 2023, songs from the first season were released on multiple streaming services.

All tracks are written by JP Rende, Kathryn Raio-Rende, and Alana Da Fonseca.

Princess Power (Soundtrack from the Netflix Series) by Princess Power
No.	Title	Length
1.	"Princess Power Theme Song (from the Netflix Series)"	3:59
2.	"Travel Song"	4:02
3.	"Gems in Your Crown"	1:03
4.	"Out in the Blue"	0:48
5.	"Practice Makes Princess"	1:04
6.	"Shooting Stars"	1:52
7.	"We Get Tougher"	1:00
8.	"Kiwi Kindness"	1:00
9.	"Doing It for the Fruitdom"	0:49
10.	"The Way We Play the Game"	1:08
