= Populazzi =

2011 novel by Elise Allen

- First edition
- Author: Elise Allen
- Language: English
- Publisher: Harcourt Children's Books
- Publication date: August 1, 2011
- Publication place: United States
- Pages: 400 pages
- ISBN: 0547481535

Populazzi is a 2011 young adult novel written by American author Elise Allen. The book was first published on August 1, 2011, through Harcourt Children's Books. The book's title is a portmanteau of the words "popular" and "paparazzi".

Film rights for the novel were optioned by Wind Dancer Films in 2011.

== Synopsis ==
The book follows Cara, an awkward young woman that decides to reinvent herself as the perfect teenage girl after moving to a new school. The idea seems like it would be all in good fun, but Cara soon finds herself in more trouble than she originally intended. When everything starts going terribly wrong, Cara must find a way to set things right.

== Reception ==
Critical reception for Populazzi was mixed to positive. The School Library Journal gave a mixed review, mostly praising the novel while commenting that some elements were "rather unrealistic". Kirkus Reviews also gave a mixed review that mentioned that elements of the book were unrealistic at times, stating that book's "attention to details" and "unflinching nature" "makes it all the more noticeable".
