= Barbie: Fairytopia =

2005 Barbie fantasy film

- DVD cover art
- Directed by: Walter P. Martishius; Will Lau
- Written by: Elise Allen; Diane Duane
- Based on: Fairytopia by Mattel
- Produced by: Nancy Bennett; Luke Carroll
- Starring: Kelly Sheridan
- Edited by: Sylvain Blais
- Music by: Eric Colvin
- Production companies: Mainframe Entertainment; Mattel Entertainment
- Distributed by: North America: Lions Gate Home Entertainment (Family Home Entertainment); Overseas: Universal Pictures Video; UK and Ireland: Right Entertainment
- Release dates: March 6, 2005 (Nickelodeon); March 8, 2005 (DVD)
- Running time: 71 minutes
- Countries: Canada; United States
- Language: English

Barbie: Fairytopia is a 2005 animated fantasy film directed by Walter P. Martishius and William Lau and written by Elise Allen and Diane Duane. The film first premiered on 6 March 2005, before releasing direct-to-video on VHS and DVD. It was distributed internationally through Universal Pictures Video and Entertainment Rights.

The fifth installment in the Barbie film series and the first to have an original storyline, it is based on the Fairytopia Mattel toy line introduced in 2003. The film follows Elina, a wingless flower fairy who goes on a journey to save the enchanted land of Fairytopia from the evil fairy Laverna.

The film is followed by two sequels; Barbie: Mermaidia and Barbie Fairytopia: Magic of the Rainbow and two spin-offs; Barbie: Mariposa and Barbie: Mariposa & the Fairy Princess.

== Plot ==
Barbie plays the role of Elina, a flower fairy who lives in Fairytopia with her puffball, Bibble. Unlike other fairies, Elina does not have wings, for which she gets frequently ridiculed.

One of Fairytopia's seven guardians, Topaz, is kidnapped by Laverna, the evil twin sister of Fairytopia's benevolent ruler, the Enchantress. Laverna reveals that she incapacitated her sister with poison and plans to capture all of Fairytopia's guardians. Meanwhile, Laverna's minions spread her mist-like formula all over Fairytopia, weakening all winged creatures.

Elina and Bibble awaken to see her flower home, Peony, and the other fairies in the meadow sick from Laverna's formula. Elina, Bibble, and their friend Dandelion seek help from the closest guardian, Azura. On entering a forest, Dandelion inhales some of Laverna's formula, and is forced to return home when she is unable to fly.

After being turned away when they ask to see Azura, Elina and Bibble sneak to Azura's house, where she is discovered by Azura. Seeing a rainbow in Elina's eye, Azura invites them inside. She explains that the rainbow in Elina's eyes means that she is destined for great things. Azura tells Elina that all of Fairytopia is in trouble because of Laverna, and in the morning, she will travel to speak to a dryad named Dahlia, a former follower of Laverna. Before she leaves, she asks Elina to take care of her magic necklace. As Azura is about to depart in the morning, she is kidnapped by a Fungus, one of Laverna's henchmen. Elina awakens and is accused of being responsible for Azura's disappearance, but gets rescued by Hue, a giant butterfly.

In Laverna's lair, the Fungi arrive with Azura, but Laverna is angered when she finds her necklace missing. The Fungi tell Laverna that a wingless fairy had it. Realizing that a wingless fairy would be unaffected by her formula, Laverna orders the Fungi to find Elina.

Hue and Elina are pursued by Laverna's firebirds. They evade them with the help of merman Prince Nalu, who gives them seaweed that allows them to breathe underwater. When the group finally reaches Dahlia's home, she is reluctant to help because the other guardians mistrust her. However, Elina convinces her to do the right thing. Dahlia tells Elina that Laverna has found a way to suck the powers from the fairy guardians' necklaces and transfer them to herself, stating that the "union point" would be its weakness.

The group arrives at Laverna's lair planning to find the union point, but Elina insists on going by herself, for she has Azura's necklace. While her friends cause a distraction, Elina makes it inside. She finds the guardians and her friends captured by the Fungi. Laverna agrees to let them go if Elina returns Azura's necklace, which she refuses. Laverna promises that she can give Elina wings in exchange for returning Azura's necklace. Hypnotized, Elina walks toward Azura with the necklace. The union point – a crystal embedded in Laverna's throne – absorbs the power from the guardians' necklaces. As Elina is about to return the necklace, Azura's words reach her, and she snaps out of her trance. Rejecting Laverna's offer, Elina hurls the necklace at the union point, shattering it. The guardians' power overwhelms Laverna, and she vanishes.

Back in the Magic Meadow, the fairies and the flowers are cured. Elina and her friends are visited by the recovered Enchantress. She thanks Elina and her friends for saving everyone, and rewards her with her magic necklace. The necklace magically bestows Elina with a pair of wings. Overjoyed, Elina and her friends go flying together.

== Cast ==
- Kelly Sheridan as Elina & Mermaid (played by Barbie) #2
- Lee Tockar as Bibble, Fungi
- Tabitha St. Germain as Dandelion, Topaz & Mermaid #1
- Kathleen Barr as Laverna, Pixie #2 & Pixie #4
- Venus Terzo as Azura
- Chiara Zanni as Dahlia & Pixie #3
- Mark Oliver as Hue
- Alessandro Juliani as Prince Kai (Nalu)
- Michael Dobson as Quill & Amethyst
- Scott McNeil as Ruby
- Brian Drummond as Larkspur
- Britt McKillip as Pixie #1
- Nancy Sorel as Pixie #5 & the Enchantress

== Distribution ==
Barbie: Fairytopia premiered on Nickelodeon in the United States on March 6, 2005 and was released on VHS and DVD on March 8, 2005. The film was distributed internationally through Universal Pictures Video and Entertainment Rights.

== See also ==
- Barbie Fairytopia: Mermaidia
- Barbie Fairytopia: Magic of the Rainbow
- Barbie: Mariposa
- List of Barbie films
