= Bates Motel =

Bates Motel may refer to:

== Structures ==
- Bates Motel, location in Robert Bloch's novel Psycho
- Bates Motel, location in the 1960 Alfred Hitchcock film Psycho
- Bates Motel, attraction in the Universal Studios Hollywood theme park
- Bates Motel, Universal Studios Florida, see list of former Universal Studios Florida attractions

== Titled works ==
- Bates Motel (film) (1987)
- Bates Motel (TV series) starring Vera Farmiga and Freddie Highmore (2013–17)

== Other ==
- Bates Motel, musical group, predecessor of Gleaming Spires
- Bates Motel (horse) (1979–2004), racehorse
