= Barbie in a Christmas Carol =

- DVD cover art
- Directed by: William Lau
- Written by: Elise Allen
- Produced by: Anita Lee
- Starring: Morwenna Banks; Kathleen Barr; Kelly Sheridan
- Edited by: Sylvain Blais
- Music by: Eric Colvin
- Production companies: Mattel Entertainment; Rainmaker Entertainment
- Distributed by: Kidtoon Films (theatrical); Universal Studios Home Entertainment (Note: Released under Entertainment Rights/Classic Media outside North America, with Right Entertainment distributing in the United Kingdom) (DVD)
- Release date: November 4, 2008
- Running time: 78 minutes
- Countries: Canada; United States
- Language: English
- Box office: $4,453,567 (U.S. DVD sales)

Barbie in a Christmas Carol is a 2008 CGI-animated Christmas film directed by William Lau and written by Elise Allen. Produced by Rainmaker Entertainment, it was given a limited theatrical release by Kidtoon Films on November 1, 2008 and was later released to DVD 3 days later. It premiered on British and Irish television via its Nick Jr. regional variant on December 23, 2011. The 14th entry in the Barbie film series, it is based on Charles Dickens's 1843 novel and features the voice of Kelly Sheridan as Barbie, with Morwenna Banks as Eden Starling (a female version of Ebenezer Scrooge played by Barbie). It is the 2nd Christmas-themed Barbie film, following Barbie in the Nutcracker, despite being marketed as Barbie’s "First Holiday Movie" on the DVD cover.

== Plot ==
Barbie tells the story to her little sister, Kelly, who is reluctant to go to a Christmas Eve charity ball instead of spending the holiday at home with their family.

Eden Starling is a glamorous, star soprano and owner of the Gads Hill Theater in Victorian London, as well as an arrogant, self-centered diva who hates Christmas. She is frequently accompanied by her snooty cat, Chuzzlewit. The theater's employees—a stage magician, Freddy (the film's version of Fred), twin ballerinas Ann and Nan, clown Maurice, and costume designer, Catherine Beadnell (the film's version of Bob Cratchit)—are reprimanded by Eden for their festive moods, and she refuses to work on Christmas Day, ruining their holiday plans. Catherine, who is Eden's childhood best friend, tries to convince her otherwise, to no avail.

That night, Eden is visited by the ghost of her late Aunt Marie (the film's version of Jacob Marley), bound by the chains forged from her misdeeds in life. Marie warns Eden that her actions are leading her down the same path and suffer in the afterlife as she does. She tells Eden that she will be visited by three spirits in an attempt to help her change her ways over the course of three nights.

Eden is first visited by the cheerful Spirit of Christmas Past, who takes Eden back in time to her childhood. As a young girl, Eden was forced to study music under the domineering Aunt Marie with little rest. Eden secretly sneaks out of the house to celebrate Christmas with Catherine and her family, only to be interrupted by the arrival of an enraged Marie, spoiling the festivities. After the incident, Eden was forbidden from celebrating Christmas, and Marie further instilled her self-centered views into her niece.

Eden is visited next by the jolly Spirit of Christmas Present, who takes Eden to the theater where she learns of the other performers' disdain for her stinginess. The Spirit then shows Eden that Catherine is visiting a local orphanage. Catherine generously gifts them clothes and is particularly close to a crippled orphan named Tammy (the film's version of Tiny Tim). Eden's heart softens after witnessing the scene but becomes concerned when the owner tells Catherine that the orphanage will likely be closed due to a lack of funding.

Finally, Eden is visited by the mysterious yet kindly Spirit of Christmas Future. Eden is shocked to find her future self living in poverty. The Spirit explains that Eden had fired her employees, including Catherine, after they'd shown up late to work one Christmas. Afterwards, the acts hired by Eden to replace them failed to impress the audience, leading Eden to lose her fame and fortune. Eden then visits Catherine, who is now an accomplished fashion designer, at her new store for help. Catherine explains that after Eden fired her, she left the country to find work. Returning months later, her business was financially stable and ready to adopt Tammy, but Catherine was dismayed to find the orphanage had closed with the children, including Tammy, gone. Since that day, Catherine has become disillusioned with Christmas while focusing only on advancing her career, even adopting Eden's outlook on life and treating her workers cruelly. Catherine then refuses to aid the impoverished Eden and throws her out of her shop.

Horrified, Eden begs the spirits for another chance to redeem herself and alter the future; after which she awakens back in her bedroom on Christmas morning. Filled with newfound joy, Eden arrives at the theater and gives gifts to all her employees as well as allowing them to take the holiday off, which changes their outlook on her. At Eden's urging, Catherine takes her to the orphanage, which Eden promises to financially support. Freddy arrives with a carriage—which the spirits magically turn into a sleigh for it to move through the snow—and Catherine and Eden ride off with him to spend Christmas with Catherine's family. The orphans wave them goodbye, joined by the unseen ghost of Aunt Marie, now free of her chains.

The story instills Kelly with a new sense of generosity. Barbie's friend Nikki comes in to remind them they are late, and Barbie and Kelly leave for the event to celebrate Christmas together.

== Cast ==
- Barbie – Kelly Sheridan
- Eden Starling – Morwenna Banks
  - Eden Starling (singing) – Melissa Lyons
  - young Eden – Prudence Edwards
  - young Eden (singing) – Leanne Araya
- Nikki/Catherine/Young Catherine – Kandyse McClure
  - Catherine (singing) – Shauntia Fleming
- Aunt Marie – Pam Hyatt
- Freddy – Luke Smith
  - Freddy (Singing) – Anthony Fett
- Spirit Of Christmas Past/Seamstress/Baby – Tabitha St. Germain
  - Spirit Of Christmas Past (singing) – Leanne Araya
- Spirit Of Christmas Present/Mrs Dorrit/Chuzzlewitt – Kathleen Barr
  - Spirit Of Christmas Present (Singing) – Lisa Roth
- Spirit Of Christmas Future – Gwynyth Walsh
  - Spirit Of Christmas Future (Singing) – Kelly Bixby
- Kelly/Tammy – Amelia Henderson
  - Tammy (Singing) – Michael Ann Angone
- Maurice/Orphanage Head – Fabrice Grower
  - Maurice (Singing) – Tim Fett
- Ann/Nan – Shannon Chan-Kent
  - Ann/Nan (Singing) – Leanne Araya
- Mrs. Beadnell – Melissa Lloyd
- Jacob – Morgan Roff
- Hypnotist/Boz – Terry Klassen
- Singing Voices – Go Children's Leanne Araya

== Promotion ==
To promote the film, an exclusive interview for Amazon.com featuring Barbie (voiced by Kelly Sheridan) was released, called "Barbie Talks About Her Holiday Movie".

== Reception ==
Paul Mavis of DVD Talk said, "Barbie is sweet and knowing, as usual, and little girls might even get a much-needed message about the true spirit of Christmas, slipped in among the somewhat herky-jerky CGI animation. An excellent stocking stuffer for little girls. I recommend Barbie in A Christmas Carol."

== Home media ==
The film was released on November 4, 2008, and grossed $6,626,008 in the U.S. DVD market.

== Adaptation ==
Based on the 1843 book A Christmas Carol by Charles Dickens, the film was adapted into a storybook written by Mary Man-Kong and published by Golden Books (a division of Random House).

== See also ==
- List of Barbie films
- List of Christmas films
- Adaptations of A Christmas Carol
- Barbie (media franchise)
- Barbie in the Nutcracker
- Mickey's Christmas Carol
- A Christmas Carol, 2009 film
