= Barbie Fairytopia: Magic of the Rainbow =

2007 Barbie fantasy film

- DVD cover art
- Directed by: William Lau
- Written by: Elise Allen
- Based on: Fairytopia by Mattel
- Produced by: Luke Carroll; Tiffany Shuttleworth
- Starring: Kelly Sheridan
- Edited by: Sylvain Blais; Michael Dowding; Cassandra Mackay
- Music by: Eric Colvin
- Production companies: Mainframe Entertainment; Mattel Entertainment
- Distributed by: Universal Pictures Video
- Release date: March 17, 2007 (DVD)
- Running time: 75 minutes
- Countries: Canada; United States
- Language: English

Barbie Fairytopia: Magic of the Rainbow, also known as Barbie: Magic of the Rainbow, is a 2007 animated fantasy film directed by William Lau and written by Elise Allen that released direct-to-video on March 17, 2007. It was distributed internationally through Universal Pictures Video.

It is the tenth installment in the Barbie film series and the third film in the Barbie: Fairytopia trilogy. The film follows Elina, who is chosen to attend fairy school at the Crystal Palace as an apprentice of the Guardian fairy Azura. Elina and the six other apprentices will prepare for the annual spring ritual, the "Flight of Spring", that produces the first rainbow of the season. The antagonist of the series, Laverna, is planning to stop the rite and plunge Fairytopia into ten years of winter. Elina must work together with the apprentices to defeat Laverna and save Fairytopia.

== Plot ==
Elina is now famous for defeating Laverna twice. She is invited to be Azura's apprentice at the Crystal Palace, where she will learn the ritual that brings the first rainbow of spring to life. Elina meets the other apprentices: Linden, an oread fairy who can talk to animals; Shimmer, a tiny and arrogant pigtail pixie; Lumina, a moon fairy who foresees the future; Sunburst, a sparkle fairy who dislikes Elina; Faben, a fairy with narcissistic traits; and Glee, a wood nymph who becomes Elina's best friend. Glee also has a puffball, Dizzle, who falls in love with Bibble. Unknown to Elina, Laverna, the envious sister of the Enchantress, plans to prevent the annual spring ritual the "Flight of Spring" and plunge Fairytopia into a 10-year winter.

Elina does a good job in the first classes, earning her more resentment from Sunburst. Elina and Sunburst fight, getting them both reprimanded by Azura. Laverna leaves her exile and pretends to be a bewitched frog, deceiving Elina and Linden, who reverse the spell and free her. The two return to the palace to warn everyone, but the guardians don't believe that Laverna is loose because she left a decoy at the bogs, though Azura heeds their warning. Laverna finds Sunburst in the garden, captures her and uses a spell to take on her appearance in order to enter the palace. With Sunburst's appearance, Laverna poisons all the guardians without anyone suspecting her.

With the guardians in comas, the Enchantress gathers the apprentices and informs them they will need to perform the "Flight of Spring", even though they are not fully trained. The apprentices practice the steps of the "Flight of Spring", a magical dance that, only when correctly executed, can awaken the magical rainbow that marks the end of winter. During the flight, a small slip-up causes Elina to discover that the Sunburst is actually Laverna; at this moment she stops, with the help of Bibble and Dizzle, sets out to find the real Sunburst.

Since the weakness of sparkle fairies is water, Elina and her friends head to the river where they find Sunburst imprisoned in a magic bubble. Elina heads back to the garden bringing the real Sunburst with her. Laverna is forced to give up her disguise but demands the Enchantress hand over the crown or she will prevent the rite from being completed. The Enchantress hands over the crown and is imprisoned. Laverna does not keep her promise and shoots a magical ray to destroy the rainbow.

Elina steps in front of Laverna's magical ray and is helped by the other six apprentices, forming a spectrum with the seven colors of the rainbow that strike Laverna. Laverna loses her powers and is destroyed. The Enchantress and the Guardians are freed from the spells, and Elina's wings become rainbow-colored. The rainbow finally appears, ushering in spring, and with their mission accomplished, Elina and Bibble can return to their home in the Magic Meadow.

== Cast ==
- Kelly Sheridan as Elina, a flower fairy who is the main protagonist in the Barbie Fairytopia trilogy. She is Azura's apprentice and represents the color blue.
- Lee Tockar as Bibble, Elina's puffball / Fungus #1 & #2, Laverna's henchmen
- Kathleen Barr as Laverna, the main antagonist in the Barbie: Fairytopia trilogy. Her twin sister is the Enchantress.
- Christopher Gaze as Fungus Maximus, Laverna's main henchman
- Tabitha St. Germain as Dandelion, Elina's best friend in the Magic Meadow / Topaz, Guardian of the Magic Meadow. Her apprentice is Linden.
- Venus Terzo as Azura, Guardian of the Fairy Town region and Elina's mentor / Pixie # 1
- Andrew Francis as Linden, an oread fairy who is friends with Elina and is Topaz's apprentice. He represents the color yellow.
- Sharon Alexander as Sunburst, a Sparkle fairy and Tourmaline's apprentice. She represents the color orange.
- Peter New as Tourmaline, Guardian of an unknown province of Fairytopia and Sunburst's mentor.
- Nancy Sorel as The Enchantress, the ruler of Fairytopia and the twin sister of Laverna.
- Saffron Henderson as Lumina, a moon fairy who is Sapphire's apprentice. She represents the color indigo.
- Andrea Libman as Shimmer, a pigtail pixie who is the apprentice of Ruby. She represents the color red. / Pixie #2
- Lalainia Lindbjerg as Glee, a wood nymph who is friends with Elina and is Emerald's apprentice. She represents the color green.
- Alistair Abell as Faban, a fairy based on Narcissus. He is Amethyst's apprentice and represents the color violet.
- Cathy Weseluck as Dizzle, Glee's puffball and Bibble's love interest.

== Soundtrack ==
A soundtrack for the film Barbie Fairytopia: Magic of the Rainbow (Music Inspired by the Movie) was released on March 13, 2007. Composed by Robbie Roth, it features songs inspired by the film and an instrumental track. The track list is as follows:

1. "The Magic of the Rainbow"
2. "It's Nasty Being a Toad"
3. "The Flight of Spring"
4. "Could There Be Anything as Beautiful as Me?"
5. "Learn Your Lessons"
6. "The Magic of the Rainbow (Instrumental Mix)"
7. "Luminessence"
8. "You Are the Most"
9. "I Must Be Strong"
10. "The Flight of Spring (Reprise)"

== Reception ==
In 2007, Barbie Fairytopia: Magic of the Rainbow won the Leo Awards for "Best Animation Program or Series" awarded to producers Luke Carroll and Tiffany Shuttleworth; and "Best Overall Sound in an Animation Program or Series" awarded to Peter Eliuk, Pat Haskill, Christine McLeod, Maureen Murphy, and Gordon Sproule. The director, William Lau, was nominated for "Best Direction Animated Program or Series". In 2008, the film was nominated at the Daytime Emmy Awards for "Outstanding Achievement in Music Direction and Composition". The film was also nominated at the ELAN Awards in Canada for "Best Feature-Length Animated Production" and "Best Direction in a Feature-Length Animated Production".

Nancy Davis Kho of Common Sense Media gave Barbie Fairytopia: Magic of the Rainbow three out of five stars. Kho says that it was a "simple story with positive messages, lush animation."

== Marketing ==
A range of Barbie Fairytopia: Magic of the Rainbow merchandise was released under film title. Dolls based on Elina include the Rainbow Lights Fairy, a doll with light up wings; the Elina (Fluttering Wings) Doll, featuring battery powered moving wings; and the Rainbow Adventure Elina Doll & DVD Game, which allowed children to use the Elina doll as a remote control while play a Fairytopia themed DVD Game. Glee, Lumina, and Sunburst dolls were also released. The various dolls were marketed via television commercials. Mattel also released the 'Fairyoke Wings Set", which included wearable wings that played music, and a wand that acted as a microphone. Other versions of the play line dolls and miscellaneous merchandise under the film's brand were also sold and are documented informally online by doll collectors.

== See also ==
- List of Barbie films
