= Barbie: Mariposa and Her Butterfly Fairy Friends =

2008 Barbie fantasy film

- DVD cover art
- Directed by: Conrad Helten
- Written by: Elise Allen
- Based on: Fairytopia by Mattel
- Produced by: Luke Carroll; Tiffany J. Shuttleworth
- Starring: Chiara Zanni
- Edited by: Sylvain Blais
- Music by: Eric Colvin
- Production companies: Mattel Entertainment; Rainmaker Entertainment
- Distributed by: Universal Pictures Home Entertainment
- Release dates: February 26, 2008 (DVD); March 3, 2008 (Nickelodeon)
- Running time: 74 minutes
- Language: English

Barbie: Mariposa and Her Butterfly Fairy Friends, also known as Barbie: Mariposa, is a 2008 animated fantasy film directed by Conrad Helten and written by Elise Allen. The tagline of the film is "The most beautiful thing you can be is yourself".

The film follows Mariposa (voiced by Chiara Zanni), a butterfly fairy on a Hero's Journey to save Queen Marabella, and her kingdom, from the evil fairy Henna and the evil flying creatures – Skeezites.

The 12th installment in the Barbie film series, Barbie: Mariposa is a spin-off of the Barbie: Fairytopia trilogy. The film has a Spanish influence, with the titular character's name being Spanish for 'butterfly'. It is the first film in the series to not feature Kelly Sheridan's Barbie as the main role, she instead reprises her role as the character Elina of the Fairytopia trilogy.

== Plot ==
The film opens with Elina, the protagonist of the Fairytopia films, as she tells the story of Mariposa to her puffball Bibble. She tells Bibble that Flutterfield, an island on the edge of Fairytopia, is populated by butterfly fairies (fairies with the wings of a butterfly). It is cut off from the mainland as it is surrounded by flying nocturnal creatures named Skeezites, who eat butterfly fairies. The fairies used to hide from the Skeezites at night, until a fairy named Marabella arrived with the power of light. The lights kept the Skeezites away from Flutterfield as long as she lived, and the fairies made Marabella their queen.

Mariposa, the main character, is introverted, preferring reading and stargazing to attending social events. She feels as though she does not belong in Flutterfield. She and her best friend, Willa, work for two upper-class fairies; Rayna and Rayla. One night, all four fairies attend a royal ball, with the sisters wishing to catch the attention of the mysterious and charming Prince Carlos. Mariposa decides not to go into the palace, instead reading her book outside – where she crashes into a male fairy who is reading the same book as her. They connect over the book being their respective favourites and that they are both introverts. He tells her his name is Andreas.

The next morning, Mariposa wakes up to the voices of guards and finds Andreas in her room. He tells her he is Prince Carlos and that the Queen has been poisoned by a mythical poison named Illios, meaning she will die in two days. Her death will cause the lights to go out and allow the Skeezites to attack Flutterfield again. He gives her a map to the antidote, telling her that it is up to her to find it and save the Queen if he is captured by the guards. Mariposa goes to work and finds out from Rayla that the Prince has been locked up for his own protection. Mariposa tells Rayna and Rayla about the map and the three fairies agree to follow it together. Willa arrives to work and finds a note from Mariposa, telling her to contact Prince Carlos.

The fairies encounter Skeezites as night falls and they eat the map. Mariposa remembers there is a rising sun on the map, and they head due east following the direction of the Archer constellation.

As Willa is trying to find Prince Carlos at the palace, she spots Queen Marabella's attendant, Henna, poisoning her with a tonic and saying she wishes to take over Flutterfield. Willa manages to steal the key to Prince Carlos' cage from his guard and tells the Prince about Henna.

Mariposa, Rayna and Rayla meet a flying rabbit named Zinzie, who loves fluttercorn. Zinzie leads them to a mermaid statue at the center of the Bewilderness. Mariposa realises it's a clue and they need to find the mermaid on the statue.

Willa and Prince Carlos follow Henna to a cave full of Skeezites, where they find her promising them fairies to eat that night. Henna controls the Skeezites by pouring a potion onto thistleburst.

Mariposa, Rayna, Rayla and Zinzie eat a magical reed that allows them to breathe underwater. They meet the mermaids Anemone and Coral, who will give them information in exchange for a 'conchal shell'. The mini-merfolk who use the shell as a pillow wake up due to the interference and the crying awakens a sea beast. After escaping the sea beast, the mermaids tell them how to find the Cave of Reflections.

The entrance to the Cave of Reflections is guarded by Skeezites. The fairies outwit the Skeezites and make it to the cave. There, they meet the cave fairy who makes the fairies choose, one-by-one, who should stay behind. Along the way, the reflections gain their own personality and taunt them. Once only Rayna and Mariposa are left, Rayna tells Mariposa she should be the one who continues, despite protests from her reflection. They reach the top of the cave, which opens up to the night sky, and the cave fairy tells Mariposa that one star holds the antidote. Her reflection tries to mislead her again, but Mariposa chooses a tiny star that the Archer constellation points toward, saying that it doesn't have to fit in with the other stars to be important. Mariposa is rewarded with the antidote (in the form of a lily flower) and new, bigger, sparkly, deep pink wings.

Back in Flutterfield, Prince Carlos and Willa reveal Henna's evil plan, and they begin to battle the Skeezites with thistleburst. Mariposa and the sisters arrive and Mariposa is shocked to discover Henna is behind the poisoning. Henna tries to stop Mariposa from reaching the Queen with the antidote, but Mariposa manages to get the lily flower to the Queen and heal her just as her lights are fading out. Henna flies away with the Skeezites.

The Queen awards the fairies with a ceremony, and presents them with flower crowns. Mariposa realises that she belongs in Flutterfield.

== Cast ==
- Kelly Sheridan as Elina (played by Barbie)
- Lee Tockar as Bibble / Skeezite #2
- Cathy Weseluck as Zinzie / Dizzle / Fairy Speck
- Chiara Zanni as Mariposa
- Tabitha St. Germain as Willa / Coral / Flutterpixie
- Kathleen Barr as Rayna
- Erin Mathews as Rayla
- Nicole Oliver as Henna
- Alessandro Juliani as Prince Carlos
- Alistair Abell as Lord Gastrous
- Terry Klassen as Sheezite #1
- Jane Barr as Anemone / Queen Marabella
- David Kaye as Royal Guard

== Release ==
Barbie: Mariposa released on DVD in the United States on February 26, 2008, and in the United Kingdom on March 3, 2008. The film premiered on Nickelodeon in the United States on March 2, 2008.

The DVD includes bonus features: "Flutterfield Scavenger Hunt", and "Flutterpixie Dress Up".

== Reception ==
Barbie: Mariposa won 3rd place for the "KIDS FIRST! Best Award - Feature Film, Ages 5-8" at the Coalition for Quality Children's Media KIDS FIRST! Film Festival 2008. The film was also nominated for a Leo Award for "Best Animation Program or Series" in 2008.

== Marketing ==
Mattel released a range of merchandise, and held events to promote Barbie: Mariposa. The main doll that was marketed was the Barbie Mariposa Magic Wings Doll. The doll had purple wings that could open up into pink sparkly wings by pressing a button on the dolls back. This doll was marketed with a television commercial prior to the movies release.

The Barbie Mariposa line also included a Willa doll; color change Rayna and Rayla dolls; a Prince doll; a Queen doll; the Flutterpixies dolls assortment; and mini-character giftsets. Other items in the toy collection included a Mariposa 'styling head', and wearable 'karaoke wings' Mattel also released Barbie Mariposa dress-up sets including glittery butterfly wings and fashion accessories including a tiara, fake make-up in a Butterfly shaped tote, and pretend jewelry. Random House, Scholastic and Reader's Digest released a range of coloring, activity and story books based on the film. Oregon Scientific and Mattel released the Barbie Mariposa Learning Laptop, which featured a LCD screen and an ALPHA numeric keyboard. It contained eight learning games including counting, colors, shapes, and ABCs.

Mattel co-hosted a "Butterfly Ball" on February 22, 2008, at the Children's Hospital Los Angeles with the Lollipop Theater Network. The event had a butterfly fairy garden theme. The children attending enjoyed an advance viewing of the DVD and were gifted with special EB Butterfly Necklaces designed by actors Courteney Cox and David Arquette to support the EB (Epidermolysis Bullosa) Medical Research Foundation. An actress dressed as Mariposa announced a $20,000 donation to the Lollipop Theater Network and interacted with the children.

== Sequel ==
=== Barbie: Mariposa & the Fairy Princess (2013) ===
Barbie: Mariposa & the Fairy Princess is the 2013 sequel, also serving as the conclusion of the Fairytopia films franchise. The film has a modernised animation style and features pop music, setting it apart from the previous film. The titular character Mariposa, is now voiced by Kelly Sheridan and her character has strawberry blonde hair, different to the original cool blonde hair with pink highlights. The plot centers around Mariposa being sent to the fairy kingdom of Shimmervale to be an ambassador for Flutterfield, in hopes to bring peace between the two kingdoms. The film focuses on the friendship between Mariposa and Princess Catania, a Crystal Fairy, as they discover a plot by the antagonist Gwyllion to destroy Shimmervale. The two fairies must work together to save the kingdom.

== See also ==
- List of Barbie films
- Barbie: Fairytopia
