= Barbie (media franchise) =

Multimedia franchise featuring Barbie

- The official logo from 1959 until 1975; re-used since 2009
- Created by: Mattel, Inc.
- Original work: Barbie by Ruth Handler
- Owner: Mattel
- Years: 1984–present

Print publications
- Book: 400+ (multiple publishers)
- Comics: 5 (Dell Comics); 119 (Marvel Comics)

Films and television
- Films: 44 (CGI/computer-animated films); 1 (live-action film)
- Short film: 4
- Web series: Barbie: Life in the Dreamhouse; Barbie: Dreamtopia; Barbie Vlogger; Barbie's Dreamworld; Barbie: Life in the City
- Animated series: Barbie Dreamhouse Adventures; Barbie: It Takes Two; Barbie: A Touch of Magic
- Television specials: Barbie and the Rockers: Out of this World; Barbie and the Sensations: Rockin' Back to Earth

Games
- Video games: List of Barbie video games

Miscellaneous
- Toys: List of Barbie's friends and family
- Related: My Scene

Official website
- Official website (archived, main link currently redirects to a Slovak web hosting service)

Barbie is an American multimedia franchise created by Mattel based on the eponymous fashion doll created by its co-founder, Ruth Handler. It began with the release of an eponymous video game in 1984 and has since been featured in more video games, a film series and in other media formats across technologies like television and the Internet. It is one of the highest-grossing media franchises of all time and has been referred to among fans as the "Barbie Cinematic Universe".

The film series were released direct-to-video from 2001 and aired regularly on Nickelodeon as television specials in the United States from 2002, with both running until early 2017. Since mid-2017, beginning with Barbie Dolphin Magic, Mattel revamped them into streaming television films, branded or marketed them as animated "specials" with a reduced 1-hour video length as opposed to the feature films beforehand and moved them to streaming media services, Netflix, but also including Amazon Prime Video, Google Play and Apple TV+. These films released from late 2017 onwards could still be released on home video formats, locally, or get picked up for television broadcast in multiple countries and regions/territories. Aside from the film series, Barbie has been featured in other media formats, including two animated direct-to-video specials in Barbie and the Rockers: Out of This World and its sequel, Barbie and the Sensations: Rockin' Back to Earth, both in 1987, web series like Barbie: Life in the Dreamhouse, Barbie: Vlogger, Barbie Dreamtopia, Barbie's Dreamworld and Barbie: Life in the City, television shows like Barbie Dreamhouse Adventures, Barbie: It Takes Two and Barbie: A Touch of Magic, a live-action film and an interactive film.

== Origins ==
Barbie debuted on March 9, 1959, at the American International Toy Fair (now the North American International Toy Fair) and it was well received locally in the United States, sparking a revolution in the toy industry. Since then, numerous likenesses of the doll were released which later evolved into what is now considered as "Barbie's friends and family" and clothing and accessories to accompany them. Various print hardcover and comic books starring Barbie were also released through partnerships and/or deals with Dell Comics, Marvel Comics and currently Papercutz.

In the 1980s, the net popularity and sales of Barbie dolls in the toy market began to decline and struggled further in 2001 when MGA Entertainment introduced a line of dolls under the name Bratz, whose sexualized characters contrasted with Barbie's older, chaste image. Mattel therefore attempted to overhaul the Barbie brand to keep the toy relevant to consumers in the modern age by bringing in consultants and conducting research on key market groups. Mattel consultants initially considered reducing Barbie's breast size, but later claimed that the doll's figure could not be changed because "being consistent is one of her biggest strengths". Mattel's team also considered targeting market audiences of career women and their daughters by introducing lines of Doctor or Lawyer Barbies. However, Mattel's research showed that girls were spending more time online than playing with physical dolls. Therefore, targeted career Barbies were discarded in favor of looking for more interactive platforms through online or digital media.

In response, Mattel began adapting Barbie into various facets of media and entertainment beyond the television advertisement of its dolls and related accessories (which was a prolific marketing strategy in the past). For the first 16 entries in the film series, Barbie is featured as a virtual actress playing the main character, and often being portrayed as a modern girl telling the story to one of her sisters or a younger friend – as a parable to present affairs. Scholars examining how the Barbie films differ from other princess narratives have concluded that Mattel intentionally attempted to remediate its brand based on feminist criticisms through storytelling in the films.

== History ==
In 1987, Mattel produced two television specials with DIC Animation City and Saban Productions; Barbie and the Rockers: Out of This World and its sequel Barbie and the Sensations: Rockin' Back to Earth, both featuring Barbie as the leader of a rock band (often seen as being Mattel's answer to rival fashion doll Jem from Hasbro); Mattel had previously avoided media projects for Barbie “for fear of giving Barbie a cartoon-type personality and not leaving anything to the imagination”. Though often speculated to be potential pilots for a regular Barbie series, no series ever happened. Instead, both specials were released direct-to-video by Hi-Tops Video, the children's division of Media Home Entertainment. Another planned series for the fall of 1987 by the newly formed Mattel division MTS Entertainment was, unusually, a newsmagazine aimed at kids and teenagers, intended to feature both live-action and animated segments. Due to a flooded syndication market for children, the series never progressed, beyond a presentation at the 1987 NATPE convention.

With the boom of home video marketing at the time, Mattel launched an eponymous in-house entertainment division in 2001 and began the creation of the Barbie films with the direct-to-video release of Barbie in the Nutcracker. The films initially revolved around Barbie being re-imagined as a princess and eventually expanded into various worlds of fashion and fantasy. A primary benefit of this strategy revolved around marketing, as Mattel could sell dolls specific to each film separately from the video sales and merchandise related to props, costumes and sets from the films.

Tim Kilpin, then-senior vice-president for girls marketing at Mattel, stated: "What you see now are several different Barbie worlds anchored by content and storytelling. A girl can understand what role Barbie is playing, what the other characters are doing, and how they interrelate. That's a much richer level of story that leads to a richer level of play." The strategy worked as U.S. Barbie sales, led by the princess line, "increased by two percent in 2006, saving Mattel's bottom line at a time when its worldwide share of the toy market was declining." Within the films, Mattel included performances by well-known companies and orchestras, such as the London Symphony Orchestra, the Czech Philharmonic and the New York City Ballet. These associations could have been included as an enrichment strategy on behalf of Mattel's marketing team to help the films be seen as educational.

Canadian animation studio Arc Productions, Inc. produced the first non-Barbie-film production for Mattel in 2011, a web series called Barbie: Life in the Dreamhouse which debuted on the official Barbie website and YouTube on May 11, 2012, and concluded on November 27, 2015. The web series later spawned two television specials which were broadcast in the U.S. on Nickelodeon. Impressed, Mattel gave them four Barbie films to produce, enlisting them as the third production partner for the films after Mainframe Studios (at the time known as "Rainmaker Entertainment") and Technicolor.

Israeli animation studio Snowball Studios, with support from the Jerusalem Film and Television Fund, produced another web series, this time created by Nickelodeon alum Julia Pistor, for Mattel Playground Productions known as Barbie: Dreamtopia. This series of 2-minute to 4-minute shorts launched on May 21, 2016, by Mattel's newest company, Mattel Creations, on YouTube's affiliate platform, YouTube Kids. The web shorts series later spawned an eponymous television film (distributed by Universal Pictures Home Entertainment and broadcast on television in over 5 countries and regions/territories), one web-based special and a 26-episode web series – therefore becoming the first web-exclusive Barbie media franchise. This would be the catalyst for scholars and enthusiasts alike to notice Mattel heavily invested and involved in releasing more related Barbie web series and miniseries bundles on YouTube and its variants; YouTube Kids and YouTube Shorts.

Through the short video bundles on YouTube, Mattel also provided a platform for Barbie to give its audience a look into her fictional life while trying to educate them along the way. With a YouTube channel having over 11 million subscribers, Mattel introduced Barbie as a YouTuber through a web series called Barbie Vlogger (or Barbie Vlogs), uploading its first video on June 19, 2015. Julia Pistor, who collaborated on the series as an executive producer and writer, stated: "Barbie is conscious of language and words; she talks about intention and she's self-reflective. While we might use words that kids sometimes need to look up, we try to be true to Barbie being a 17-year-old influencer." By giving a self-reflective nature to Barbie's character, this would allow her to discuss difficult topics (such as mental health and racism) in such a way that it inspires its audience to think about and discuss those topics as well.

With the success of its online platforms, Mattel would continue to produce web series and mini-series on YouTube and its variants. Beginning with Barbie: Dolphin Magic in 2017, the media franchise as a whole moved over to streaming media services, Netflix, also including Amazon Prime Video, Google Play and Apple TV+, with Mattel still maintaining the possibility of linear television broadcast agreements. In addition, Mattel signed an agreement on May 1, 2020, with Arts Music, Inc., a then-newest record label of Warner Music Group, to make thousands of songs from their brand portfolio – including Barbie – available through online music streaming services. The agreement began taking effect a week later when the soundtrack albums tied to their related productions are made available through WMG's distribution label, ADA Worldwide. Mattel would extend its collaboration with Netflix on October 21, 2022, 4 days before the American debut of the franchise's inaugural interactive "special", Barbie: Epic Road Trip, which would also see the pre-2017 film catalogue previously held by Universal made available occasionally through the streaming service.

== Films ==
After the broadcast syndication of 2 television specials in 1987, numerous video game releases in the 1990s and the rise of home video marketing, Mattel collaborated with Canadian company, Mainframe Entertainment (currently Mainframe Studios) to produce its first computer-animated feature-length film, Barbie in the Nutcracker, based on E. T. A. Hoffmann's classic tale and Tchaikovsky's accompanying ballet music, for a 2001 release through Family Home Entertainment. Mainframe continues to produce the majority of films in the series. The first decade was dominated by films based on pre-existing stories/tales, including Brothers Grimm's fairy tales: Rapunzel and The Twelve Dancing Princesses, Tchaikovsky's Swan Lake ballet, Charles Dickens' A Christmas Carol, Hans Christian Andersen's Thumbelina and Alexandre Dumas' The Three Musketeers.

The second film in the series, Barbie as Rapunzel, saw the debut of the film series on American television via Nickelodeon as television specials. For home video formats, the release of the series on VHS ceased in 2006 after Barbie Fairytopia: Mermaidia following a general gradual decline in the use of the format and the transfer of distribution duties for the series to Universal (taking over from Lionsgate (now Starz Entertainment), which had absorbed FHE and Artisan Entertainment in 2003, in part because of a breakdown in negotiations over rights fees) in favor of DVD releases only. The Blu-ray and digital copies (branded as "Digital HD") were introduced to accompany the DVD with the release of Barbie in the Pink Shoes in 2013.

Due to the popularity of the 2004 film Barbie as the Princess and the Pauper (based on Mark Twain's famous novel), a remake was released in 2012 entitled Barbie: The Princess & the Popstar, which itself inspired two films with a more modern look: Barbie in Rock 'N Royals in 2015 and Barbie: Princess Adventure in 2020.

The success of the first three films (Barbie in the Nutcracker, Barbie as Rapunzel and Barbie of Swan Lake) led to the princess-themed lineup in the series, releasing its debut entirely original princess film Barbie and the Magic of Pegasus in 2005. The first original film in the franchise, based on a pre-existing toy line, Barbie: Fairytopia, released earlier that year, spawned the first-in-series franchise made up of two sequels (Barbie Fairytopia: Mermaidia in 2006 and Barbie Fairytopia: Magic of the Rainbow in 2007) and two spin-offs (Barbie: Mariposa in 2008 and its sequel, Barbie: Mariposa & the Fairy Princess, in 2013).

Starting with Barbie in a Mermaid Tale in early 2010, the film series moved away from the classic princess and fairy stories to focus on more modern themes like fashion, music and on stories revolving around Barbie's friends, family and careers. Barbie: Video Game Hero, the 35th film entry released in early 2017, marked the last time a Barbie film both aired on American television and released on home video formats. In 2017, the film series was put on hiatus after Barbie: Dolphin Magic, which served as the pilot to the inaugural television show in the franchise, Barbie: Dreamhouse Adventures, in Mattel's attempt to focus on expanding the franchise to other audiovisual media formats. Mattel later revamped the films in 2020 as animated "specials", beginning with the musical, Barbie: Princess Adventure.

Below is the full official computer-animated films in the media franchise:

#	Film	U.S. original release date	Director(s)	Screenwriter(s)	Ref.
1	Barbie in the Nutcracker	October 2, 2001	Owen Hurley	Rob Hudnut, Linda Engelsiepen & Hilary Hinkle	
2	Barbie as Rapunzel	October 1, 2002	Owen Hurley	Elana Lesser & Cliff Ruby	
3	Barbie of Swan Lake	September 30, 2003	Owen Hurley	Elana Lesser & Cliff Ruby	
4	Barbie as the Princess and the Pauper	September 28, 2004	William Lau	Elana Lesser & Cliff Ruby	
5	Barbie: Fairytopia	March 8, 2005	Walter P. Martishius	Elise Allen & Diane Duane	
6	Barbie and the Magic of Pegasus	September 20, 2005	Greg Richardson	Elana Lesser & Cliff Ruby	
7	Barbie Fairytopia: Mermaidia	March 14, 2006	William Lau & Walter P. Martishius	Elise Allen & Diane Duane	
8	The Barbie Diaries	May 9, 2006	Eric Fogel	Elise Allen & Laura McCreary	
9	Barbie in the 12 Dancing Princesses	September 19, 2006	Greg Richardson	Elana Lesser & Cliff Ruby	
10	Barbie Fairytopia: Magic of the Rainbow	March 13, 2007	William Lau	Elise Allen	
11	Barbie as the Island Princess	September 18, 2007	Greg Richardson	Elana Lesser & Cliff Ruby	
12	Barbie: Mariposa	February 26, 2008	Conrad Helten	Elise Allen	
13	Barbie & the Diamond Castle	September 9, 2008	Gino Nichelle	Elana Lesser & Cliff Ruby	
14	Barbie in a Christmas Carol	November 4, 2008	William Lau	Elise Allen	
15	Barbie Presents: Thumbelina	March 17, 2009	Conrad Helten	Elise Allen	
16	Barbie and the Three Musketeers	September 15, 2009	William Lau	Amy Wolfram	
17	Barbie in a Mermaid Tale	March 2, 2010	Adam L. Wood	Elise Allen	
18	Barbie: A Fashion Fairytale	September 14, 2010	William Lau	Elise Allen	
19	Barbie: A Fairy Secret	March 15, 2011	William Lau	Elise Allen	
20	Barbie: Princess Charm School	September 13, 2011	Ezekiel Norton	Elise Allen	
21	Barbie: A Perfect Christmas	November 8, 2011	Mark Baldo	Elise Allen	
22	Barbie in A Mermaid Tale 2	February 27, 2012	William Lau	Elise Allen	
23	Barbie: The Princess & the Popstar	September 11, 2012	Ezekiel Norton	Steve Granat & Cydne Clark	
24	Barbie in the Pink Shoes	February 26, 2013	Owen Hurley	Alison Taylor	
25	Barbie: Mariposa & the Fairy Princess	August 27, 2013	William Lau	Elise Allen	
26	Barbie & Her Sisters in A Pony Tale	October 22, 2013	Kyran Kelly	Cydne Clark & Steve Granat	
27	Barbie: The Pearl Princess	February 15, 2014	Ezekiel Norton	Cydne Clark & Steve Granat	
28	Barbie and the Secret Door	August 7, 2014	Karen J. Lloyd	Brian Hohlfeld	
29	Barbie in Princess Power	February 26, 2015	Ezekiel Norton	Marsha Griffin	
30	Barbie in Rock 'N Royals	August 13, 2015	Karen J. Lloyd	Marsha Griffin	
31	Barbie & Her Sisters in the Great Puppy Adventure	October 8, 2015	Andrew Tan	Amy Wolfram	
32	Barbie: Spy Squad	January 15, 2016	Conrad Helten	Marsha Griffin & Kacey Arnold	
33	Barbie: Star Light Adventure	August 29, 2016	Andrew Tan	Kacey Arnold	
34	Barbie & Her Sisters in A Puppy Chase	October 18, 2016	Conrad Helten	Amy Wolfram & Kacey Arnold	
35	Barbie: Video Game Hero	January 31, 2017	Conrad Helten & Ezekiel Norton	Nina Bargiel	
36	Barbie: Dolphin Magic	September 18, 2017	Conrad Helten	Jennifer Skelly	
37	Barbie: Princess Adventure	September 1, 2020	Conrad Helten	Ann Austen	
38	Barbie & Chelsea: The Lost Birthday	April 16, 2021	Cassandra Mackay (credited as Cassi Simonds)	Ann Austen & Nathaniel "Nate" Federman	
39	Barbie: Big City, Big Dreams	September 1, 2021	Scott Pleydell-Pearce	Christopher Keenan & Catherine "Kate" Splaine	
40	Barbie: Mermaid Power	September 1, 2022	Ron Myrick	Ann Austen	
41	Barbie: Epic Road Trip	October 25, 2022	Conrad Helten	Aury Wallington	
42	Barbie: Skipper and the Big Babysitting Adventure	March 16, 2023	Steve Daye	Daniel Bryan Franklin	
43	Barbie and Stacie to the Rescue	March 14, 2024	Kay Christianson-Donmyer & Margaret Dunlap	Conrad Helten	
44	Barbie & Teresa: Recipe for Friendship	March 6, 2025	Karen J. Loyd	Margaret Dunlap	

== Live-action film ==
A live-action adaptation of the toy line from Mattel Films in collaboration with LuckyChap Entertainment and Heyday Films was released on July 21, 2023 by Warner Bros. having wrapped on July 15, 2022. The film was directed by Greta Gerwig, who co-wrote the screenplay with Noah Baumbach, and stars an ensemble cast led by Margot Robbie as Barbie and Ryan Gosling as Ken.

== Animated specials ==
Before the films and the video games, Mattel released two animated television specials in 1987. Another animated special was released on February 1, 2023, on YouTube to complement a doll line exclusively aimed at preschoolers.

- Barbie and the Rockers: Out of This World, a 1987 animated TV special created by DIC Animation City with Saban Productions and featuring Barbie as the leader of a rock band. It is supposedly the pilot to a daily Barbie animated series that was scrapped in 1988.
- Barbie and the Sensations: Rockin' Back to Earth, a 1987 sequel to Barbie and the Rockers: Out of This World, where Barbie and her band return from space only to end up in the 1950s.
- My First Barbie: Happy Dreamday, a 40-minute musical animated special produced by Canada-based Kickstart Entertainment and released on February 1, 2023, on YouTube, featuring Barbie and her friends as they prepare for a surprise party for Chelsea.

== Animated series ==
Mattel has released several animated television shows, web series and miniseries since 2012 which include as follows:

=== Television series ===
Series	Seasons	Episodes	Originally released	Original platform
Barbie Dreamhouse Adventures	5	52	2018 – 2020	Netflix
Barbie: It Takes Two	2	26	2022	Netflix
Barbie: A Touch of Magic	2	26	2023 – 2024	Netflix
Barbie Mysteries	2	16	2024 – 2025	Netflix

Barbie Dreamhouse Adventures: the inaugural TV series in the franchise released between May 3, 2018, and April 12, 2020, on Netflix in the U.S. It consisted of 52 episodes over 5 "season" episode bundles and aired as an actual TV series in over 8 countries.

Barbie: It Takes Two: the second TV series in the franchise released in two installments on Netflix in the United States; 13 episodes on April 8 and another 13 on October 1, both in 2022. Released as the television format follow-up to the film released before it, Barbie: Big City, Big Dreams: the series debuted on Australian television via 9Go! and later aired on television in over 4 countries/regions/territories.

Barbie: A Touch of Magic: the third TV series in the franchise released on Netflix in the United States and globally on September 14, 2023. It aired on television in over 6 countries, with Super RTL in Germany and 9Go! in Australia having its release in multichannel television and in video on demand.

Barbie Mysteries: the fourth TV series in the franchise and the second project animated by Canada-based Kickstarter Entertainment for Mattel after the "My First Barbie" special. It was released on Netflix in the US and globally in two-themed parts: Barbie Mysteries: The Great Horse Chase on November 1, 2024, and Barbie Mysteries: Beach Detectives on August 28, 2025. The Great Horse Chase follows Barbie "Malibu" Roberts and Barbie "Brooklyn" Roberts as private investigators in the field of equestrianism and investigating missing horses in England, United Kingdom. Beach Detectives sees a return of the Barbie-named girls to Malibu, along with Ken and Barbie's friends, for the Malibu Beach Bash, where mysterious thefts arise and arrive out of the blue and require some thoughtful insights, interviews and sights and sounds to resolve.

=== Web series ===
Series	Seasons	Episodes	Originally released	Original platform	Ref
Barbie: Life in the Dreamhouse	7	75	2012 – 2015	YouTube	
Barbie Vlogs	8	193	2015 – 2022	YouTube	
Barbie: Motion Comics	3	22	2015	YouTube	
Barbie Dreamtopia (shorts)	1	8	2016	YouTube	
Barbie Dreamtopia (series)	1	26	2017 – 2018	YouTube	
Barbie 3D Dreamworld	7	60	2021 – 2022	YouTube	
Barbie: Life in the City	1	11	2022	YouTube	
Barbie Doll Adventures	3	35	2024 – current	YouTube	
Barbie Dream Besties	2	11	2024 – current	YouTube	

Barbie: Life in the Dreamhouse (2012–2015) was the first Barbie animated series, airing exclusively on YouTube with 75 episodes. There were two TV specials which aired in the United States on Nickelodeon.

Following the success of Barbie: Life in the Dreamhouse, Mattel developed Barbie Vlogs (2015–2022), a YouTube-exclusive CGI-animated series featuring Barbie as a vlogger either by herself or along with one or more of her family and friends.

In 2015, the Barbie YouTube channel also released Barbie: Motion Comics. A web-based animated motion comic series composed of three miniseries: Be Super (inspired by Barbie in Princess Power), Raise Your Voice (inspired by Barbie in Rock 'N Royals), and Puppy Adventures (inspired by Barbie & Her Sisters in The Great Puppy Adventure).

Barbie Dreamtopia is a web-exclusive franchise that began in January 2016 with the release of 2-minute to 4-minute shorts on YouTube. Mattel then released a 44-minute television special (airing on television in 5 countries), one web special, and an initially-exclusive YouTube Kids series with 26 episodes. The latter was published on YouTube from November 5, 2017, to April 1, 2018, and aired as a traditional television series in over 6 countries.

Barbie 3D Dreamworld is a YouTube-exclusive web series franchise created by Ireland-based Relish Studios. The first episode was released on January 25, 2021. The series takes place within the doll world. Each season varies from 4-8 episodes in total, with each individual episode lasting around 3–4 minutes on average. It is composed of several different miniseries, which include: Barbie: Fashion Fun, Barbie and the Nutcracker, Barbie: Dream Magic, Barbie: Camp Sister Switch, and Barbie: Return to Dreamtopia, among others.

Barbie: Life in the City is a YouTube-exclusive web series that debuted on September 15, 2022, focusing on Barbie "Brooklyn" Roberts and expanding her character to emphasize her role and prominence within the brand.

== Short films ==
Mattel produced a number of animated short films featuring Barbie as tie-ins with other titles within the franchise which include as follows:

- Barbie as Sleeping Beauty, a 1999 short film based on the fairy tale released as a TV commercial to supplement a doll line and a video game of the same name. A full-length version supposedly adapting Tchaikovsky's ballet was scrapped in 2009.
- Barbie: A Camping We Will Go, a 2011 CGI-animated short film produced by Technicolor that revolved around Barbie and her sisters to accompany the film, Barbie: A Perfect Christmas.
- Barbie in the Pink Shoes: Land of Sweets, a 2013 short film and Christmas special for Barbie in the Pink Shoes that was first released in German, then was later dubbed in English.
- Barbie and the Nutcracker, a 2021 short film released on YouTube as an episode for Barbie's Dreamworld and, along with a doll line, was part of celebrating the 20th anniversary of the first film, Barbie in the Nutcracker.

== Related animations ==
Aside its eponymous franchise, Mattel also licensed for Barbie to appear in other related animated productions which include as follows:

- Dance! Workout with Barbie, a 1992 30-minute direct-to-video workout tape, featuring Barbie in stop-motion animation by Will Vinton Productions and teaching dance aerobics to real girls.
- Toy Story, a Disney-Pixar film franchise that started in 1995 and featuring Barbie (and later Ken) as supporting characters from Toy Story 2 onwards and its 2011 short film Hawaiian Vacation.
- My Scene, a discontinued franchise launched by Mattel in 2002 and featuring Barbie in its web series and in all of its films, namely: Jammin' in Jamaica and Masquerade Madness in 2004 and My Scene Goes Hollywood in 2005.
- Kelly Dream Club, a 2002 direct-to-video animated series by Creative Capers Entertainment and featuring Barbie as a supporting character to her younger sister, Kelly (renamed Chelsea in 2011).

== Cancelled projects ==
In an earlier version of the first Toy Story film, Barbie was supposed to have a pivotal role. However, Mattel did not authorize her use to Pixar, as they feared the film would not be successful. Additionally, they wanted to maintain Barbie's neutrality wherein every girl who bought a Barbie doll could imagine her as they wanted, rather than as she was portrayed in a particular film. After the success of the first film, multiple Barbie dolls had small roles in Toy Story 2, before the debut of the franchise's definitive iteration in the second sequel.

The 1999 short film commercial, Barbie as Sleeping Beauty, which was released on Nickelodeon as a tie-in to a doll line and video game of the same name, was originally pitched to be a full-length film. At the peak of classic princess-themed films in the 2000s, Mattel continued to pitch the idea of adapting the fairy tale based on the ballet, completing the adaptations of all three Tchaikovsky's ballets into the franchise. However, it was scrapped without any disclosure on the status of its development while doll lines were released on multiple occasions. Although the reason behind the cancellation is closely linked to The Walt Disney Company being granted to trademark the name "Princess Aurora" and included the acquisition of some of the music (also based on the ballet) for its film.

== Future ==
Starting with the interactive special film Barbie: Epic Road Trip on October 25, 2022, Mattel signed a long-term deal or contract extension with Netflix to make available the pre-2017 film catalogue previously held by Universal Pictures occasionally on the service and also co-produce upcoming projects which include exclusive animated films, specials and shows based on Barbie, while still maintaining the possibility of linear television broadcast agreements and YouTube engagements. On July 16, 2025, an animated feature film was announced to be in development at Illumination.

=== Upcoming projects ===
Title	Release date	Distributor	Notes	References
Barbie in a Mermaid Tale Adventure	2027	YouTube Kids	The special will serve as a reimagining of the 2010 film Barbie in a Mermaid Tale.	

== Timeline of media appearances ==
Barbie began her mainstream non-advertised media appearances character in the 1987 TV specials where she was voiced by Sharon Lewis. She was voiced by Jodi Benson during her appearances in the Toy Story film franchise. In the Barbie lead-role films, she was voiced by Kelly Sheridan in 27 films altogether. Sheridan was initially succeeded by Diana Kaarina beginning with Barbie: A Fashion Fairytale in 2010, but returned to the role 2 years later with Barbie in a Mermaid Tale 2 and stayed put until Mattel announced Erica Lindbeck as her successor from 2016. The film series was put on a hiatus in 2017 for the shift in focus to the TV series, Barbie: Dreamhouse Adventures, where America Young would replace Lindbeck as the vocal provider for Barbie ahead of the film series resumption in 2020. She was portrayed by Australian actress Margot Robbie in the live-action adaptation of the toyline which was released on July 21, 2023.

== Reception ==
=== DVD Commercial performance ===
The first 10 films in the franchise sold 40 million DVD and VHS units worldwide by 2007, grossing over $700 million in sales. As of 2013, the films in the franchise has sold over 110 million DVD units worldwide.

#	Film	U.S. original release date	Video sales	Sales revenue
1	Barbie in the Nutcracker	October 2, 2001	110,000,000	$700,000,000
2	Barbie as Rapunzel	October 1, 2002	110,000,000	$700,000,000
3	Barbie of Swan Lake	September 30, 2003	110,000,000	$700,000,000
4	Barbie as the Princess and the Pauper	September 28, 2004	110,000,000	$700,000,000
5	Barbie: Fairytopia	March 8, 2005	110,000,000	$700,000,000
6	Barbie and the Magic of Pegasus	September 20, 2005	110,000,000	$700,000,000
7	Barbie Fairytopia: Mermaidia	March 14, 2006	110,000,000	$700,000,000
8	The Barbie Diaries	May 9, 2006	110,000,000	$700,000,000
9	Barbie in the 12 Dancing Princesses	September 19, 2006	110,000,000	$700,000,000
10	Barbie Fairytopia: Magic of the Rainbow	March 13, 2007	110,000,000	$700,000,000
11	Barbie as the Island Princess	September 18, 2007	110,000,000	$28,205,093
12	Barbie: Mariposa	February 26, 2008	110,000,000	$14,082,768
13	Barbie & the Diamond Castle	September 9, 2008	110,000,000	$11,643,793
14	Barbie in A Christmas Carol	November 4, 2008	110,000,000	$6,626,008
15	Barbie Presents: Thumbelina	March 17, 2009	110,000,000	$11,088,380
16	Barbie and the Three Musketeers	September 15, 2009	110,000,000	$19,813,585
17	Barbie in A Mermaid Tale	March 2, 2010	110,000,000	$18,295,349
18	Barbie: A Fashion Fairytale	September 14, 2010	110,000,000	$19,473,444
19	Barbie: A Fairy Secret	March 15, 2011	110,000,000	$14,483,518
20	Barbie: Princess Charm School	September 13, 2011	110,000,000	$10,254,239
21	Barbie: A Perfect Christmas	November 8, 2011	110,000,000	$13,019,893
22	Barbie in A Mermaid Tale 2	February 27, 2012	110,000,000	$14,840,303
23	Barbie: The Princess & the Popstar	September 11, 2012	110,000,000	$18,959,311
24	Barbie in the Pink Shoes	February 26, 2013	581,187	$10,843,872
25	Barbie: Mariposa & the Fairy Princess	August 27, 2013	271,194	$5,878,488
26	Barbie & Her Sisters in A Pony Tale	October 22, 2013	458,026	$9,454,173
27	Barbie: The Pearl Princess	February 15, 2014	368,500	$7,580,205
28	Barbie and the Secret Door	August 7, 2014	329,836	$8,488,067
29	Barbie in Princess Power	February 26, 2015	212,385	$4,655,070
30	Barbie in Rock 'N Royals	August 13, 2015	131,836	$5,006,613
31	Barbie & Her Sisters in The Great Puppy Adventure	October 8, 2015	69,950	$4,171,779
32	Barbie: Spy Squad	January 15, 2016	190,146	$2,961,549
33	Barbie: Star Light Adventure	August 29, 2016	21,154	$2,088,235
34	Barbie & Her Sisters in A Puppy Chase	October 18, 2016	22,492	$2,095,317
	Total		112,656,706	$964,009,052
Note: This list will be updated once the information is disclosed.

=== Accolades ===
Barbie franchise has received multiple performing arts awards. Barbie in the 12 Dancing Princesses and Barbie Fairytopia: Magic of the Rainbow earned nominations for Daytime Emmy Awards. Barbie the Album received twelve Grammy Award nominations and won three awards, including Song of the Year, Best Song Written for Visual Media (for "What Was I Made For") and Best Compilation Soundtrack for Visual Media. The film also received eight Academy Award nominations, including Best Picture, Best Adapted Screenplay, Best Supporting Actor (Gosling), Best Supporting Actress (Ferrera) and two nominations for Best Original Song (for "I'm Just Ken" and "What Was I Made For"). It eventually won Best Original Song (for "What Was I Made For").

== In other media ==
=== Video games ===
Mattel has produced dozens of Barbie video games since the 1980s. These games are often tie-ins with other titles within the franchise. Since 2018, video games based on Barbie media are produced by Budge Studios.

=== Books ===
Mattel has produced more than 400 books published by multiple authors and publishers based on Barbie since the early 1990s. Every film in the franchise has an eponymous book adaptation.

=== Comic books ===
Mattel has produced a series of comic books about Barbie published by Dell Comics between 1962 and 1963 and Marvel Comics between 1991 and 1996. Since 2016, Papercutz is currently the publisher of graphic novels based on Barbie which are usually tie-ins with other titles within the franchise.

- Barbie and Ken, a 5-issue comic series published by Dell Comics from May 1962 to November 1963.
- Barbie, a 63-issue comic series published by Marvel Comics from January 1991 to March 1996.
- Barbie: Fashion, a 53-issue comic series published by Marvel Comics from January 1991 to May 1995.
- Barbie: Halloween Special, a 2-issue comic series published by Marvel Comics in October 1993.
- Barbie and Baby Sister Kelly, a special one-shot published by Marvel Comics in October 1995.

=== Albums ===
Mattel has released dozens of soundtrack albums and compilation albums based on Barbie since the early 1960s. Most of the films, especially those under the musical genre, are accompanied by their eponymous soundtracks.

- Barbie Sings!, a 7" vinyl box set released in 1961 with the voices of Charlotte Austin and Bill Cunningham as "Barbie" and "Ken", respectively.
- Barbie Sings! The Princess Movie Collection, a soundtrack album released on October 5, 2004, that features music from the first four film entries in the series: Barbie in the Nutcracker, Barbie as Rapunzel, Barbie of Swan Lake and Barbie as the Princess and the Pauper.
- Sing Along with Barbie, a direct-to-video released on November 9, 2009, and a compilation of twelve songs from different Barbie films released at that time that its viewers can sing-along to.

== In popular media ==
On February 14, 2021, film and media podcast, Cult Popture, released an 18-hour episode of Film Franchise Fortnights covering all of the 37 Barbie films released at the time. During the production of the episode, a 38th film was announced.

== See also ==
- Barbenheimer
