= List of Mattel productions =

American toy manufacturing and entertainment company Mattel first ventured into full-time entertainment beyond product placements and advertisements in May 1970.

Beginning in 2001, Mattel began using a pseudonym banner, Mattel Entertainment, for its productions until the establishment of an actual studio, Mattel Playground Productions, on 26 October 2013.

== Miscellaneous ==
Productions in this section were released under two or more banners during its run. This section also includes productions made before 2001.

Title	Original run	Format	Network	Co-production with	Notes
Barbie films	2001–2014	Film series	Direct-to-video; Nickelodeon (U.S.)	Mainframe Entertainment/Rainmaker Animation/Rainmaker Entertainment (24 entries); Technicolor (2 entries); Arc Productions (1 entry)	Films released between 1 September 2010 and 31 March 2014 were under the sales mark name of "Barbie Entertainment".
Monster High	20 October 2013 – 3 April 2016	2D-animated shorts and web series	Nerd Corps Entertainment	YouTube	
Monster High films	2010–2016	CGI-animated films	DHX Media Vancouver; Nerd Corps Entertainment	Television: Cartoon Network (Latin America); Nickelodeon (U.S.; international); Universal Pictures Home Entertainment (Home video release)	22–24 minutes (2010–2011); 61–75 minutes (2012–2016)
Polly Pocket web series	14 September 2011 (Note: Per this episode released on the "Mattel Imagine" YouTube channel and previously the dedicated "Polly Pocket" channel.) – 15 June 2017	CGI-animated web series	Liquid Studio	YouTube	Third revival of the Polly Pocket media franchise
Ever After High	30 May 2013 – 20 June 2016	"Legacy Day" 15-minute special	Guru Studio	Netflix	Web series
Ever After High	30 May 2013 – 20 June 2016	"True Hearts Day" 22-minute webisode special	Guru Studio	Nickelodeon (U.S.; international); YouTube; EverAfterHigh.com	Web series
Ever After High	30 May 2013 – 20 June 2016	"Thronecoming" 44-minute television special	Guru Studio	Nickelodeon (U.S.; international); YouTube; EverAfterHigh.com	Web series
Ever After High	30 May 2013 – 20 June 2016	66 3-minute webisodes	Guru Studio	Nickelodeon (U.S.; international); YouTube; EverAfterHigh.com	Web series

== Mattel Entertainment ==
Title	Original run	Format	Network	Co-production with	Notes
Little People	1999–2007	TV series	Direct-to-video	Egmont Imagination (volumes 1–13); Cuppa Coffee Studios (volumes 14–27)	
Hot Wheels: World Race	2003	Miniseries	Cartoon Network	Mainframe Entertainment	
Rescue Heroes: The Movie	2003	Film	Direct-to-video	Nelvana	
Fisher-Price Baby Development series	2003	Miniseries	Direct-to-video	Benjamin Productions	
Polly Pocket: Lunar Eclipse	2004	Short film	Direct-to-video	Mike Young Productions	
My Scene: Jammin' in Jamaica	2004	Film	Direct-to-video	Curious Pictures	
My Scene: Masquerade Madness	2004	Film	Direct-to-video	Curious Pictures	
Polly Pocket: 2 Cool at the Pocket Plaza	2005	Short film	Direct-to-video	Curious Pictures	
Hot Wheels: AcceleRacers	2005	Television special series	Cartoon Network; Direct-to-video	Mainframe Entertainment	
My Scene Goes Hollywood: The Movie	2005	Film	Direct-to-video	Curious Pictures; Miramax Family	
PollyWorld	2006	Film	Nickelodeon	Curious Pictures	
The Barbie Diaries	2006	Animated motion-capture film	Direct-to-video; Nickelodeon	Curious Pictures	This film only showed the Mattel logo after the closing credits, which only happened once in a Barbie film, until 2014. Also the first Barbie film not to be animated by Mainframe Studios.
GeoTrax	2007–2008	TV series	Direct-to-video		
Planet Heroes	2008	TV series	Direct-to-video		
Barbie: Life in the Dreamhouse	10 January 2012 – 27 November 2015	Web shorts	YouTube; Netflix	Arc Productions	

== Mattel Playground Productions ==
Title	Release date(s)	Type	Production partner(s)	Distributor	Notes
Max Steel	25 March 2013 – 29 July 2017	TV series	Disney XD; Netflix	Nerd Corps Entertainment; FremantleMedia Kids & Family	
Barbie and the Secret Door	16 October 2014	CGI-animated film	Rainmaker Entertainment	Television: Cartoon Network (Latin America); Nickelodeon (U.S.; international); Universal Pictures Home Entertainment (Home video release)	
Team Hot Wheels	7 June 2014	Animated series	Mercury Filmworks; Titmouse, Inc.	Digital platforms YouTube	22-minute origin story (Spring); 11 2-minute shorts (Summer); 74-minute direct-to-video film (Autumn/Fall)
WWE Slam City	17 March 2014	Stop motion series	Stoopid Buddy Stoodios	Digital platforms Nicktoons	26-episode 2-minute shorts series
Barbie in Princess Power	3 March 2015	CGI-animated film	Rainmaker Entertainment	Nickelodeon (U.S. broadcast); Universal Pictures Home Entertainment (Home video release)	
Barbie in Rock 'N Royals	13 August 2015	CGI-animated film	Rainmaker Entertainment	Nickelodeon (U.S. broadcast); Universal Pictures Home Entertainment (Home video release)	
Barbie & Her Sisters in The Great Puppy Adventure	8 October 2015	CGI-animated film	Rainmaker Entertainment	Nickelodeon (U.S. broadcast); Universal Pictures Home Entertainment (Home video release)	
Barbie: Spy Squad	15 January 2016 (Poland); 2 February 2016	CGI-animated film	Rainmaker Entertainment	Nickelodeon (U.S. broadcast); Universal Pictures Home Entertainment (Home video release)	
Max Steel	26 October 2016	Live-action film	Dolphin Films; Ingenious Media	Open Road Films	Final production before the absorption of Mattel PGP into Mattel Creations.

== Mattel Creations ==
Title	Release date(s)	Type	Co-producer	Distributor(s)	Notes
Thomas & Friends: The Great Race	21 May 2016 (UK; theatrical); September 2016 (DVD); Early 2017 (TV)	Animated film	Arc Productions	National Amusements (UK; theatrical); Multiple (TV)	
Barbie: Star Light Adventure	30 July 2016 (Fathom Events); 29 August 2016 (Home video release)	Animated film	Arc Productions	Fathom Events (U.S.; limited theatrical release); Universal Pictures Home Entertainment (Home video release)	Final production of Arc Productions before payroll glitch-turned-bankruptcy and re-opening as Jam Filled Entertainment's Toronto division/branch
Barbie Dreamtopia	10 January 2016 – 1 April 2018 (original); 21 July – 21 October 2021 (as a Barbie Return to Dreamtopia segment of Barbie's Dreamworld)	Animated web serials	Snowball Studios (original); Relish Studios (Barbie Return to Dreamtopia)	YouTube Kids (YouTube); Cartoon Network (Latin America); Super RTL (Germany); Pop (UK & Ireland); MiniMini+ (Poland); TET (Ukraine); Carousel (Russia)	Began with a teaser promo video released on YouTube on 14 January, followed by 4 3-minute shorts also released on YouTube between 5 May to 21 July and then a 46-minute television special released by Universal on 16 June, all in 2016, which was broadcast on television in 5 countries and regions. The positive reception obtained resulted in the green-lighting of a web special released on 4 May 2017 called "Festival of Fun" and a 26-episode web series, which was released from 5 November 2017 to 1 April 2018, both on YouTube and YouTube Kids. The former would be re-released in 3 pieces as part the first batch of the latter. Ireland-based Relish Studios produced a web mini-serial spin-off of the franchise titled Barbie Return to Dreamtopia as part of a broader animated web series franchise known as Barbie's Dreamworld which was released between 21 July and 21 October 2021.
Monster High: Great Scarrier Reef	23 March 2016	CGI-animated film	DHX Media Vancouver	Cartoon Network (Latin America); Nickelodeon (United States; worldwide); Universal Pictures Home Entertainment (home video formats)	61 minutes
WellieWishers	8 September 2016	Animated series	Submarine Studios	Amazon Prime Video (U.S.); Tiny Pop (UK)	2 seasons, 26 episodes; American Girl doll franchise
Barbie & Her Sisters in A Puppy Chase	18 October 2016	CGI-animated film	Rainmaker Entertainment	Nickelodeon (U.S. broadcast); Universal Pictures Home Entertainment (Home video release; international)	Pre-production done by Arc Productions prior to its closure. The film was brought over to Rainmaker Entertainment for completion.
Barbie: Video Game Hero	January 31, 2017	CGI-animated film	Rainmaker Entertainment	Nickelodeon (U.S. broadcast); Universal Pictures Home Entertainment (Home video release; international)	Last Barbie film to be shown on either Nickelodeon or other/another children's television network(s) in the United States
Monster High: Electrified	12 February 2017	CGI-animated film	Flaunt Studios	Cartoon Network (Latin America); Nickelodeon (United States; worldwide); Universal Pictures Home Entertainment (Home video formats)	64 minutes
The Toy Box	7 April 2017 – 19 November 2017	Reality series	Hudsun Media; Electus	ABC (U.S. broadcast); Electus International	2 seasons
Monster High: Adventures of the Ghoul Squad	August 11, 2017 – February 9, 2018	Animated web series		YouTube	12 11-minute episodes
Barbie Dolphin Magic	17 September 2017 (Canada); 17 September 2018	CGI-animated film	Rainmaker Entertainment	Television: YTV (Canada); Pop (UK and Ireland); Streaming: Netflix (U.S., International)	Only Netflix-exclusive Barbie film to be released on home video (DVD and Digital HD) and video on demand by Universal.
Pingu in the City	7 October 2017 – 30 March 2019	Sony Creative Products; Polygon Pictures	NHK Educational TV	2 seasons	
Minecraft Mini Series	26 October 2017 – 10 May 2018	Mojang Studios; Microsoft Studios; Atomic Cartoons	YouTube	2 seasons	
Fireman Sam	18 November 2017 – present	Island of Misfits (series 11–12); WildBrain Studios (series 12–present)	Cartoonito UK & Ireland; Channel 5	3 seasons, 10 previous seasons; Distributed by WildBrain	
Barbie Dreamhouse Adventures (Note: Used Mattel Creations for seasons 1 and 2 and Mattel Television thereafter.)	3 May 2018 – 12 April 2020	CGI-animated television series	Mainframe Studios	Netflix (U.S., International); Television: YTV (Canada); 9Go! (Australia); Canal Panda (Portugal)	5 seasons, 52 episodes
Polly Pocket	8 July 2018 – 23 November 2023	2D-animated series	WildBrain Studios	Family Channel (season 1); Universal Kids (seasons 1 and 2); Netflix (seasons 2 – 5)	

== Mattel Films ==
Title	Release date(s)	Type	Production partner(s)	Distributor	Notes
Barbie	21 July 2023	Live-action film	Heyday Films; LuckyChap Entertainment; NB/GG Pictures	Warner Bros. Pictures	First movie from the division to receive a PG-13 rating. Only production with the Mattel Films name before the division was merged with Mattel Television to form Mattel Studios.

== Mattel Television/Mattel Television Studios ==
Title	Release date(s)	Type	Co-producer	Distributor(s)	Notes
Barbie: Princess Adventure	1 September 2020	CGI-animated streaming television film	Mainframe Studios	Netflix	
Barbie & Chelsea: The Lost Birthday	16 April 2021	CGI-animated streaming television film	Mainframe Studios	Netflix	Inaugural film to star Chelsea Roberts in a lead role since Barbie: Dreamtopia
Masters of the Universe: Revelation	23 July – 23 November 2021	Animated streaming television series	Powerhouse Animation Studios	Netflix	2-part animated series
Barbie: Big City, Big Dreams	20 August 2021 (UK); 1 September 2021 (U.S., International)	Animated streaming television film	Mainframe Studios	Netflix	Inaugural Barbie-branded production starring Barbie Roberts from Malibu and a darker-skin tone Barbie Roberts from Brooklyn, New York City in Mattel's statement push to showcase absolute diversity within future productions in its media franchise. It was given a limited theatrical release in the British Isles on 20 August 2021 before the American Netflix debut.
Thomas & Friends: All Engines Go	13 September 2021 – 11 September 2025	Animated television series	Nelvana	Cartoon Network (U.S.); Treehouse TV (Canada)	Reboot of Thomas & Friends
He-Man and the Masters of the Universe	16 September 2021 – 18 August 2022	Computer-animated streaming television series	House of Cool; CGCG, Inc.	Netflix	Re-imagining of the eponymous original 1983 TV series produced by Filmation.
Barbie: It Takes Two	4 March 2022 (Television debut; Australia via 9Go!); 8 April – 1 October 2022 (American Netflix debut)	Computer-animated streaming television series	Mainframe Studios	Television: 9Go! (Australia); Pop (UK and Ireland); YTV (Canada); Canal Panda (Portugal); Streaming: Netflix (U.S., International)	Unveiled on 1 February 2022, via the Mattel website. Television adaptation of Barbie: Big City, Big Dreams. First aired on television in Australia on 4 March and in the United Kingdom and Ireland on 2 April before launching on Netflix in the U.S. on 8 April. Also aired on television in Canada on 10 April and in Portugal on 17 April. The first half of episodes was released on 8 April and the other half on 1 October.
Deepa & Anoop	15 August – 7 November 2022	Animated musical streaming television series	Kickstart Entertainment	Netflix	The inaugural television show based on original homegrown intellectual property. Created by Bollywood animator Munjal Shroff, written by Lisa Goldman and produced by Heather Kenyon, the show follows the adventures of a 7-year-old girl named Deepa, voiced by Pavan Bharaj, and her friend, a color-changing baby elephant named Anoop. 2 seasons.
Barbie: Mermaid Power	1 September 2022	CGI-animated streaming television film	Mainframe Studios	Netflix (U.S., International); 9Go! (Australia); YTV (Canada)	This film was also shown in theatres/cinemas across Europe and the Middle East between September and October 2022. Second television film and third production overall to feature two girls named "Barbie Roberts". Perceived among fans as the sequel to Barbie Dolphin Magic.
Pictionary	12 September 2022 – 30 May 2025	Game show	Fox First Run; Bill's Market and Television Production; CBS Media Ventures	Syndication	
Monster High: The Movie	6 October 2022	Live-action musical film	Brightlight Pictures; Nickelodeon Productions	Nickelodeon (U.S., television); Paramount+ (streaming)	Both were announced on 23 February 2021.
Monster High	6 October 2022 – 24 October 2024	CGI-animated television series	Nickelodeon Animation Studio	Nickelodeon	Both were announced on 23 February 2021.
Barbie: Epic Road Trip	25 October 2022	CGI-animated streaming interactive special	Mainframe Studios	Netflix (U.S., International)	The 4th production to feature two girls named "Barbie Roberts". The inaugural interactive special of the Barbie media franchise.
Barbie: Skipper and the Big Babysitting Adventure	16 March 2023	CGI-animated streaming television film	Mainframe Studios	Netflix (U.S., International) (Note: Its Netflix page was initially unveiled on 3 March before going offline a week later in anticipation of its actual release date.); 9Go! (Australia); YTV (Canada)	Inaugural film to star Skipper Roberts in a lead role with more screen time than previous Barbie-branded productions.
Hot Wheels: Ultimate Challenge	30 May – 8 August 2023	Reality series	Endemol Shine North America; Workerbee TV	NBC	
Barbie Dreamhouse Challenge	17 July 2023 – September 2023	Reality series	Mission Control Media	HGTV	
Polly Pocket: Sparkle Cove Adventure	21 August 2023	Animated streaming television film	WildBrain Studios	Netflix	Mattel Television and WildBrain created this special as a way to close out Summer 2023. The special follows Polly Pocket as she explores an unknown world filled with magic. It is a 66-minute long film.
Barbie: A Touch of Magic	14 September 2023 – 18 April 2024	CGI-animated streaming television series	Mainframe Studios	Streaming: Netflix (US, international); Television: 9Now (Australia); Pop (UK & Ireland)	
Monster High 2	5 October 2023	Live-action musical film	Brightlight Pictures; Nickelodeon Productions	Nickelodeon (U.S., television); Paramount+ (streaming)	Announced on 25 October 2022 alongside the debut of Barbie: Epic Road Trip. Production began on 7 February 2023 with moments and scenes shared on social media.
Masters of the Universe: Revolution	25 January 2024	Animated streaming television series	Powerhouse Animation Studios	Netflix	Sequel to Masters of the Universe: Revelation.
Hot Wheels Let's Race	4 March 2024 – 3 March 2025	Animated streaming television series	Sprite Animation Studios; OLM, Digital	Netflix	
Scrabble	3 October 2024 – present	Game show	Hasbro Entertainment; Lionsgate Alternative Television	The CW	First television series co-produced by Hasbro and Mattel.
Barney's World	14 October 2024 – 8 November 2025	Animated television series	Nelvana	Treehouse TV (Canada, television); StackTV (streaming); Cartoonito (U.S., television); Max (streaming)(season 1); Netflix (season 2 – present)	

== Mattel Studios ==
Since 2 June 2025, productions still in development from Mattel's previous banners are shifted to this banner.

Title	Release date(s)	Type	Co-producer	Distributor(s)	Notes
Masters of the Universe	5 June 2026	Live-action film	Metro-Goldwyn-Mayer; Escape Artists	Amazon MGM Studios	
Matchbox: The Movie	9 October 2026	Live-action film	Skydance Media	Apple Studios	
Thomas & Friends	TBA	Live-action film	Metro-Goldwyn-Mayer; Escape Artists; 2DUX^{2}	Amazon MGM Studios	Previously in development at Mattel Films
Barney	TBA	Live-action film	Valparaiso Pictures; 59% Productions	A24	To be written by Ayo Edebiri, previously in development at Mattel Films
American Girl	TBA	Live-action film	Temple Hill Entertainment	Paramount Pictures	
Bob the Builder	TBA	Animated film	ShadowMachine; Nuyorican Productions	Amazon MGM Studios	Set to star Anthony Ramos
Barbie	TBA	Animated film	Illumination	Universal Pictures	
1990s Shani Doll movie	TBA	Live-action television series	Metro-Goldwyn-Mayer Television	Amazon MGM Studios	Debut television show under the current Mattel Studios banner, based on a Shani doll introduced in the 1990s
Christmas Balloon	TBA	Live-action film	Vital Pictures	TBA	Previously in development at Mattel Films
Hot Wheels	TBA	Live-action film	Bad Robot	Warner Bros. Pictures	Set to be directed by Jon M. Chu
Magic 8 Ball	TBA	Live-action film	TBA	TBA	Previously in development at Mattel Films, and later Blumhouse.
Major Matt Mason	TBA	Live-action film	Playtone; Weed Road Pictures	Paramount Pictures	Set to star Tom Hanks
Monster High	TBA	Live-action film	Weed Road Pictures	Universal Pictures	Hannah Hafey and Kaitlin Smith announced to screenwrite, previously in development at Mattel Films
Polly Pocket	TBA	Live-action film	Metro-Goldwyn-Mayer; Good Thing Going; Hello Sunshine	Amazon MGM Studios	
Rock 'Em Sock 'Em Robots	TBA	Live-action film	One Race Films	Universal Pictures	Set to star Vin Diesel
Tony the Tattooed Man	TBA	Live-action film	TBA	TBA	To be written and directed by Tracie Laymon
Uno	TBA	Live-action film	Quality Films	TBA	
View-Master	TBA	Live-action film	Columbia Pictures; Escape Artists	Sony Pictures Releasing	
Wishbone	TBA	Live-action film	TBA	Universal Pictures	
