= Barbie and the Magic of Pegasus =

- DVD cover art
- Directed by: Greg Richardson
- Written by: Elana Lesser; Cliff Ruby
- Produced by: Luke Carroll; Jesyca C. Durchin
- Starring: Kelly Sheridan; Lalainia Lindbjerg; Mark Hildreth
- Edited by: Logan McPherson
- Music by: Arnie Roth
- Production companies: Mainframe Entertainment; Mattel Entertainment
- Distributed by: North America; Lions Gate Home Entertainment; Overseas; Universal Pictures Video; UK and Ireland; Right Entertainment
- Release dates: September 18, 2005 (Nickelodeon); September 20, 2005 (VHS/DVD)
- Running time: 85 minutes
- Countries: Canada; United States
- Language: English

Barbie and the Magic of Pegasus is a 2005 animated fantasy adventure film directed by Greg Richardson (in his feature directorial debut) and produced by Mattel Entertainment with Mainframe Entertainment. It first premiered on Nickelodeon on September 18, 2005, and it was released later to VHS/DVD on September 20, 2005.

The sixth entry in the Barbie film series, it is the second to feature an original story and the first not to be based on previous material, as well as the only film to be released in 3D. It follows the story of Princess Annika, who has to save her parents after an evil wizard named Wenlock turns them to stone. Kelly Sheridan reprised her role for Barbie's character and Brie Larson recorded a song titled "Hope Has Wings" for the film.

== Official description ==
"Barbie takes flight in her first original princess fairy tale movie, Barbie and the Magic of Pegasus. Princess Annika discovers adventure when she is befriended by Brietta – a magnificent, winged horse – that flies her to the beautiful Cloud Kingdom. Annika has only three days to break the spell of Wenlock, an evil wizard who has turned her family to stone.

On her quest to defeat Wenlock, Annika meets new friends and together they travel to forbidden forests, skate through icy caverns and fly above the clouds as they attempt to build a magical wand of light."

== Plot ==
On her birthday, Princess Annika worries her parents by going outside to ice skate without permission and bringing home a "possibly dangerous" polar bear cub named Shiver. As a result, the overprotective King Marcus and Queen Elvina forbid her from going skating ever again.

Annoyed, Annika sneaks out to join a skating festival in the village that night. A powerful sorcerer named Wenlock appears and orders the princess to marry him. Marcus and Elvina arrive and confront Wenlock, but he laughs and cryptically reminds Marcus and Elvina of the fate of their "other daughter". When Annika refuses his proposal, Wenlock petrifies the entire village population, including Annika's parents. Annika is rescued by a winged horse named Brietta, but Wenlock warns her she has three days to marry him; otherwise, the spell will become permanent.

Brietta takes Annika to the Cloud Kingdom, ruled by Queen Rayla. Annika discovers that her parents' "other daughter" is, in fact, Brietta, who was transformed into a pegasus by Wenlock when she refused to marry him. This explains why their parents were so protective of Annika once she was born. The Cloud Queen tells Annika that the only thing that can defeat Wenlock is a "Wand of Light"; built from a measure of courage, a ring of love, and a gem of ice lit by hope's eternal flame. Despite Brietta's reluctance due to past failed attempts, Annika assures her that they can build the wand together.

Annika, Brietta, and Shiver travel to the Forbidden Forest, where they meet Aidan, a blacksmith. When Shiver and Annika fall into a giant's stew pot, Annika uses her hair ribbon to help them escape. The ribbon, Annika's exact height, is the "measure of courage", and turns into a staff for the Wand of Light. After getting a map from the gem dealer Ferris, the group finds a large cavern filled with ice gems, where Annika and Aidan take one each. Aidan reveals that he ran away from his parents after he lost all of their money gambling. He took an extra gem to bring to his parents, so they would forgive him. Brietta offers her tiara for the ring of love. With all three objects, Aidan smiths the "Wand of Light", and Annika uses it to transform Brietta back into a human.

On their way back to the Cloud Kingdom, Annika and Brietta are pursued by Wenlock, and Brietta is knocked unconscious in the chase. Enraged, Annika orders the wand to destroy Wenlock, but it doesn't work. With no other options, she gives in and finally agrees to marry him. Wenlock refuses, calling her annoying, just like his former wives, all now cursed to become trolls. He takes the wand and buries Annika in an avalanche.

Aidan helps dig Annika out. After she recuperates, the group sneaks into Wenlock's palace. Annika finds the wand, but it has been damaged and the gem breaks off and falls into the sea. Aidan offers his gem as a replacement; realizing that the wand cannot be used for vengeance, Annika breaks all of Wenlock's spells for the love of her family and her people. Wenlock is stripped of his powers, his ex-wives are restored to their true forms, and the spell on Annika's kingdom is broken. Annika and Brietta are reunited with their parents, while Aidan reconciles with his father. In the Cloud Kingdom, Annika and Aidan skate together, while the Cloud Queen Rayla lifts the wand into the sky to become a star.

== Cast ==
- Barbie as Princess Annika is a strong-headed princess who loves ice skating. She often wears light purple dresses. Initially, Annika does not understand why her parents are so overprotective of her, but after learning of Brietta's backstory, she realizes she was wrong and decides to set things right.
- Summer as Princess Brietta is Annika's older sister who was transformed into a pegasus by Wenlock on her birthday when she refused to marry him. Her dress is always pink. When Brietta is still a pegasus, she can see her human appearance when she sees herself in the mirror.
- Wenlock is a powerful sorcerer and the main antagonist. He has married three times, though he's turned his previous wives into trolls to act as his servants. When he looks for the prettiest girl to wed, he finds Annika is the right person for him. He rides a griffin named Morduke.
- Ken as Aidan is a blacksmith. He had received money from his parents, but he lost all of it in a game. In shame, he hides in the deepest part of the Forbidden Forest before he meets Annika and her sister Brietta. Annika's plight enlightens his spirit, where he decides to help Annika create the Wand of Light and save her people.
- Shiver is a polar bear who makes an acquaintance with Annika during her ice skating. She also has a liking for anything sparkly.
- Christie as Rayla, the Cloud Queen is the ruler of the Cloud Kingdom, where Brietta hid herself after Wenlock turned her into a pegasus.
- Kelly and Chelsie as Rose, Blush, and Lilac are three little girls who make colors in the clouds every dawn and dusk. Rose makes the clouds pink, Blush makes the clouds yellow and Lilac makes the clouds purple. They are Brietta's friends.
- Ollie is a barefoot, green giant that almost makes a stew out of Annika and Shiver.
- Ferris is a shady and greedy thief who runs a trading business. He's an old acquaintance of Aidan, and he gives Annika and Aidan a map that will supposedly help them find a gem to complete the Wand of Light. Later on, Wenlock transforms him into a doormat after he tries to earn money by telling Wenlock about Annika's whereabouts.
- King Marcus and Queen Elvina are the rulers of the kingdom and Annika and Brietta's parents.

== Voice cast ==
- Kelly Sheridan – Princess Annika (played by Barbie)/Troll/Wife #3
- Lalainia Lindbjerg – Princess Brietta/Troll/Wife #2
- Mark Hildreth – Aidan (played by Ken)
- Colin Murdock – Wenlock
- Kathleen Barr – Shiver / Queen Elvina / Eric / Rayla, The Cloud Queen (played by Christie)/Troll/Wife #1
- Russell Roberts – King Marcus
- Chantal Strand – Rose (played by Kelly)
- Jessica Amlee – Blush (played by Chelsie)
- Andrea Libman – Lilac (played by Kelly)
- John DeSantis – Ollie the Giant
- Brian Drummond – Ferris, Aidan's Father

== Production ==
During development, the film was originally titled Barbie 3D The Treasures of Pegasus. Early materials show that Annika was initially named Brianna, Brietta was named Peg, and the Cloud Kingdom was referred to as Cloud City.

== Music ==
Brie Larson performed the theme song for the film, entitled "Hope Has Wings". Composed by Arnie Roth, the orchestral music is from Haydn's Symphony No. 94 "Surprise" Grieg's Symphony No. 1 "Morning Mood" and Beethoven's Symphony No. 6 "Pastoral".

== See also ==
- List of Barbie films
- Barbie (media franchise)
- Barbie of Swan Lake
- Barbie in the Nutcracker
- Barbie in the 12 Dancing Princesses
