= Barbie and Stacie to the Rescue =

2024 sports adventure television film

- Genre: Adventure; Children/Family
- Written by: Kay Donmyer; Margaret Dunlap (additional)
- Directed by: Conrad Helten (film); Gene Vassilaros (voice)
- Music by: Daniel Rojas

Production
- Executive producers: Christopher Keenan; Frederic Soulie
- Producer: Jefferey R. Hawley
- Production companies: Mainframe Studios; Mattel Television Studios

Original release
- Network: Netflix
- Release: 14 March 2024

Barbie and Stacie to the Rescue is a 2024 CGI-animated adventure television film directed by Conrad Helten and written by Kay Donmyer with additional input from Margaret Dunlap. The 43rd entry in the Barbie film series and starring Barbie's middle-aged sister Stacie Roberts in a lead role, it features her family's trip to Barbie's hometown of Willows, Wisconsin for a hot air balloon festival where Stacie befriends a girl her age named Ligaya.

It was released in British cinemas on 3 March 2024 for advance screenings before the main mass theatrical release 5 days later. It premiered in the United States and globally on Netflix on the 14th and on British television via the former TV channel POP on the 23rd of the same month.

== Premise ==
The Roberts family heads to Wisconsin for a hot air balloon festival, where Stacie finds herself caught in between – too young for adult activities and too old to play with the little kids. However, when Barbie and Skipper have a ballooning mishap, it is up to Stacie to have the right skills to save the day.

== Voice cast ==
- Cassandra Morris as Stacie Roberts
- America Young as Barbie Roberts, Hazel and Tallulah
- Kirsten Day as Skipper Roberts and Veronica
- Natalie Lashkari - Chelsea Roberts
- Greg Chun as George Roberts and Marcus
- Lisa Fuson as Margaret Roberts and Ellie
- Connor Andrade as Berto
- Dino Andrade as Darius Fink
- Jovie Leigh as Ligaya
- Tara Sands as Aunt Adele

Other characters include Rookie, Zeus, Adele's two dogs Sylvie and Abby, Taffy, Honey, DJ, Xavier and his uncle.

== Reception ==
Ashley Moulton reviewed the film for Common Sense Media, commenting that it has "girl-power messages with a predictable plot" but has "mild peril".

== Soundtrack ==
The film was accompanied by a soundtrack album that was released on global online music streaming services. Its first song "Trailblazing" was released as a single on March 1, 2024, as the film's theme.

No.	Title	Length
1.	"Trailblazing"	2:38
2.	"In Between"	3:07
3.	"Better Together"	2:54
4.	"Feels Like Flying"	2:21
5.	"You're Amazing"	2:09

== Release titles globally ==
- German - Barbie & Stacie: Ein Schwester für alle Fälle (translates to Barbie & Stacie: A Sister For All Occasions)
