= Barbie: Epic Road Trip =

2022 Barbie interactive short film

- Promotional artwork
- Directed by: Conrad Helten
- Written by: Aury Wallington
- Based on: List of Barbie's friends and family by Mattel; The Barbie "Brooklyn" Roberts character from Barbie: Big City, Big Dreams by Mattel Television
- Produced by: Susan Corbin: Christopher Keenan; Frederic Soulie; Ann Austen (co-executive producers)
- Starring: America Young; Tatiana Varria; Kirsten Day; Ritesh Rajan; Greg Chun; Lisa Fuson; Dino Andrade; Melanie Minichino; Dave Fennoy
- Music by: The Math Club
- Production companies: Mattel Television; Mainframe Studios
- Distributed by: 9Go! (Australia); Netflix (United States); YTV (Canada)
- Release date: October 25, 2022
- Running time: 65 minutes
- Countries: United States; Canada
- Language: English

Barbie: Epic Road Trip or Barbie Epic Road Trip is a 2022 CGI-animated adventure comedy children's interactive television special directed by Conrad Helten and written by Aury Wallington which debuted on Netflix on 25 October.

The 41st entry in the Barbie film series, it is also the first interactive production in the Barbie media franchise. The core components of Barbie's friends and family and Barbie "Brooklyn" Roberts reprise their roles in this production.

== Background ==
The title and the promotional artwork for this film/movie was revealed by Mattel co-president, Richard L. Dickson, while putting out a presentation for analysts and the company's board of directors on 18 February 2022, which also showcased the promotional artwork for the previous production: a television film named "Barbie: Mermaid Power". The first pre-release revelation of the film was released on 10 October 2022 through Screen Rant and The Hollywood Reporter, with the latter on the back of Mattel announcing a signature of a long-term contract extension with Netflix for more Barbie-branded productions.

== Premise ==
"Barbie goes on a cross-country adventure/trek with friends and makes big decisions about the future. Which dream will she choose?"

== Voice cast ==
As per the closing credits:

- America Young as Barbie "Malibu" Roberts
- Tatiana Varria as Barbie "Brooklyn" Roberts
- Kirsten Day as Skipper
- Cassandra Lee Morris as Stacie, Headless Ghost and Match Mutts
- Cassidy Naber as Chelsea
- Ritesh Rajan as Ken
- Greg Chun as George Roberts, Subway Passenger, Burro Guy
- Lisa Fuson as Margaret Roberts, Subway Conductor and Pug Owner
- Nicolas Roye as Rafa, Peanut Guy, Goat Herder and Dinosaur Guy
- Dino Andrade as Magnifico, Old Man & Dino Fortune Teller
- Melanie Minichino as Director, Farmer Jill and Receptionist
- Channon Dade as Waitress, Stage Manager, Ticket Taker & Jacinda's Assistant 1
- Dave Fennoy as McHenry, public address system announcer and Clown
- Judy Alice Lee as Rebecca Lee & Jacinda's Assistant 2
- Alba Ponce de Leon as Jacinda

Other characters include Trey Reardon, Barbie's puppy Taffy, Ned and Ted Johnson, Bella & Ella Blue, Chuckles and Truffles.

== Music ==
The film featured only one single titled Flip the Script, which was released on 17 October 2022 on global music streaming services. It was written by Brayden Deskins, Brandon Stewart, Nicky Egan, Khristiana Parchman and Colton Fisher, produced by The Math Club and performed by Lydia Li.

== See also ==
- List of Barbie films
