= Mainframe Studios =

Canadian animation studio

- Logo used since 2020
- Formerly: Mainframe Entertainment Inc. (1993–2007); Rainmaker Entertainment Inc. (2007–2016); Rainmaker Studios (2016–2020)
- Type: Division
- Industry: Animation; Motion pictures
- Founded: 1993; 33 years ago
- Founders: Christopher Brough; Ian Pearson; Phil Mitchell; Gavin Blair; John Grace
- Headquarters: Vancouver, British Columbia, Canada
- Key people: Michael Hefferon (president and CCO)
- Products: Television films; Television shows; Feature films; Animation outsourcing
- Number of employees: >650 (2021)
- Parent: IDT Entertainment (2003–2006); Rainmaker Income Fund (2006–2008); Wow Unlimited Media (2016–present)
- Website: https://www.mainframe.ca

Mainframe Studios is a Canadian animation studio owned by Wow Unlimited Media and based in Vancouver, British Columbia. Founded in 1993 as Mainframe Entertainment Inc. by Christopher Brough, Ian Pearson, Phil Mitchell, Gavin Blair and John Grace, the company established itself as a leading contributor to the introduction of computer-generated imagery (CGI), live-action in animation, film and television.

The company previously operated as a subsidiary of Starz Inc. (at the time a division of IDT Corporation) between 2003 and 2007. Local post-production firm, Rainmaker Income Fund, acquired a majority stake in the company, initially rebranding it in the process as Rainmaker Animation and would fold into it in 2008, permanently rebranding it as Rainmaker Entertainment. Rainmaker would revive the "Mainframe Entertainment" name for its then-newly-created division meant for television production. On October 25, 2016, the company announced a triple acquisition and merger of Frederator Networks and Ezrin-Hirsh Entertainment to create the holding company, WOW! Unlimited Media, and rebrand a second time to Rainmaker Studios. In 2020, the company would rebrand a third and final time to Mainframe Studios to return to their "Mainframe Entertainment" name roots.

The company is best known for the production of the first fully computer-animated half-hour television series ReBoot; Beast Wars, a reimagined relaunch of Transformers from Hasbro; and Barbie since 2001, in collaboration with American toy company Mattel — the majority of films which later expanded into other audiovisual media to create a multimedia franchise for the flagship fashion doll property.

== History ==
=== As Mainframe Entertainment ===
The company was established in 1993 as Mainframe Entertainment Inc. by Christopher Brough, a noted Los Angeles-based animation producer and a British animation team known as "The Hub" – Gavin Blair, Ian Pearson, Phil Mitchell and John Grace. They were looking to create ReBoot, the first fully computer-animated television series, after having used the technology to produce music videos like Money for Nothing and Let's Get Rocked. Due to the cost of shipping equipment back home, advantageous tax credits and proximity to Los Angeles, the company set-up shop in Vancouver, Canada.

In 1994, ReBoot launched on ABC in the United States and YTV in Canada. The series intermittently ran for four seasons with production ending in 2001. The company's second project was produced for American toy company Hasbro. Beast Wars (known in Canada as Beasties), a relaunch of the Transformers brand, debuted in 1996 and concluded in 1999. A follow-up, Beast Machines was produced between 1999 and 2000. Both ReBoot and Beast Wars were produced with Alliance Communications, who had taken a 50% ownership of Mainframe. In 1996, Mainframe paid $17 million to reduce Alliance's share to 15%.

Mainframe became a publicly traded company with a listing on the Toronto Stock Exchange on June 17, 1997. In conjunction with the public offering, Alliance sold 700,000 shares in the company, lowering their ownership to 7.8%. Christopher Brough became the CEO, Pearson the president, Blair as director of operations and Mitchell as Blair's assistant/vice. In its first year on the stock exchange, Mainframe posted an $11 million loss despite producing hit multi-award-winning computer-animated shows during this period.

Mainframe opened its American division in Los Angeles on April 17, 1998, to be led by Dan DiDio and oversee content development, production and local distribution. DiDio previously worked with Mainframe through his stint as executive director of children's programming at ABC.

After having earlier produced two ReBoot themed rides for the company, the IMAX Corporation made a $16 million investment in the company in 1999, which gave IMAX roughly 30% ownership of Mainframe, included the creation of a new joint venture meant to facilitate the creation of animated films based on Gulliver's Travels and Pied Piper, with a third project titled Pandora’s Box. The films were intended to be stereoscopic, 3D feature-length releases, though none of the three saw completion.

At the end of the 1999 fiscal year, the company reported a $17 million loss. Thanks to episode deliveries for Beast Machines, Beast Wars, Shadow Raiders and Weird-Ohs, the company posted its first profit of $1.4 million in fiscal 2000. Buoyed by Heavy Gear, Action Man and their first direct-to-video film, Casper's Haunted Christmas, Mainframe posted another profit of $2.4 million for fiscal 2001. Despite the success, the company faced a major management shakeup that year. Pearson had stepped down as president in June and left the company shortly after, with fellow co-founders Blair and Mitchell also leaving in 2002 and 2005, respectively.

In 2001, American toymaker Mattel collaborated with Mainframe to produce Barbie in the Nutcracker. The direct-to-video feature sold more than 3.4 million units in its first year. The success of the release led to a longstanding relationship between Mattel and the animation studio. Mainframe (and its successors) would later produce the majority of the franchise's direct-to-video films, as well as a television series.

Following financial losses of $18.9 million and $7.5 million in fiscal 2002 and 2003, the American IDT Corporation announced it would purchase 56% of Mainframe for $14 million on September 16, 2003. After the cancellation of Spider-Man: The New Animated Series that same year, the company moved away from producing television series. While a number of projects were announced they ultimately did not see fruition, including a pre-school oriented ReBoot spin-off called Binomes as well as Mainframe's first live-action production, an adaptation of Harriet the Spy. In 2005, the company acquired the distribution rights to the live-action/CGI-animated television series Zixx. Mainframe also provided animation for the show's second and third seasons in conjunction with Thunderbird Films. The bulk of the company's work now consisted of direct-to-video projects and television specials.

After producing the visuals for the 2003 MTV Movie Awards, Mainframe started a creative services division to produce video game animation, graphic design, motion graphics, titling, show opening sequences and branding in 2005. This branch of the company worked on a number of projects, including cut-scenes for Prototype, 50 Cent: Blood on the Sand and Ghostbusters: The Video Game, as well as the 2006 MTV Movie Awards.

=== As Rainmaker ===
Rainmaker logo used from 2007 to 2017

Finding itself under new ownership, IDT sold its 62% stake in Mainframe to Vancouver-based post-production firm Rainmaker Income Fund on July 20, 2006, for $13.8 million. The next month Rainmaker announced it would acquire the remaining 38% of Mainframe. On January 30, 2007, Mainframe was renamed to Rainmaker Animation. Later that year, Rainmaker sold its visual effects and post-production divisions to Deluxe Entertainment Services Group, leaving only the animation business.

In June 2012, Chinese animation studio Xing Xing Digital announced its intent to purchase Rainmaker, with the company willing to pay off Rainmaker's $7 million debt. The purchase was called off after Rainmaker and Xing Xing were unable to finalize the sale by September 14, 2012.

In 2013, Rainmaker completed its first theatrical feature film, Escape from Planet Earth. Directed by Cal Brunker, it received mixed reviews from critics but was a mild success financially, grossing around $75 million worldwide. On October 7 that same year, Rainmaker launched a television production division and revived the "Mainframe Entertainment" brand for its title, starting with a CGI-animated incarnation of Bob the Builder.

Rainmaker released its second theatrical feature film, Ratchet & Clank based on the video game series of the same name by Insomniac Games, in the first quarter of 2016 to financial failure. This poor reception to the film caused Rainmaker to take a $10 million impairment charge on their investment in the production and was later cited as the reason the company abandoned plans to adapt the Sly Cooper video game franchise into a theatrical film.

Later that year on October 25, Rainmaker announced their intent to acquire and merge Erzin-Hirsh Entertainment and American-based Frederator Networks (and its main division, Frederator Studios) and consolidate them under its then-new holding company, WOW! Unlimited Media Inc.(TSX:WOW.A) At that time, the company changed the names of its home-base divisions to Rainmaker Studios and Mainframe Studios. Since the reorganization, the company has been heavily involved in television production animating ReBoot: The Guardian Code, a live-action/CGI-animated re-imagining of the ReBoot brand, Barbie: Dreamhouse Adventures, the first-ever full-length TV series in the "Barbie" media franchise and Spy Kids: Mission Critical, the animated reboot/spin-off of the Spy Kids (franchise) in 2018. In 2019, the studio released its first traditionally-animated production, a pilot based on Knowledge Network mascots made in Toon Boom Harmony.

=== As Mainframe Studios ===
On March 16, 2020, the studio announced it would be rebranding as Mainframe Studios and consolidate Rainmaker Studios under the "Mainframe" branding and fully returning the studio to their original "Mainframe" name. Due to the COVID-19 pandemic, Mainframe Studios initiated remote work measures for its employees.

On June 24, 2021, the company confirmed that it would develop a 2D-animation pipeline in support of its first production in the medium, an animated series inspired by YouTube personality Guava Juice. The following August, Mainframe announced that it would open a virtual studio in Toronto in the east of the country, building upon its earlier remote work experience.

== Productions list ==
=== Television series ===
Title	Years	Network	Co-production with	Notes
as Mainframe Entertainment
ReBoot	1994–2001	YTV; ABC; Syndication; Cartoon Network (Toonami)	Alliance Communications (seasons 1–3); Shaw Communications (season 3); BLT Productions; ReBoot Productions; Claster Television; Zondag Productions	
Beast Wars: Transformers	1996–1999	Syndication; YTV; TV Tokyo	Hasbro; Alliance Communications (seasons 1–2); Alliance Atlantis (season 3); Claster Television; BLT Productions	Based on the Hasbro toyline and the sequel to The Transformers.
Shadow Raiders	1998–1999	Syndication; YTV; TV Tokyo	Alliance Atlantis	Based on the Trendmasters toyline War Planets.
Weird-Ohs	1999–2000	Fox Family; YTV	Decode Entertainment; EM.TV & Merchandising AG; Testors Corporation	Based on the Hawk Company toyline.
Beast Machines: Transformers	1999–2000	Fox Kids; YTV	Hasbro	Based on the Hasbro toyline, the sequel to Beast Wars: Transformers and the final installment of the Generation 1 era.
Action Man	2000–2001	Fox Kids; YTV	Hasbro; Saban Entertainment	Based on the Hasbro toyline.
Heavy Gear: The Animated Series	2001–2002	Syndication	Paradox Entertainment; Dream Pod 9; Adelaide Productions; Columbia TriStar Television	Based on the video game published by Dream Pod 9 and licensed by Paradox Entertainment.
Max Steel	2001–2002	Cartoon Network	Adelaide Productions; Columbia TriStar Television	Season 3 only. Based on the Mattel toyline.
Spider-Man: The New Animated Series	2003	MTV	Marvel Enterprises; Adelaide Productions; Sony Pictures Television	Based on the characters by Stan Lee and Steve Ditko.
Zixx	2005–2009	YTV	The Nightingale Company; Thunderbird Entertainment	Seasons 2–3 only. Originally produced as Mainframe Entertainment in season 2, then Rainmaker Animation/Entertainment in season 3.
as Mainframe Studios
Bob the Builder (2015)	2015–2017	Channel 5	HiT Entertainment (series 1–2); Mattel Creations (series 2–3)	Series 1–2 only. DHX Media took over for the final series.
ReBoot: The Guardian Code	2018	Netflix; YTV	ReBoot Productions; Corus Entertainment	Reimagined series based on ReBoot.
Spy Kids: Mission Critical	2018	Netflix	Dimension Television	Based on the Spy Kids franchise.
Barbie Dreamhouse Adventures	2018–2020	Netflix	Mattel Television	Based on the Mattel toyline.
Octonauts	2019–present	CBeebies	Sony Pictures Television Kids	Based on the books by Meomi. Season 5 only.
Madagascar: A Little Wild	2020–2022	Hulu; Peacock	DreamWorks Animation Television	Based on the Madagascar franchise. Animation services.
The Guava Juice Show	2021–2022	YouTube	Studio71	First 2D-animated series produced by the studio.
Octonauts: Above & Beyond	2021–2026	Netflix	Sony Pictures Television Kids	Based on the books by Meomi and sequel to Octonauts.
Barbie: It Takes Two	2022	Netflix	Mattel Television	Based on the Mattel toyline and the TV series follow-up to the 2021 film Barbie: Big City, Big Dreams.
Team Zenko Go	2022	Netflix	DreamWorks Animation Television	Based on the books by Chris Tougas.
Barbie: A Touch of Magic	2023–2024	Netflix	Mattel Television	Based on the Mattel toyline.
Unicorn Academy	2023–present	Netflix	Spin Master Entertainment	Animation services. Based on the books by Julia Sykes.
SuperKitties	2024–present	Disney Junior	Sony Pictures Television Kids	Animation production; Season 2–present.
It's Andrew!	2025–present	Kartoon Channel; CBC Kids; ABC Kids	Pirate Size Productions; Infinite Studios	
Phoebe & Jay	2026–present	PBS Kids	Phoebe & Jay Productions	
JumpScare	TBA	TBA	Scholastic Entertainment; Man of Action Entertainment	

=== Films ===
==== Theatrical ====
Title	Release date	Director	Writer(s)	Producer(s)	Composer(s)	Co-production with	Distribution	Note
Escape from Planet Earth	February 15, 2013	Cal Brunker	Bob Barlen; Cal Brunker	Catherine Winder; Luke Carroll; Brian Inerfeld	Aaron Zigman	GRF Productions	The Weinstein Company (United States); Entertainment One (Canada)	
Ratchet & Clank	April 29, 2016	Kevin Munroe	T.J. Fixman; Kevin Munroe; Gerry Swallow	Brad Foxhoven; Kim Dent Wilder; David Wohl	Evan Wise	Blockade Entertainment; PlayStation Originals	Focus Features (through Gramercy Pictures, United States); Universal Pictures (Canada); Cinema Management Group (international)	Based on the eponymous video game series by Insomniac Games and Sony Interactive Entertainment.
Upcoming
Heroes at Large	2027	Chris Jenkins		TBA	TBA	GFM Animation; Kartoon Studios	TBA	
Silver Sentinel	2027	Todd Edwards; Timothy Hooten		TBA	TBA	GFM Animation; Kartoon Studios	TBA	

==== Television ====
Title	Release date	Notes
as Mainframe Entertainment
Scary Godmother: Halloween Spooktakular	October 26, 2003	
Hot Wheels: AcceleRacers – Ignition	January 8, 2005	
Hot Wheels: AcceleRacers – The Speed of Silence	March 19, 2005	
Hot Wheels: AcceleRacers – Breaking Point	June 25, 2005	
Hot Wheels: AcceleRacers – The Ultimate Race	October 1, 2005	
Scary Godmother: The Revenge of Jimmy	October 25, 2005	
as Rainmaker Studios
Barbie: Dolphin Magic	September 17, 2017	Debuted on YTV in Canada before its release in the United States on Netflix a day later. The only "Barbie" film under the Rainmaker Studios banner.
Elliot the Littlest Reindeer	November 30, 2018	Produced in collaboration with Awesometown Entertainment.
as Mainframe Studios
Barbie: Princess Adventure	September 1, 2020	Released on Netflix; The first film under the unified Mainframe Studios name.
Barbie & Chelsea: The Lost Birthday	April 16, 2021	Released on Netflix
Barbie: Big City, Big Dreams	September 1, 2021	Released on Netflix
Barbie: Mermaid Power	September 1, 2022	Released on Netflix
Barbie: Epic Road Trip	October 25, 2022	Released on Netflix; Interactive film
Barbie: Skipper and the Big Babysitting Adventure	March 16, 2023	Released on Netflix
Barbie and Stacie to the Rescue	March 14, 2024	Released on Netflix
Barbie & Teresa: Recipe for Friendship	March 6, 2025	Released on Netflix

==== Direct-to-video ====
Title	Release date	Notes
as Mainframe Entertainment
Casper's Haunted Christmas	October 31, 2000	
Barbie in the Nutcracker	October 23, 2001	
Barbie as Rapunzel	October 1, 2002	
Hot Wheels: World Race	2003	
Barbie of Swan Lake	September 30, 2003	
Max Steel: Endangered Species	2004	
Barbie as the Princess and the Pauper	September 28, 2004	
Popeye's Voyage: The Quest for Pappy	November 9, 2004	
Max Steel: Forces of Nature	2005	
Barbie: Fairytopia	March 8, 2005	
Inspector Gadget's Biggest Caper Ever	June 17, 2005	
Barbie and the Magic of Pegasus	September 20, 2005	
Stuart Little 3: Call of the Wild	February 21, 2006	Co-production with Sony Pictures Home Entertainment and Red Wagon Productions
Max Steel: Countdown	2006	
Arthur's Missing Pal	2006	
Barbie Fairytopia: Mermaidia	March 14, 2006	
Tony Hawk in Boom Boom Sabotage	September 12, 2006	
Barbie in the 12 Dancing Princesses	September 19, 2006	
Barbie Fairytopia: Magic of the Rainbow	March 13, 2007	The last film under the name of Mainframe Entertainment.
as Rainmaker Animation
Barbie as the Island Princess	September 18, 2007	The only "Barbie" film under the name of Rainmaker Animation.
Max Steel: Dark Rival	October 2007	
as Rainmaker Entertainment
Barbie: Mariposa and Her Butterfly Fairy Friends	February 26, 2008	First production under the "Rainmaker Entertainment" name following the merger with and the fold-up of Rainmaker Digital Effects.
Barbie & the Diamond Castle	September 9, 2008	
Max Steel: Bio Crisis	October 2008	
Barbie in A Christmas Carol	November 4, 2008	
The Nutty Professor	November 25, 2008	Co-production with The Weinstein Company
Max Steel vs. The Mutant Menace	2009	
Barbie: Thumbelina	March 17, 2009	
Barbie and the Three Musketeers	September 15, 2009	
Barbie in A Mermaid Tale	March 2, 2010	
Barbie: A Fashion Fairytale	September 14, 2010	
Max Steel vs. The Toxic Legion	2010	
Barbie: A Fairy Secret	March 15, 2011	
Max Steel: Makino's Revenge	2011	
Barbie: Princess Charm School	September 13, 2011	
Barbie in A Mermaid Tale 2	February 27, 2012	
Barbie: The Princess and the Popstar	September 11, 2012	
Max Steel: Monstrous Alliance	2012	
Barbie: Mariposa & The Fairy Princess	August 27, 2013	
Barbie: The Pearl Princess	February 15, 2014	
Barbie and the Secret Door	August 7, 2014	
Barbie in Princess Power	February 26, 2015	
Barbie in Rock 'N Royals	August 13, 2015	
Barbie: Spy Squad	January 15, 2016	The last production under the "Mattel Playground Productions" division of Mattel before its fold-up into Mattel Creations.
Barbie and Her Sisters In A Puppy Chase	October 18, 2016	Additional animation and post-production.
Barbie: Video Game Hero	January 31, 2017	The last film under the "Rainmaker Entertainment" banner.

=== Scrapped projects ===
Title	Network	Co-production with	Notes
Made by Maddie	Nickelodeon	Silvergate Media	

=== Other credits ===
- 50 Cent: Blood on the Sand (video game trailer)
- Ghostbusters: The Video Game (Pre-rendered cutscenes)
- Ghost Hunter Dax
- Good Boy! (CGI effects)
- Harriet the Spy
- Legion of 5
- Luna, Chip & Inkie in The Festival of Wishes
- The Outer Limits (1995-2001) (CGI effects)
- 2003 MTV Movie Awards
- 2006 MTV Movie Awards
- Prototype (video game trailer)
- WET (video game trailer)
- Ratchet & Clank: Life of Pie (2021)
- Ready2Robot (web-series)
- Stargate SG-1 (1997-2007) (CGI effects)

== See also ==
- Blue Sky Studios
- Nitrogen Studios
- DreamWorks Animation
- Pixar
- Locksmith Animation
- Warner Bros. Pictures Animation
- Paramount Animation
- Sony Pictures Animation
- Reel FX Animation
