= Barbie in a Mermaid Tale 2 =

- DVD cover
- Directed by: William Lau
- Written by: Elise Allen
- Produced by: Harry Linden
- Starring: Kelly Sheridan; Ashleigh Ball; Nicole Oliver; Kathleen Barr; Tabitha St. Germain
- Music by: BC Smith
- Production company: Rainmaker Entertainment Barbie Entertainment
- Distributed by: Universal Studios Home Entertainment
- Release date: February 27, 2012
- Running time: 73 minutes
- Countries: United States; Canada
- Language: English

Barbie in a Mermaid Tale 2 is a 2012 CGI-animated fantasy film directed by William Lau and produced by Mattel Entertainment (under the name of Barbie Entertainment) with Rainmaker Entertainment. It was first released to DVD on February 27, 2012, and later made its television debut on Nickelodeon on March 25, 2012. The twenty-second entry in the Barbie film series, it is a standalone sequel to Barbie in A Mermaid Tale and marks the return of Kelly Sheridan as the voice of Barbie. The plot follows the story of Merliah Summers who travels to Australia for the ultimate surfing competition. But when a sinister mermaid schemes to take over the ocean kingdom, she finds herself racing the clock to save the merfolk and stop Eris' ambition in time for the big surfing competition.

== Official description ==
"Surf's up for Barbie as she returns as Merliah, the surfing champion who's also a mermaid princess! In this sea-quel, Merliah heads to Australia for a surfing competition. When the mermaid Eris escapes from her whirlpool with plans to take over the throne of Oceana, Merliah and her sea friends dive in to stop her. . It's a new adventure where Merliah learns that anything is possible and she can have the best of both worlds!"

== Plot ==
A year after the events of the previous film, Merliah Summers is competing in the heats of an invitational surf-meet. Merliah wins first place, narrowly beating rival surfer, Kylie Morgan, though both get to compete in the finals in Australia.

Merliah uses her magical necklace to transform into a mermaid and tells her mother Queen Calissa the good news. Calissa is preparing for the Changing of Tides Ceremony to be held at the ancient city of Aquellia deep in the waters of New Zealand, which is performed every twenty years to bless a member of her royal family with the power to spin Merillia. Calissa expects Merliah to attend, but the surfing competition is on exactly the same day, causing them to argue, after which they part ways.

In Australia, during the next round of the meet, Kylie beats Merliah when she deliberately brushes Merliah's surfboard and causes her to wipe out. Despite Kylie's win, Merliah's handstand maneuver attracts the attention of the crowd. That night, at a luau, Kylie is approached by a rainbowfish named Alistair who tells her that Merliah has powers that give her an advantage with surfing. Following Alistair's advice, Kylie steals the necklace, which Merliah has taken off for a photoshoot, puts it on and turns into a mermaid. Alistair then lures Kylie underwater to the deep trench where Eris is still trapped in a whirlpool. Snouts the sea lion, who witnessed Kylie's transformation, secretly follows them. Alistair and Eris trick Kylie into entering the whirlpool, taking Eris' place and freeing her.

Snouts returns to the surface to fetch Merliah. Merliah follows Snouts to the trench and frees Kylie from the whirlpool, causing it to destabilize and self-destruct. Kylie thanks Merliah and apologizes for stealing her necklace; but keeps it for the time being as she finds she cannot breathe underwater without it. Kylie then promises Merliah to help her stop Eris.

Eris and Alistair travel to Aquellia so that Eris can perform the Changing of Tides ceremony herself. Along the way, they meet a group of large, powerful fish called Stargazers. Eris threatens them with her new spell which bring people's worst fears to life, and they agree to obey her. While Calissa and the ambassadors of the ocean—Mirabella, Kattrin, Selena, and Renata—are waiting for the midday sun for the ceremony to begin, they are attacked by Eris. Eris manages to cast her spell on Calissa, whose tail becomes heavy and drags her down, trapping her at the bottom of the ocean. Eris casts the spell on all the ambassadors and cages them.

Merliah, Kylie, and Snouts meet up with Zuma and Calissa; Calissa and Merliah reconcile. As Calissa is unable to move because of the spell, Merliah decides to perform the ceremony in her place, even though doing so will make her a mermaid permanently. Merliah, Kylie, Zuma, and Snouts go to Aquellia, where they manage to get past the Stargazers and free the ambassadors. Merliah manages to get on the throne at the right time, but it doesn't work as she isn't in mermaid form. Kylie holds her breath and passes the necklace to Merliah in time. The ceremony is completed, undoing all of Eris's spells and giving Merliah a new tail. Eris tries to cast her spell on Merliah, but she reflects it back to Eris. Eris's worst fear manifests and her tail is transformed into legs. Merliah quickly swims to Kylie and gives the necklace back before she drowns. The ambassadors arrest Eris and take her away.

Merliah, Calissa, and Kylie swim to the surface in time for the surf meet finals. Calissa allows Kylie to keep the necklace since she has proven herself by helping them. Although Merliah has accepted her duty, she wishes that she could be human again and her legs magically return by themselves. Calissa explains that the ceremony turns whoever performs it into their true self, and Merliah's true self is both mermaid and human.

During the competition, Merliah is distracted by her newfound ability to create Merillia when she touches the water. Kylie wins and brings Merliah on stage to share the trophy in front of the cheering crowd.

== Cast ==
- Merliah Summers (voiced by Kelly Sheridan) A surfing champion who is a human and a mermaid princess. She's the crown princess of Oceana and has an orange and pink tail. She is kind, sassy, athletic, brave, strong, and cares a lot about everything in her life.
- Kylie Morgan (voiced by Ashleigh Ball) is introduced in the film as an Australian surfer who is Merliah's biggest rival in the surfing contest. Jealous of Merliah, she is tricked into freeing Eris out of a whirlpool, but in the end teams up with Merliah to save the ocean and becomes her friend in the process. As a mermaid, she has a purple tail, and is an ambassador in the doll line.
- Queen Calissa (voiced by Nicole Oliver) Merliah's mother, a mermaid with a blue and yellow tail. She's the Queen of Oceana. She is a fair and brave woman. Her worst nightmare is when she does not have the ability to swim.
- Eris (voiced by Kathleen Barr) an evil mermaid with an orange tail who was trapped in a whirlpool at the end of the first movie. She is Calissa's evil younger sister and Merliah's aunt, who wants to dethrone Calissa and force others to worship her. To this end, she uses a new spell that forces everyone's worst nightmares to come true. Her own worst nightmare is having legs.
- Zuma (voiced by Tabitha St. Germain) a pink bottlenose dolphin who is friends with Merliah.
- Snouts (voiced by Kathleen Barr) is a helpful sea lion who is friends with Merliah.
- Fallon Casey (voiced by Nakia Burrise) is one of Merliah's best friends. She is talented surfer who kicks it on the waves.
- Hadley (voiced by Maryke Hendrikse) is one of Merliah's best friends. Despite being somewhat odd-mannered, she is regarded as an excellent surfer.
- Break Summers (voiced by Garry Chalk) is Merliah's paternal grandfather, the father of Merliah's dad, who was a human.
- Ambassador Mirabella (voiced by Britt Irvin) is one of the ambassadors of Oceana. She likes thinking big and her worst fear is being trapped in small spaces. She is from the Southern Ocean.
- Ambassador Kattrin (voiced by Kira Tozer) is one of the ambassadors of Oceana. She likes being fast and her worst fear is being slow. She is from the Indian Ocean.
- Ambassador Selena (voiced by Barbara Tyson) is one of the ambassadors of Oceana. She is very conscious about her appearance and her worst fear is being ugly. She is from the Arctic Ocean.
- Ambassador Renata (voiced by Bethany Brown) is one of the ambassadors of Oceana. She is very confident and doesn't appear to be scared of anything and her worst fear is being unconfident and shy. She is from the Atlantic Ocean.

== Soundtrack ==
1. "Do the mermaid"
2. "Queen of the Waves"
3. "Easy"

== See also ==
- List of Barbie films
