= Barbie: Thumbelina =

2009 film by Conrad Helten

- DVD cover art
- Directed by: Conrad Helten
- Written by: Elise Allen
- Based on: Thumbelina by Hans Christian Andersen
- Produced by: Luke Carroll and Tiffany Shuttleworth
- Starring: Kelly Sheridan; Anna Cummer
- Music by: Eric Colvin
- Production companies: Mattel Entertainment; Mainframe Entertainment
- Distributed by: Universal Studios Home Entertainment (Note: Released under Entertainment Rights/Classic Media outside North America, with Right Entertainment distributing in the United Kingdom); Kidtoon Films
- Release date: March 17, 2009
- Running time: 75 minutes
- Countries: Canada; United States
- Language: English

Barbie: Thumbelina (also known as Barbie Presents: Thumbelina) is a 2009 CGI-animated fantasy film directed by Conrad Helten. It was released on March 17, 2009, and it made its television premiere on Nick Jr. UK on December 24, 2012. The fifteenth film in the Barbie film series, it is a modern retelling of Hans Christian Andersen's fairy tale Thumbelina. The film centers around Thumbelina, a "twillerbee" who befriends a human girl, and both must cooperate their strength in order to save the environment. This was the last Barbie movie to be distributed by Entertainment Rights outside North America before their closure and Mattel signing a new deal with Universal Pictures outside North America.

== Plot ==
Barbie and her kindergarten students walking in a big meadow, ready to plant trees. Emma, one of the children, finds a small tree and decides to plant it, but her friends laugh at her because of it, making it sad. However, Barbie cheers her up by telling her that a small tree can grow into a very big tree, then tells the children the story of Thumbelina.

Thumbelina is one of the Twillerbees, wingless fairies who spawn from flowers and whose magic affects plant growth. Learning that some Twillerbuds are growing and will soon open to reveal new Twillerbabies, Thumbelina constructs false wing gliders for herself and her friends Janessa and Chrysella, so they can monitor the Twillerbud flowers until the babies are "born".

Construction vehicles arrive in the field and remove part of the flowerbed, with the three friends hiding inside. The plants, now potted, are placed in an apartment belonging to the parents of a wealthy girl named Makena; she keeps the flowers in her bedroom. As Thumbelina, Chrysella, and Janessa search for a way to go back to their field, Makena's dog, Poofles, runs after them to catch them. Makena comes into the bedroom while the trio hides. Makena talks to her friend Violet on a cell phone about her parents, who intend to build a factory on the Twillerbees' field. An upset Thumbelina reveals herself and scolds Makena; Makena, surprised, sees the ownership of a Twillerbee as a way to one-up Violet, whom she always competes with.

The three Twillerbees try, unsuccessfully, to escape from Makena and Poofles. Finally, Thumbelina is able to send Chrysella and Janessa home, to disturb the work in the field while Thumbelina talks to Makena. Thumbelina makes Makena promise to persuade her parents to stop building the factory, and not to tell anyone about her. In return, Thumbelina agrees to create special plants for Makena.

Makena, determined to show off in front of her friends, agrees to the deal but only perfunctorily talks to her parents about the factory project. She also breaks her promise and brings Violet and another girl named Ashlynn to show off Thumbelina and her powers. Thumbelina angrily leaves, and Makena realizes that the other two badly-behaved girls are not her true friends so Makena sends them back home. Missing Thumbelina's companionship, Makena goes to the field and begs forgiveness. Thumbelina reveals the rest of the Twillerbees and the Twillerbuds to Makena, who becomes determined to save them.

That night, Makena, Thumbelina, Janessa, Chrysella, Poofles, and Lola the bird all work hard in a greenhouse to grow the plants. The next day, Makena shows her parents the result and asks them to stop the building. Thumbelina appears and explains to the adults about the Twillerbuds that will bloom soon. Evan and Vanessa, Makena's parents, are convinced and agree to stop Myron, the foreman, from removing the plants from the field.

Thanks to some birds and the other Twillerbees, Myron's workers—Louie, Rick, and Carla—are tricked into believing the field is haunted and flee. However, Myron is angry and determined to finish his work, as he is allergic to flowers and wants them gone. Ultimately, Makena and Thumbelina arrive and halt Myron long enough for Evan and Vanessa to arrive at the field and have the factory project cancelled. A flock of birds chases Myron away, and Makena and her family watch the Twillerbuds bloom. To protect the plants in the field, the field is turned into a Reserved Park.

As Barbie finishes the story, she reveals they are in the Reserved Park. Barbie says that even the smallest person can make a big difference; Makena is small, compared to the other adults, just like the children. Barbie waves at Thumbelina, Janessa and Chrysella, and they make Emma's tree grow.

== Cast ==
- Barbie - Kelly Sheridan
- Thumbelina - Anna Cummer
- Makena - Kelly Metzger
- Chrysella - Tabitha St. Germain
- Janessa - Cathy Weseluck
- Vanessa - Kathleen Barr
- Evan - Peter New
- Poofles - Brian Drummond
- Myron - Louis Chirillo
- Louie - Garry Chalk
- Rick - Mackenzie Gray
- Carla - France Perras
- Violet - Ashleigh Ball
- Emma - Natasha Calis

== See also ==
- List of Barbie films
- Barbie (media franchise)
- Barbie: Fairytopia
