= America Young =

American actress

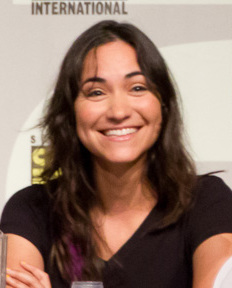
- Young at the 2012 San Diego Comic-Con
- Occupation: Actress
- Years active: 1999–present
- Known for: Voice of Barbie (2018–present)
- Website: Official website

America Young is an American actress. She has been the current voice of Barbie in the Barbie Vlogger web series since its launch on YouTube in 2015 and succeeded Erica Lindbeck as her main voice outright in the Barbie media franchise since the debut of Barbie Dreamhouse Adventures in 2018.

== Filmography ==
=== Film ===
| Year | Title | Role | Notes |
|---|---|---|---|
| 2003 | The Archies in Jug Man | Betty Cooper | Voice, direct-to-video |
| 2004 | Great Lengths | Jess | Short |
| 2004 | Starkweather | Barbara Fugate | |
| 2004 | Toi and Poochie | Cindy | |
| 2005 | Promtroversy | Stacy | Short |
| 2005 | Evil's City | Misty | Video |
| 2006 | Daños del amor | Mia | Short |
| 2006 | Point of Contact | Sara | |
| 2007 | The Long Way Back | Lisa | Short |
| 2007 | Ultimate Weapon | Serena Parnet | Short |
| 2008 | Bundy: An American Icon | Gloria | Video |
| 2008 | Tinker Bell | Wendy Darling | Voice, direct-to-video |
| 2009 | Freshmyn | Carey | Short |
| 2009 | Mugging | Helena | Short |
| 2010–2016 | The Monster High films | Toralei Stripe | Voice, direct-to-video |
| 2010 | Dreamkiller | Erin O'Dowell | |
| 2010 | The Dead Undead | Shelly | |
| 2010 | The Binds That Tie Us | Jocelyn | Short |
| 2010 | Mia | Mia | Short |
| 2010 | Abandoned | Amanda | |
| 2010 | Cruelle to be Kind | Medusa | Short |
| 2011 | A Hidden Agender | Dr. Malco | Short |
| 2011 | The Velvet Mouse Show | Sadie St. James | Video short |
| 2012 | Far | Rock Star | Short |
| 2012 | Retroland | Charlie Hayes | Video short |
| 2013 | Lost on Purpose | Monique | |
| 2013 | Wonder Woman | Penelope | Short |
| 2015 | Mockinjay: Burn | Comm. Paylor | Short |
| 2015 | Metroid: The Sky Calls | Samus Aran | Short fan film |
| 2015 | Selection | Elizabeth | Short |
| 2016 | The Sable Corsair | Sith Witch | Short |
| 2016 | Diani & Devine Meet the Apocalypse | Penny | |
| 2017 | Teenage Mutant Ninja Turtles | Frieda | Short |
| 2020 | Barbie: Princess Adventure | Barbie (voice) | Netflix TV special |
| 2021 | Barbie & Chelsea: The Lost Birthday | Barbie (voice) | Netflix TV special |
| 2021 | Barbie: Big City, Big Dreams | Barbie (voice) | Netflix TV special |
| 2022 | Barbie: Mermaid Power | Barbie (voice) | Netflix TV special |
| 2022 | Barbie: Epic Road Trip | Barbie (voice) | Netflix TV special |
| 2023 | Barbie: Skipper and the Big Babysitting Adventure | Barbie (voice) | Netflix TV special |
| 2024 | Barbie & Stacie to the Rescue | Barbie (voice) | Netflix TV special |
| 2025 | Barbie & Teresa: Recipe for Friendship | Barbie (voice) | Netflix TV special |

=== Television ===
| Year | Title | Role | Notes |
|---|---|---|---|
| 1999 | Archie's Weird Mysteries | Betty Cooper | Voice, TV series |
| 2003 | Time Kid | Lira (voice) | TV film |
| 2006 | Trollz | Shale | Voice, 2 episodes |
| 2008 | Hackett | Kate | TV film |
| 2009 | The Romantic Foibles of Esteban | Emily | Episode: "Yoked" |
| 2009 | Catherine & Annie | Maria | TV film |
| 2009 | Damsels and Dragons | The Monster | TV series |
| 2010 | Stalker Chronicles | Gladys | Episode: "Return to Sender" |
| 2010 | First Edition | Lori Banks | TV series |
| 2011–15 | Monster High (web series) | Toralei Stripe, Howleen Wolf | Voice |
| 2011 | Goodnight Burbank | Holly Johnson | TV series |
| 2011 | Solicitation | Chloe Reynolds | TV film |
| 2011 | Once Upon | Layla | Episode: "Origins: Parts 3, 4, 5" |
| 2011–2013 | Geek Therapy | Geek Therapist | TV series |
| 2012 | Mask & Cape | | 3 episodes |
| 2012–2014 | BAMF Girls Club | Katniss | TV series |
| 2013 | LearningTown | Do It Girl | Episode: "Pilot" |
| 2016 | The Comics Trip | | TV series |
| 2018–2020 | Barbie Dreamhouse Adventures | Barbie | Voice, Netflix TV series |
| 2022 | Barbie: It Takes Two | Barbie | Voice, Netflix TV series |
| 2022–24 | Monster High | Euryle Gorgon | TV series |
| 2023 | Obliterated | | Director of episode "Walks Of Shame" |
| 2023–2024 | Barbie: A Touch of Magic | Barbie | Voice, Netflix TV series |

=== Video games ===
| Year | Title | Role | Notes |
|---|---|---|---|
| 2022 | Gotham Knights | Barbara Gordon / Batgirl | Voice and mo-cap performance |
