= Barbie & Chelsea: The Lost Birthday =

2021 Barbie television film

- Promotional artwork
- Genre: Comedy; Adventure; Tropical; Children/Family
- Based on: Barbie's friends and family by Mattel
- Written by: Ann Austen; Nathaniel "Nate" Federman
- Story by: Charlotte Fullerton
- Directed by: Cassandra Mackay
- Voices of: America Young; Kirsten Day; Cassandra Morris; Cassidy Naber; Lisa Fuson; Greg Chun; Laila Berzins; Ben Pronsky; Jacob Craner
- Composers: Ryan Franks; Scott Nickoley

Production
- Executive producers: Christopher Keenan; Adam Bonnet; Frederic Soulie; Ann Austen
- Editors: Colin Adams (lead); Emir Gidel; Bruno Kohler; Marc-Andre Monten; Gonda-Bastian Sinagowitz
- Production companies: Mainframe Studios; Mattel Television

Original release
- Network: Netflix
- Release: April 16, 2021

Barbie & Chelsea: The Lost Birthday is a 2021 CGI-animated adventure comedy television film directed by Cassandra "Cassi Simonds" Mackay and written by Ann Austen and Nathaniel "Nate" Federman from a story by Charlotte Fullerton.

The 38th entry in the Barbie film series and the third to feature Barbie's family and/or friends after Barbie Dreamhouse Adventures and Barbie: Princess Adventure, it was first released on 16 April 2021 on Netflix in the United States and globally. The film plot centers on Barbie's in-universe youngest sister, Chelsea Roberts, as she goes on a fantasy-themed adventure on a jungle island to save her 7th birthday she thinks is lost whiles with her family on an adventure cruise ship which by one late night crosses the International Date Line. The film release was accompanied by its soundtrack album, Barbie & Chelsea: The Lost Birthday and More!, which was released on global music streaming services.

== Plot ==
The Roberts family goes on an adventure cruise for Chelsea's 7th birthday. Margaret is busy but promises Chelsea that the next day will be dedicated to her. So Chelsea, with her stuffed toys and sisters; Barbie, Skipper, and Stacie, search for the perfect place on the ship to celebrate the birthday. First, Stacie finds a basketball bouncy house, but the Activities Director says that Chelsea's height isn't tall enough to enter. Then, Skipper finds a club and thinks it's perfect, but the Activities Director tells them that the club is only for teens and tweens, not for four-year-olds. They try to talk to the Activities Director, and he suggests talking to Arlene, who shows the sisters a place with pools and water slides, with a special place for birthdays.

Chelsea finds it perfect and then Arlene asks them to go ahead and make a splash. The girls keep their things on a beach chair and dive into a pool. Someone picks up Kelsie, Chelsea's plush toy elephant, and makes it get stuck in the pool's wave controls. The Activities Director blames Chelsea for the incident, but George supports her and believes she would never do that. Chelsea goes back to her room, and her sisters follow her. Chelsea hugs Kelsie, while Barbie appreciates her for taking care of her plush toy elephant so well. Chelsea goes to sleep so that her birthday comes sooner.

At midnight the cruise ship they are on crosses the International Date Line. By morning when they wake up, Chelsea jumps up and down in delight as her birthday has finally arrived. Barbie and Stacie join the pre-celebration until Skipper wakes up and checks her phone. She is shocked upon seeing the date tells them that it is the 11th while Chelsea's birthday falls on the 10th. Stacie at first thinks that she is pranking them like before until Barbie checks her phone to see it for herself. Shocked and surprised to hear the confirmation, Chelsea runs out with her plush toys to ask everyone what day it is while her older sisters chase after her, but they end up getting blocked by their cabin's entrance. Everyone says it is the 11th, and Chelsea finally admits that her birthday is lost. Then, Chelsea finds the Activities Director, who tells her that they have crossed the International Date Line. Disappointed about her birthday being lost forever, Chelsea hides under a tent and talks to her plush toys about it, but instead, a talking parrot appears and tells her about a magical gem that grants wishes hidden in a jungle island. Desperate, she leaves her plush toys and ziplines her way to the jungle island. Chelsea goes through the forest and finds a glowing waterfall and unusual but beautiful flowers. Her sisters search everywhere for her on the ship, but to no avail.

Barbie, Skipper and Stacie go to check with Arlene whether she knows of Chelsea's whereabouts. She replies negatively much to their downcast but cheers them up by encouraging them to think like Chelsea, which leads the three to assume she has gone into the nearby jungle island. Meanwhile, at that island, Chelsea starts to discover the real-life forms of her plush toys; first up, she finds a baby elephant named Kelsie crying. Chelsea asks her what is wrong and she replies that she is lost and misses her family. Chelsea tells her about the gem and the two become allies. They both find a giant talking flower who asks them a riddle. Chelsea tells Kelsie to follow the river. Meanwhile, not far off where they are, Barbie, Skipper and Stacie go to the island and take a jungle tour to find Chelsea. In the way, Chelsea and Kelsie see a giraffe named Darbie stuck in a web and about to get eaten by a spider. Chelsea cuts off the web, and the spider gets trapped in its own web. Finally, the three find a clue that says to go to the Ancient Temple of the Tiki.

Barbie says she knows a shortcut which leads them to a cliff and taps her foot on a flower. The three slide on a rainbow and reach the cliff's other side. Not far off where they are in a different part of the jungle, Barbie, Stacie and Skipper go further and deeper, with the latter falling on a bed of flowers finding them soft. She pulls Stacie to the flowers too, and the two find them really soft. Barbie, Skipper, and Stacie suddenly feel itchy. Barbie checks the internet on Skipper's phone to see which flowers they are and finds out they are itchy flowers (or poison ivies in the form of flowers). She has some oatmeal with her, so they apply it all over the itchy spots.

Chelsea, Kelsie, and Darbie reach the Ancient Temple of the Tiki and find a notice board that warns them not to wake up the Tiki

Meanwhile, Chelsea, Kelsie, Darbie, and Lacie reach the darkest, coldest and wettest place in the forest, unaware that it is the cave of a tiger named Snipper. Snipper makes some music she is afraid to share, so Chelsea tells her it is great. Snipper suspects her of telling a lie, but Chelsea really means it. They sing a song together (later known as "Make A New Day!"), and Snipper joins them on their journey. They go through the cave, a tunnel, while the tiki statue covers the entrance with a rock.

Meanwhile, Skipper and Stacie get stuck in quicksand, Barbie saves them by swinging on a vine just in time. Meanwhile, Chelsea and the animals come out the other way, but the river is full of crocodiles. The tiki statue comes again and makes the volcano erupt. Chelsea asks the animals to jump on the crocodiles' backs as if they are stepping stones. They finally reach the other way, while the tiki statue tries to stop them but flows away with the river again. Chelsea, Kelsie, Darbie, Lacie, and Snipper find the gem and read the instructions on the stone. Only one can make a wish, so they give the wish to Kelsie, for a family is the most important of all wishes. But just as Kelsie is about to quote her wish, her parents arrive there and say they will throw a party. Chelsea says Lacie can arrange games for the party, and Snipper can be the DJ. Then Chelsea asks Darbie to make the wish, but Darbie has only wanted to help. Chelsea then makes a wish and blows off the little flame on top of the gem. Her wish is to return to the ship. Barbie, Skipper and Stacie find Chelsea sleeping with her plush toys in a tent and wake her up. Unaware it has been all a dream, her sisters hug her and get her reunited with the Roberts family.

As the family is relaxing, Chelsea notices the Activities Director trying to sabotage the Lazy River again, but sneaks out and catches him in the act. It was at that moment that she realized that he was the one sabotaging the ship all along, just so he can get out of doing his job. Chelsea announces her capture to all who can hear, namely Arlene and the Captain, with the latter promoting Arlene as the new Activities Director, while the caught fake gets sent to the lower deck for his crimes. And even though Chelsea has missed her actual birthday, she still cuts the cake but denies making a wish, having made one already that reunited her with her family. Arlene remarks her action as "sweet" but asks her to blow out the candles anyway, which she does, and everyone wails in excitement. Skipper plays music with the DJ while the others dance. Chelsea even has a hand-bat handed to her and her eyes blindfolded to strike open a piñata.

== Voice cast ==
The voice cast are as follows:

- America Young as Barbie / Darbie
- Kirsten Day as Skipper / Snipper
- Cassandra Morris as Stacie / Lacie
- Cassidy Naber as Chelsea / Kelsie
- Greg Chun as George / Dad Elephant / Plant Guy / Alligator
- Lisa Fuson as Margaret / Mom Elephant
- Laila Berzins as Arlene / Parrot / Seagull
- Nakia Burrise as Captain
- Jacob Craner as Porter / Giant Flower / Ice Cream Guy / Pool Goer / Vampire
- Benjamin Pronsky as Don / Tiki Statue / Engagement Boy / Plant-Based DJ / Spider

== Broadcast ==
Aside its Netflix launch, the film aired on global children's television channels including Cartoonito (Italy), Pop (UK & Ireland), 9Go! (Australia), Neox Kids (Spain), Super RTL (Germany), Carousel (Russia) and MiniMini+ (Poland) as well as streaming service iQIYI in China.

== Soundtrack ==
Barbie & Chelsea: The Lost Birthday and More!

Soundtrack album by The Math Club
- Released: April 16, 2021
- Genre: Children's music
- Label: Mattel–Arts Music
- Producer: The Math Club

The film release was accompanied by its soundtrack album, Barbie & Chelsea: The Lost Birthday and More!, which was released on global music streaming services. Apart from its first single, "Make A New Day!", the album is made up of songs obtained from the YouTube Kids special, Barbie Dreamtopia: Festival of Fun.

All tracks are written by The Math Club.

No.	Title	Length
1.	"Make A New Day"	2:19
2.	"I Am Brave"	1:37
3.	"Keep On Looking"	1:15
4.	"Roll with It"	2:18
5.	"Patience"	0:33
Total length:		8:01

== See also ==
- List of Barbie films
