= Barbie & Teresa: Recipe for Friendship =

2025 Barbie CGI-animated television film

- Promotional artwork
- Genre: Comedy; Adventure; Children's film
- Based on: the Teresa character by Mattel
- Written by: Margaret Dunlap
- Directed by: Karen J. Lloyd (film); Peter Lee (art)
- Voices of: America Young; Tatiana Varria; Cristina Milizia; Desirae Whitfield; Nicholas Roye; Giselle Fernandez; Yeni Alvarez; Ren Hanami; Margo Rey
- Composer: Daniel Rojas

Production
- Executive producers: Christopher Keenan; Frederic Soulie
- Producer: Jeffrey R Hawley
- Running time: 60 minutes
- Production companies: Mainframe Studios; Mattel Television

Original release
- Network: Netflix
- Release: March 6, 2025

Barbie & Teresa: Recipe for Friendship is a 2025 CGI-animated adventure comedy television film directed by Karen J. Lloyd and written by Margaret Dunlap that debuted on Netflix in the United States on 6 March.

The 44th entry in the Barbie film series and the 7th to feature Barbie's family and/or friends, it centers on Barbie's in-universe Hispanic friend, Teresa, striving to re-create a cherished family tamale recipe for the launch of her cousin's tamale-themed New York City restaurant.

This film also aired on POP in the UK and Ireland, Super RTL in Germany, Austria and Switzerland, Cartoonito in Italy, Canal Panda in Portugal, Plus Plus in Ukraine and Kidzone Max in the Baltics, among other global kids channels.

== Premise ==
"The Barbie-named girls from Malibu and Brooklyn and Nikki help Teresa re-create a cherished family tamale recipe for the launch of her cousin's New York City restaurant. At the side events within New York City, "Brooklyn" Barbie helps her best friend Emmie to come up with a 'hit' theme song for the grand opening song number in/at Times Square."

== Voice cast ==
- Cristina Milizia as Teresa
- America Young as Barbie "Malibu" Roberts
- Tatiana Varria as Barbie "Brooklyn" Roberts
- Nicholas Roye as Rafa
- Yeni Alvarez as Marisol
- Giselle Fernandez as Emmie
- Ren Hanami as Director
- Margo Rey as Abuela Carmen
- Desirae Whitfield as Nikki

Other characters include Gato, Taffy, DJ and Rookie.

== Soundtrack ==
The eponymous soundtrack album was released on 30 March 2025 on global online music streaming services. It features 5 original songs written and produced by The Math Club. The principal singers featured are Jordyn Kane for Barbie "Malibu" Roberts, Lydia Li for Barbie "Brooklyn" Roberts and Yeni Alvarez in her role as Marisol.

No.	Title	Length
1.	"Friendship Goes the Distance"	2:44
2.	"Family of the Heart"	2:27
3.	"Follow Your Heart"	2:22
4.	"Inspiration Is Everywhere"	2:33
5.	"What Are Friends For"	2:24

== See also ==
- Teresa (Barbie)
- List of Barbie films
