= Barbie: A Touch of Magic =

3rd Barbie television series

- Promotional artwork
- Genre: Adventure; Friendship
- Based on: Barbie's friends and family by Mattel
- Developed by: Ann Austen
- Directed by: Scott Pleydell-Pearce (series); Gene Vassilaros (voice)
- Voices of: America Young; Tatiana Varria; Kirsten Day; Cassandra Morris; Natalie Lashkari; Ritesh Rajan; Alex Cazares; Ariana Nicole George; Gabriel "Gabe" Kunda; Mela Lee; Greg Chun; Lisa Fuson; Eamon Brennan
- Music by: The Math Club ft. DJ Brady
- Composer: The Math Club
- Country of origin: United States
- Original language: English
- No. of seasons: 2
- No. of episodes: 26

Production
- Executive producers: Christopher Keenan; Frederic Soulie
- Production location: Malibu, California
- Running time: 23 minutes
- Production company: Mattel Television

Original release
- Network: Netflix
- Release: September 1, 2023 – April 18, 2024

Barbie: A Touch of Magic is an American CGI-animated television series and the third in the Barbie media franchise after Barbie: Dreamhouse Adventures and Barbie: It Takes Two.

It made its debut in Germany on Super RTL's online video on demand service toggo.de on 1 September 2023 before the television debut on the channel itself 3 days later. It debuted on television on Pop in the United Kingdom and Ireland and Treehouse TV in Canada on the same day as in Germany, i.e. 4 September, on Gulli in France on the 6th and 9Go! in Australia on the 8th. It was released on Netflix globally on 14 September.

== Background ==
On 16 February 2023, Mattel unveiled a production slate via Google Drive accessible through this link which depicted an upcoming television show to premiere after the live-action Barbie film named Barbie: A Touch of Magic. On 24 August 2023, Mattel announced further details pertaining to its premise, composition, release dates and commentary, which later that day got picked up by news sources.

== Premise ==
Barbie from Malibu and Barbie from Brooklyn have enchanting adventures when they encounter a horse with magical powers. The horse, Peggy, needs their help with a mysterious mission. However, a wizard lizard named William, and Rocki the Glyph, want the special powers for themselves.

== Cast ==
=== Main ===
- America Young as Barbie "Malibu" Roberts and Librarian 2
- Tatiana Varria as Barbie "Brooklyn" Roberts
- Alejandra "Alex" Cazares as Rocki the Glyph
- Ritesh Rajan as Ken Carson and Tiger the Duck
- Kirsten Day as Skipper Roberts
- Cassandra Morris as Stacie Roberts
- Natalie Lashkari as Chelsea Roberts
- Greg Chun as George Roberts, father of Barbie "Malibu" Roberts
- Lisa Fuson as Margaret Roberts, mother of Barbie "Malibu" Roberts, Poppy Reardon, an antagonistic neighbor and Camper 2
- Eamon Brennan as Trevelian Finknoddle "Trey" Reardon, Poppy and Whittaker's only son
- Ariana Nicole George as Peggy

=== Recurring ===
- Cristina Milizia as Teresa and Librarian 2
- Johnny Yong Bosch as Whitaker Reardon, Poppy's husband and Trey's father, and Surfer 1
- Gabriel "Gabe" Kunda as Kelvin "Kel" Roberts, father of Barbie "Brooklyn" Roberts, and Surfer 2
- Mela Lee as Simone Roberts, mother of Barbie "Brooklyn" Roberts and Peggy's mom
- Dino Andrade as Alex, Pedestrian 1 and Pretzel Vendor

=== Guest vocals ===
- Desirae Whitfield as Nicole "Nikki" Watkins
- Stephanie Sheh as Renee
- Emma Galvin as Daisy
- Julyza Commodore as Harriet
- Kat Cressida as Dru Charles
- Dori Sacks as Elvy
- Laila Berzins as Arlene and Glyph Council Leader
- Todd Haberkorn as Will the Wizard Lizard
- Tiana Camacho as Teen Peggy
- Nicolas Roye as Rafa
- Caleb Yenn as Leo, a centaur

== Episodes ==
Season	Episodes	Originally released
1	13	September 14, 2023
2	13	April 18, 2024

=== Season 1 (2023) ===
The table below shows only the titles and episode summaries from the American Netflix release.

No. overall	No. in season	Title	Directed by	Written by	Original release date
1	1	"When Barbie Met Peggy"	Larry Anderson	Ann Austen	September 14, 2023
On a surfing trip to the beach in Malibu, California, Barbie from Malibu and Barbie from Brooklyn encounter a baby horse who is full of fun, mischief, feathers and has wish-granting magic in it! But upon bringing her ashore, they have to keep them away from Malibu Barbie's friends, family and pets as well as a glyph who wants that horse for herself. Chelsea gives the horse a new name — Peggy. On the side events, Trey falls for and develops feelings for Brooklyn Barbie.
2	2	"Finding Home"	Dominic "Dom" MacKinnon	Ann Austen	September 14, 2023
Peggy the Pegasus takes flight with Ken hot on her hooves. Later, the adventurous little horse and Brooklyn Barbie become Malibu neighbors, with the former initially doubting on leaving Malibu Barbie in Malibu and heading back to New York City until her parents had a temporary change of heart and occupy the Reardons' vacated house.
3	3	"Barbie, You Can Drive My Car"	Dominic "Dom" MacKinnon	Margaret Dunlap	September 14, 2023
Magic is in the air when Peggy helps Brooklyn Barbie learn to drive. The Glyph gets a new name so she could blend in in Malibu — Rocki — and a new job at the selfie museum as an assistant!
4	4	"Ken One and Ken Two"	Larry Anderson	Daniel Bryan Franklin	September 14, 2023
Ken causes a magical emergency when he falls on Peggy's powers to double, if not triple or quadruple, his time with the Barbies. Rocki the Glyph hatches a plan to get those powers for herself.
5	5	"Peggy-napped"	Larry Anderson	Meg Favreau	September 14, 2023
Peggy is missing! Did somebody take her? Friends and family search all over town and one of Barbie's puppies, Rookie, gets recruited by Stacie and Chelsea to put his nose on the case.
6	6	"Skate to Me, Barbie"	Dominic "Dom" MacKinnon	Story by : Amber May; Teleplay by : Daniel Bryan Franklin	September 14, 2023
The people of Malibu strap on their wheels for a skating contest. Brooklyn Barbie partners with Trey to win a trophy for her parents — no magic allowed! Right, Rocki?!
7	7	"There Might Be Dragons"	Larry Anderson	Julia Hernandez	September 14, 2023
"Malibu" Barbie plans a special event for her final night working at the water park with her friends and Skipper. Skipper has some ideas which Barbie initially rebuffs, but eventually integrates into her performance. At "Malibu" Barbie's home, her cat Blissa gets a makeover that includes scaly wings.
8	8	"A Real Page-Turner"	Dominic "Dom" MacKinnon	Tamika Cosen	September 14, 2023
The Barbies search for an author who has info about Peggy's real home. Chelsea discovers and lets out through Peggy's powers Elvy, a unicorn keeper and resident of Peggy's home, Mesmer, who first coaxes the romanticism from Ken and has it stuck in his head towards the end of the episode after she returns, much to "Malibu" Barbie's jealousy and annoyance. Chelsea and Ken follow a unicorn keeper to discover more about Peggy and who to return her home.
9	9	"A Selfie to Remember"	Larry Anderson	Johnny LaZebnik	September 14, 2023
The Barbies, Ken and Skipper all show up at the selfie museum, but Rocki casts a glyph spell to erase their memories so they can question themselves and each other.
10	10	"Tiny Problems"	Dominic "Dom" MacKinnon	Lisa Steele	September 14, 2023
The Barbies face a small challenge after making a big discovery. Meanwhile, Rocki has bad intentions when she lures Skipper and Peggy to the beach.
11	11	"Lizard Lift-Off"	Larry Anderson	Story by : Kate Moran; Teleplay by : Ann Austen	September 14, 2023
The Barbies and their crew race to the rescue after Rocki and Peggy set sail for a hidden island, where they encounter Will the Wizard Lizard.
12	12	"Careful What You Wish For"	Dominic "Dom" MacKinnon	Daniel Bryan Franklin	September 14, 2023
With her sister and friends under a spell, it's up to "Malibu" Barbie to stop Will the Wizard Lizard before he can steal an enchanted wish from Peggy.
13	13	"The Key"	Dominic "Dom" MacKinnon	Ann Austen	September 14, 2023
The key to Peggy's mission comes to light. But can she defeat the Wizard Lizard's scheme? Through the magic of friendship, anything is possible.

=== Season 2 (2024) ===
No. overall	No. in season	Title	Directed by	Written by	Original release date
14	1	"The Play's the Thing"	Dominic "Dom" MacKinnon	Chuckles Austen	April 18, 2024
A new school year begins with "Brooklyn" and Rocki joining Golden Beach High. At the same time, a mysterious new student named Leo enrolls, and a magical gem is stolen from Mesmer. Barbie and Brooklyn suspect that something strange is happening in Malibu.
15	2	"Spelling Chelsea"	Larry Anderson	Daniel Bryan Franklin	April 18, 2024
During a school field trip to a museum, a mysterious new student named Leo joins the group. Leo inspects an ancient vase artifact from the Pacific Ocean, but someone tries to steal something, leading to the cancellation of the field trip. Malibu and Brooklyn suspect that Leo attempted to steal a gem. Meanwhile, Peggy visits Ken and informs him that an air gem has been stolen from Mesmer. She believes that someone brought it to the human world to unite it with two other powerful gems. Ken borrows Elvy's staff to detect magic from the museum gem, but nothing happens. Unbeknownst to him, the magical item is actually the ancient vase in the museum. In parallel, Brooklyn and Daisy become closer while working on the school play. Chelsea, on the other hand, thinks she can use magic to win a spelling bee, but she ultimately relies on her own abilities.
16	3	"Magic in the Museum"	Dominic "Dom" MacKinnon	Daniel Bryan Franklin	April 18, 2024
When a mysterious creature called a bunnycorn tries to sabotage Simone and Kel's exhibit opening at the museum, Malibu and Brooklyn chase after him before his sneaking ends the magical night in a wreck. Meanwhile, Stacie attempts to hide from the Glyph Council when she has to come with Rocki for a presentation on how humans act.
17	4	"Hiding in Plain Sight"	Larry Anderson	Katiedid Langrock	April 18, 2024
Malibu and Brooklyn attempt to summon the bunnycorn to learn who its master is while Ned and Ted try to accomplish the same goal to prove that there's magic in Malibu for their documentary. Meanwhile, Skipper starts her own club at the dreamhouse to avoid being left out.
18	5	"Secret Victory"	Dominic "Dom" MacKinnon	Daniel Bryan Franklin	April 18, 2024
While at Dru's house in Malibu, Leo discovers a book with a figurine of a unicorn girl inside. When he pulls it out, she transforms into a real unicorn named Victory. Malibu, Brooklyn, Stacie, Chelsea, and Skipper bring Victory to the fair, where a fortune teller predicts subjects of the future.
19	6	"A Friendly Wish"	Larry Anderson	Chuck Austen	April 18, 2024
When Leo's potion to keep him from turning into a centaur runs out, he and Malibu must visit a vampire to get a refill. Meanwhile, Teresa and Brooklyn journey to Mesmer to return Victory to her three unicorn sisters, who take Teresa and Brooklyn through a set of challenges to see if they are worthy.
20	7	"Return to Pacifica Part 1"	Dominic "Dom" MacKinnon	Daniel Bryan Franklin	April 18, 2024
After Brooklyn falls into a magical whirlpool in Mesmer, she transforms into a mermaid and reunites with a mermaid friend named Talleigha, as well as meeting London, Harper, Charlie, Emily, and Coralia. Together, they try to find the water gem, which slips through a portal and disappears. Brooklyn chases after it while Malibu, Rocki, Ken, and Leo read about the legend of the centaurs and the Sapphire Fairycorn.
21	8	"Return to Pacifica Part 2"	Larry Anderson	Daniel Bryan Franklin	April 18, 2024
As Malibu jumps from portal to portal as a mermaid looking for Brooklyn, Brooklyn herself struggles to escape from Banishment Island, where Will the Wizard Lizard is trying to help her escape, secretly after the water gem that could bring him freedom.
22	9	"Baby Steps"	Dominic "Dom" MacKinnon	Chuck Austen	April 18, 2024
After a making a wish to turn her parents into babies, Skipper learns how hard it is to be a parent.
23	10	"Runaway Rocki"	Larry Anderson	Daniel Bryan Franklin	April 18, 2024
After finding out that she didn't audition for the musical fair and square, Rocki admits that she's a fraud and runs away. Meanwhile, Teresa and Malibu discover Dru's evil plot while the bunnycorns cause chaos. Is this the end of Mesmer and the school play?
24	11	"The Sapphire Fairycorn"	Dominic "Dom" MacKinnon	Ann Austen	April 18, 2024
All the gang has to do is stop one evil author. Easy, right? Wrong. Not so easy when half of the crew is stuck in a different dimension with the banished centaurs. In a desperate measure, Alo calls out to the Sapphire Fairycorn for help, who will only intervene if the centaurs can find the gift in their dimension.
25	12	"The Ultimate Wish"	Larry Anderson	Daniel Bryan Franklin	April 18, 2024
As Dru takes all the magic for herself, the gang must one last time journey to Mesmer to help before the world loses all of its magic. Unfortunately, Dru picks up on Malibu, Brooklyn, Ken, and Rocki's plan and puts an end to Mesmer's magic, taking it all for herself.
26	13	"Barbie, Take a Bow"	Dominic "Dom" MacKinnon	Ann & Chuck Austen	April 18, 2024
Everyone take a seat for Golden Beach High's new musical. After Rocki quits, Brooklyn steps up to play Rocki's part. But after Leo has to leave early to lead his people back to Mesmer, the show slowly starts to crumble apart. Meanwhile, Rocki learns that if she doesn't return to Mesmer, she will turn into a human forever. The show must go on... But will it?
