= Barbie: Mermaid Power =

2022 Barbie television film

- Promotional artwork
- Genre: Musical; Adventure; Friendship; Comedy
- Based on: Barbie's sisters by Mattel; The Barbie "Brooklyn" Roberts character from Barbie: Big City, Big Dreams and the "Isla" and "Marlo" characters from Barbie Dolphin Magic by Mattel Television
- Written by: Ann Austen
- Directed by: Emory Ronald "Ron" Myrick (film); Gene Vassilaris (casting and voice)
- Voices of: America Young; Tatiana Varria; Kirsten Day; Cassandra Lee Morris; Cassidy Naber; Madelyn Kratzer; Melanie Minichino; Johnny Yong Bosch; Vivian Lu; Natalie Lashkari; Tiana Camacho
- Music by: Matthew Tishler; Andrew Underberg
- Countries of origin: United States; Canada
- Original language: English

Production
- Executive producers: Christopher Keenan; Frederic Soulie
- Producer: Susan Corbin
- Running time: 65 minutes
- Production companies: Mattel Television; Mainframe Studios

Original release
- Network: 9Go! (Australia); Netflix (United States); YTV (Canada)
- Release: 17 July 2022

Barbie: Mermaid Power or Barbie Mermaid Power is a 2022 CGI-animated musical adventure comedy children's television film directed by Emory Ronald "Ron" Myrick and written by Ann Austen.

The 40th entry in the Barbie film series, it debuted in Australia on 9Go! on 17 August 2022 before its release in the United States and globally on Netflix a fortnight later alongside an accompanying soundtrack album. The film also had theatrical releases in the British Isles and Europe throughout October and November.

== Background ==
The title and the promotional artwork for the film was revealed by former Mattel president, Richard L. Dickson, while putting out a presentation for analysts and the company's board of directors on 18 February 2022, which also hinted at a possible future film entry: "Barbie: Epic Road Trip".

== Plot ==
In an underwater kingdom named Pacifica, 8 mer-persons are chosen by a beam of light from a giant golden pearl to be its guardians. With only 6 of them present, Isla (returning from Barbie Dolphin Magic) gasped and murmured to herself as she quietly swam out to find the remaining 2, which would turn out to be the "Malibu" Barbie and "Brooklyn" Barbie. Using the pearl necklace Isla gave to her during Dolphin Magic, the Barbie-girls and "Malibu" Barbie's sisters; Skipper, Stacie and Chelsea, transform into mermaids, with Skipper and Stacie getting their first experience of mermaid life and Chelsea, her second after own series-turned-franchise, Barbie Dreamtopia. "Brooklyn" Barbie begins to learn that the myth surrounding mermaids is true.

At a science academy, Marlo (also returning from Dolphin Magic) tried but failed miserably to convince its attendants to buy into her proof of worth that the myth surrounding mermaids is true with some verbally doubting her credentials and their leader, Dr. Amy Tang, going on to verbally revoke her institution's funding to Marlo to further her "frivolous fairy-tale witch-hunt" research as she put it. Marlo was hyper-focused on it whether she would receive funding on it or not and had listed her right-hand assistant, Oslo, to achieve this.

Upon meeting Isla, she explained why she called them and she replied that they were going to get powers and meet the leader of Pacifica named Coralia, but they would later face 3 initially antagonistic pretenders for the title-earner of "Power Keeper"; Talluyah, Sareena and Finn, the latter whose sister, Aquaryah, would have swathes of adventures with Chelsea at certain periods of the film. With Marlo having 2 purple torch-oriented fish-like carnivore creatures, she would have hold of Chelsea and Aquaryah via a fishing net. The girls would later escape through Chelsea understanding the real motive of the creatures. "Malibu" Barbie would later reunite with Marlo, but a submarine crash and an unexpected trouble for Barbie would force her to seek help from Marlo, which she would grant. Barbie would finally have her water powers at last after seeing others and her own sisters have their own powers prior. The rest of the mermaids used their obtained powers to clear off an on-coming raging mountain island of trash and filth threatening to harm not only Pacifica but the entirety of aquatic life. With Aquaryah and Chelsea reuniting with the Pacifica folk, "Malibu" Barbie declared the former as the "Power Keeper", citing her bravery, kindness and care as what she felt had the qualities and capacities for that title. She ordered both herself and the power tenders to aim their powers at Aquaryah, who channeled her initially weak powers to nullify and vanquish the trash island into white sprinkles. They later celebrate the preservation of aquatic life and pose for a final film shot.

== Voice cast ==
As per the end/closing credits: (Note: Mattel mixed up the voice credits for "Chelsea" and "Sareena Seasquid" in the film's/movie's end credits as Cassidy Naber provided the voice for "Chelsea" since Barbie Dreamhouse Adventures and not Natalie Lashkari who actually provides the voice for "Sareena".)

- America Young as Barbie "Malibu" Roberts
- Tatiana Varria as Barbie "Brooklyn" Roberts
- Kirsten Day as Skipper
- Cassandra Lee Morris as Stacie & Mermaid 1
- Natalie Lashkari as Chelsea
- Madelyn Kratzer as Aquaryah Aquavilla
- Vivian Lu as Isla & Dr. Tang
- Johnny Yong Bosch as Finn & Waiter
- Tiana Camacho as Talleigha Fishtail
- Angela Lee Sloan as Coralia & Angler Fish
- Melanie Minicino as Marlo & Mermaid 2
- Cassidy Naber as Sareena Seasquid
- Jabez Zuniga as Oslo

== Release ==
Aside its premiere on Netflix and Australian television, the film is/was also shown in movie theaters across Europe and the Middle East including the UK & Ireland via Showcase Cinemas, Saudi Arabia via VOX Cinemas, Germany via Cineplex and other countries via Vue Cinemas. Like previous Barbie film entries, novelizations based on the film were released as well.

== Soundtrack ==
The eponymous soundtrack album was released on 15 August 2022 on global online music streaming services. The album features 5 original songs written by Matthew Tishler and Andrew Underberg with two of them additionally written by Matias Mora and produced by The Math Club. The principal singers featured are Jordyn Kane for Barbie "Malibu" Roberts Lydia Li for Barbie "Brooklyn" Roberts.

No.	Title	Length
1.	"Make It Happen"	2:04
2.	"Beneath the Surface"	2:21
3.	"Turn It Up"	2:36
4.	"Rise Above It"	1:55
5.	"Find Your Power"	2:30

== See also ==
- List of Barbie films
