= Lisa Fuson =

American actress

- Born: Lisa Fuson; October 25, 1963 (age 62); Los Angeles, California, United States
- Occupation: Actress
- Years active: 1989–present
- Website: lisafuson.com

Lisa Fuson (born October 25, 1963, in Los Angeles) is a voice actress who has played several roles in Star Wars video games.

Her roles were mainly Princess Leia and Vana Sage, but she also acted in the Nickelodeon cartoon series, Hey Arnold!, in several minor roles.

In 2018, Fuson voiced Barbie's mom, Margaret, on the series Barbie Dreamhouse Adventures, and Barbie: It Takes Two. Outside of voice acting, Lisa Fuson has acted on L.A. Vice.

== Filmography ==
Year	Film	Role	Notes
1989	L.A. Vice	Hostage	
1994	Score with Chicks		
1996	Star Wars: Shadows of the Empire	Leia Organa/Guri	video game voice
1996–2000	Hey Arnold!	Woman At Movie; Miss Slovak; Danny's Mother/Kid; Lorraine/Debate Moderator	4 episodes voice
1998	Star Wars: Rebellion	Princess Leia	voice
1998	Star Wars: Masters of Teräs Käsi	Leia Organa	video game voice
2001	Star Wars: Galactic Battlegrounds	Leia Organa/Rebel grenade trooper	video game voice
2001	Star Wars: Starfighter	Vana Sage	video game voice
2002	Star Wars: Jedi Starfighter	Vana Sage	video game voice
2008	Jumper: Griffin's Story		video game voice
2012	Lego Star Wars: The Empire Strikes Out	Leia Organa	voice
2018–2020	Barbie Dreamhouse Adventures	Margaret Roberts, Poppy Reardon, Teresa's Phone	voice
2020	Maneater	Female Hunter	voice
2020	Barbie: Princess Adventure	Margaret	voice
2021	Barbie & Chelsea: The Lost Birthday	Margaret, Elephant Mom	voice
2022	Barbie: It Takes Two	Margaret Roberts	voice
2023	Barbie: A Touch of Magic	Margaret Roberts, Poppy Reardon	voice
2025	Barbie Project Friendship	Margaret	video game voice
