= Barbie Dreamtopia =

Web-based Barbie media franchise

- Created by: Julia Pistor
- Original work: Barbie Dreamtopia shorts
- Owner: Mattel Television
- Years: 2016 – 2021

Films and television
- Web series: Barbie Dreamtopia shorts; Barbie Dreamtopia: The Series; Barbie: Return to Dreamtopia (part of Barbie's Dreamworld)
- Television special: Barbie Dreamtopia TV special
- Television film: Barbie Dreamtopia: Festival of Fun

Barbie Dreamtopia, Barbie: Dreamtopia or simply Dreamtopia, (stylized as Barbie DREAMTOPIA) is a web-based children's media franchise created by Julia Pistor for Mattel Television which was active from 14 January 2016 to 21 October 2021.

Dreamtopia was originally produced by Israeli animation studio Snowball Studios with support from The Jerusalem Film & Television Fund. from 14 January 2016 to 1 April 2018. Toronto-based Relish Studios produced an 8-part mini-serial spin-off of the franchise titled Barbie: Return to Dreamtopia as an part of a broader animated web franchise known as Barbie's Dreamworld which was released by Mattel Television on YouTube Kids and YouTube, the latter via its Barbie user handle, between 21 July and 21 October 2021.

== Premise ==
The series follows Chelsea Roberts as she finds herself touring her own make-believe land known as Dreamtopia with her big sister, Barbie. There, they discover a whole new munch-able world; swim through rainbow rivers with small mermaids and fly through cotton candy clouds with fairies.

== Broadcast ==
Dreamtopia began with the release of a teaser promo video on 14 January 2016. The shorts then followed from 5 May to 21 July 2016 and was initially released as a YouTube Kids-exclusive production, but was later made available on YouTube. An animated television special spanning 46 minutes in length was distributed by Universal Pictures Home Entertainment and broadcast on television in 5 countries and regions on 26 June 2016. The success of the TV special resulted in the greenlighting of an eponymous web series, with four episodes released early on YouTube and YouTube Kids on 4 May 2017. The web series episodes began to be released weekly on YouTube and YouTube Kids from 5 November 2017 to 1 April 2018. Barbie Dreamtopia: The Series debuted on Cartoon Network in Australia and New Zealand on 2 March 2018. The series also debuted on Kabillion and KidsClick in the United States on 7 September and 24 September 2018, respectively.

== Main characters ==
- Chelsea (voiced by Meira Bilnkoff): Barbie's little sister and the focus of the franchise.
- Barbie (voiced by Erica Lindbeck): Chelsea's older sister.
- Honey (voiced by Lucien Dodge): Chelsea's puppy.
- Otto / Notto Prince (voiced by Addie Chandler) is Chelsea's neighbor. In Dreamtopia, his character is Notto Prince.

== Shorts ==
The Barbie: Dreamtopia franchise overall was centered on a series of animated shorts released exclusively on YouTube between 5 May and 21 July 2016.

No.	Title	Runtime	Release date	Ref
S1	"Wispy Forest Part 1"	3:43	May 4, 2016	
When Chelsea is frustrated that her hair won’t cooperate before the Pink Moon Jubilee, a festival when your hair can be anything you want it to be, her hair takes on a mind of its own and runs away.
S2	"Wispy Forest Part 2"	3:10	May 13, 2016	
Chelsea and Barbie chase her escaped hair creature through the Fair Hair Forest, discovering it in the hands (or on the head) of the Notto Prince. With the help of Barbie, Chelsea and her hair creature work out their differences, finally reuniting just in time to enjoy the Pink Moon Jubilee.
S3	"Rainbow Cove Part 1"	3:55	May 18, 2016	
Barbie, the Rainbow Princess, loses a magic stone that provides all of the color to Rainbow World. Worried that she won’t be able to recover the stone before her crowning ceremony, Chelsea and Honey help her look, as they race along the rainbow ramps against the Notto Prince, who wants the stone for himself.
S4	"Rainbow Cove Part 2"	2:59	May 25, 2016	
After the magic stone goes sliding down a rainbow, Chelsea and the Notto Prince race to retrieve it. With the help of Barbie and the other Rainbow Princesses, Chelsea retrieves the stone just in time for Barbie's ceremony.
S5	"Sweetville Part 1"	2:44	June 29, 2016	
When the bridge over the lemonade river is destroyed, the creatures of Sweetville are worried that they won’t make it across the river for the Innovation Celebration being held at the Lollipop Gardens. The townspeople work together using the unsuccessful ideas of the mysterious Captain Snickerdoodle, revealed to be the Notto Prince, who destroyed the bridge on purpose.
S6	"Sweetville Part 2"	2:53	July 6, 2016	
The Notto Prince reveals that he destroyed the bridge because he was afraid everyone would laugh at his ideas. Inspired by Notto and Chelsea, Barbie has an idea and they work together to build a giant cupcake trampoline so they can bounce across the river.
S7	"Sparkle Mountain Part 1"	2:19	July 15, 2016	
On a class scavenger hunt for magic jewels, Chelsea and Apprentice Queen Barbie engage in a race against the Notto Prince and the Elephant King who want the jewels for themselves.
S8	"Sparkle Mountain Part 2"	2:47	July 21, 2016	
In the final stretch, with one jewel to go, Barbie and Chelsea abandon their search for jewels to help a kitten in need. When they clean him up, they find that the kitten wears a collar adorned in jewels, and by helping someone in need instead of looking for jewels, Barbie passes her test. -->

== Television film ==
An eponymous television film spanning 46 minutes in length was released on 26 June 2016 by Universal Pictures Home Entertainment and broadcast on television in 5 countries and territories including Cartoon Network in Latin America, Super RTL in Germany, Pop in the UK and Ireland, MiniMini+ in Poland, Karusel in Russia and Media Prima in Malaysia.

No.	Title	Runtime	Release date
M1	"Barbie: Dreamtopia"	46 minutes	June 26, 2016

== Barbie Dreamtopia: Festival of Fun ==
The web-based special, Festival of Fun, was released on 4 May 2017 on YouTube and its affiliate mobile app. It is a compilation of the first four episodes of Dreamtopia: The Series ahead of its official debut in November.

No.	Title	Runtime	Release date	Refs
M2	"Barbie Dreamtopia: Festival of Fun"	39:08	May 4, 2017	

== The series ==
During MIPCOM 2016, Mattel Creations announced the greenlighting of an eponymous web series and afterwards on YouTube via its Barbie user handle on 12 October 2016, citing the success of the television film special released on 26 June as the reason. It is, like the franchise overall, created by Julia Pistor with assistance from Saul Blinkoff and majority-directed by Eran Lazar. This web series, like the earlier web shorts, was first released on YouTube Kids and to YouTube itself afterwards from 5 November 2017 to 1 April 2018.

The series debuted on American television via children's programming block KidsClick from Sinclair Broadcast Group on 24 September 2018 and on South African television via eToonz on 25 March 2019.

No.	Title	Directed by	Written by	Runtime	Release date (YouTube general)	Ref
1	"Building a Licorice Barn: A story about Patience (Sweetville)"	Eran Lazar	Kate Boutilier	9:06	May 25, 2017	
2	"The Supersonic Sparkling Lemonator: A story about Teamwork (Sweetville)"	Eran Lazar	David Rosenberg	9:25	May 24, 2017	
3	"The Gemonstrator: A story about Discovery (Sparkle Mountain)"	Eran Lazar	Joan Considine Johnson	10:03	May 27, 2017	
4	"Keep On Looking 'til You Find It: A story about Not giving up (Sparkle Mountain)"	Eran Lazar	Unknown	9:00	May 26, 2017	
5	"The Sweetest Journey: a story about Patience"	Eran Lazar	Joan Considine Johnson	10:21	November 6, 2017	
6	"A Mopple Mishap: a story about Communication (Wispy Forest)"	Eran Lazar	David Rosenberg	10:23	November 12, 2017	
7	"A Staticky Situation: a story about Being Flexible (Wispy Forest)"	Eran Lazar	Donna Logan	10:24	November 19, 2017	
8	"The Lost Treasure of the Prism Princess: a story about Teamwork (Rainbow Cove)"	Eran Lazar	Kate Boutilier	10:25	November 26, 2017	
9	"Four Times the Chelsea: a story about Different Points Of View (Sparkle Mountain)"	Eran Lazar	David Rosenberg	10:23	December 2, 2017	
10	"The Wispy Forest Hairathalon: a story about Listening (Wispy Forest)"	Eran Lazar	Joan Considine Johnson	10:22	December 10, 2017	
11	"A Winning Color Combination: a story about Forgiveness (Rainbow Cove)"	Eran Lazar	David Rosenberg	10:21	December 17, 2017	
12	"The Damaged Spellbook: a story about Respecting Other People's Things (Sparkle Mountain)"	Eran Lazar	Kate Boutilier	10:27	December 24, 2017	
13	"Concert in the Clouds: a story about Confidence (Rainbow Cove)"	Eran Lazar	Alicyn Packard and Dana Middleton	10:26	December 30, 2017	
14	"Forest Full of Friendship: a story about Friendship (Wispy Forest)"	–	–	10:10	January 8, 2018	
After receiving a friendship bracelet from Zoie, Chelsea goes to Dreamtopia to share the idea with her friends there.
15	"Bearable Barry: a story about Being Different (Sweetville)"	Eran Lazar	David Rosenberg	10:21	January 13, 2018	
16	"Glitter Ball Trouble: a story about Responsibility (Sparkle Mountain)"	Eran Lazar	Kate Boutilier	10:20	January 21, 2018	
17	"Unicorn in the Cloud: a story about Imagination (Rainbow Cove)"	Eran Lazar	Ann Austen	10:28	January 28, 2018	
18	"Sailing on a String: a story about Kindness (Rainbow Cove)"	Eran Lazar	Joan Cosidine Johnson	10:13	February 3, 2018	
19	"Rainbow Cove Games: a story about Fair Play (Rainbow Cove)"	Eran Lazar	David Rosenberg	10:32	February 11, 2018	
20	"The Magic Seeds: a story about Working Together (Sweetville)"	Eran Lazar	Alicyn Packard and David Middleton	10:26	February 18, 2018	
21	"A Sound in Sweetville: a story about Being Brave (Sweetville)"	Eran Lazar	Joan Cosidine Johnson	10:15	February 25, 2018	
22	"It's Not Easy Being Clean: a story about Responsibility (Sparkle Mountain)"	Eran Lazar	David Rosenberg	10:10	March 4, 2018	
23	"Magical Gifts of the Forest: a story about Thoughtfulness (Wispy Forest)"	Eran Lazar	Alicyn Packard and David Middleton	10:23	March 12, 2018	
24	"The Sweetville Parade: a story about Overcoming Obstacles"	Eran Lazar	Joan Cosidine Johnson	9:57	March 17, 2018	
25	"Fancy Cheese Fiasco: a story about Honesty (Sweetville)"	Eran Lazar	Alicyn Packard and David Middleton	10:36	March 25, 2018	
26	"The Tumblin' Tangleweed: a story about Being Tidy (Wispy Forest)"	Eran Lazar	Alicyn Packard and David Middleton	10:13	April 1, 2018	

=== Books ===
- Saxon, Victoria; Pickens, Charles; Moss, Patrick Ian (2017). Barbie Dreamtopia: Storybook and Cell Phone Projector (Movie Theater) Hardcover. Studio Fun International. ISBN 9780794440800.
- Saxon, Victoria; Pickens, Charles; Moss, Patrick Ian (2017). Barbie Dreamtopia. Big Golden Books. Mattel. ISBN 9781524701178.
- Barbie Dreamtopia: Kocham ten film (in Polish). Egmont. 2018. ISBN 9788328124486.
- Barbie Dreamtopia: Hayaller Ülkesi Harika Boyama Kitabı (in Turkish). 2017. ISBN 9786050944808.
- Man-Kong, Mary (2017). Barbie Dreamtopia: The Best Birthday. Step into Reading. Random House Books for Young Readers. ISBN 9781524716387.
- Barbie Dreamtopia: The Birthday Wish. Pictureback. Random House. 2017. ISBN 9781524716462.
- Barbie Dreamtopia: Invisible Notes. Scholastic Australia. ISBN 9781742762555.
- Barbie Dreamtopia: Pinta y Pega (in Spanish). Fleurus panini. ISBN 9788427870475.
- Pimenova, Tatiana (2017). Barbie Dreamtopia: Наклей и раскрась (in Russian). ISBN 9785447129446.
- Barbie Dreamtopia: Stick Stack (in Spanish). Fleurus panini. ISBN 9788427870468.
- Tillworth, Mary (2019). Barbie Dreamtopia: The Most Precious Gem. Random House Childrens Books. ISBN 9781524719609.

=== Video games ===
Note: These were individually listed on the Barbie.com website during its run and were all discontinued in 2022.

- Magical Hair
- Coloring Creations Game
- Sparkle Mountain Ride
- Rainbow Cove Cloud Creations
- Wispy Forest Spot The Difference
- Sweetville Sugar Match
- Dreamtopia Adventure Games
