= Barbie (film) =

2023 film by Greta Gerwig

- Theatrical release poster
- Directed by: Greta Gerwig
- Written by: Greta Gerwig; Noah Baumbach
- Based on: Barbie by: Mattel; Ruth Handler
- Produced by: David Heyman; Margot Robbie; Tom Ackerley; Robbie Brenner
- Starring: Margot Robbie; Ryan Gosling; America Ferrera; Kate McKinnon; Issa Rae; Rhea Perlman; Will Ferrell
- Cinematography: Rodrigo Prieto
- Edited by: Nick Houy
- Music by: Mark Ronson; Andrew Wyatt
- Production companies: Mattel Films; Heyday Films; LuckyChap Entertainment; NB/GG Pictures
- Distributed by: Warner Bros. Pictures
- Release dates: July 9, 2023 (Shrine Auditorium); July 21, 2023 (United States and United Kingdom)
- Running time: 114 minutes
- Countries: United States; United Kingdom
- Language: English
- Budget: $128–145 million
- Box office: $1.448 billion

Barbie (Note: Also known in promotional material as Barbie the Movie) is a 2023 satirical fantasy comedy film directed by Greta Gerwig from a screenplay she wrote with her husband, Noah Baumbach. Based on the fashion dolls by Mattel, it is the first live-action Barbie film after numerous animated films and specials. Starring Margot Robbie as the title character and Ryan Gosling as Ken, the film follows them on a journey of self-discovery through Barbieland and the real world following an existential crisis. The supporting cast includes America Ferrera, Michael Cera, Kate McKinnon, Issa Rae, Rhea Perlman, and Will Ferrell.

A live-action Barbie film was announced in September 2009 by Universal Pictures with Laurence Mark producing. Development began in April 2014, when Sony Pictures acquired the film rights. Following multiple writer and director changes and the casting of Amy Schumer and later Anne Hathaway as Barbie, the rights were transferred to Warner Bros. Pictures in October 2018. Robbie was cast in 2019, and Gerwig was announced as director and co-writer with Baumbach in 2020. The rest of the cast was announced in early 2022. Principal photography occurred primarily at Warner Bros. Studios Leavesden, England, and at the Venice Beach Skatepark in Los Angeles from March to July 2022.

Barbie premiered at the Shrine Auditorium in Los Angeles on July 9, 2023, and was released in the United States on July 21. Its concurrent release with Universal Pictures' Oppenheimer was the catalyst of the "Barbenheimer" phenomenon, encouraging audiences to see both films as a double feature. The film grossed $1.448 billion and achieved several milestones, becoming Warner Bros.' highest-grossing film, the highest-grossing film of 2023 and the 14th highest-grossing film of all time at the time of its release.

Named one of the top ten films of 2023 by the National Board of Review and the American Film Institute, Barbie received widespread critical acclaim and other accolades, including eight Academy Award nominations (among them Best Picture), winning Best Original Song for "What Was I Made For?" by Billie Eilish; the song also won the Golden Globe Award for Best Original Song while the film received the inaugural Golden Globe Award for Cinematic and Box Office Achievement.

== Plot ==
A "stereotypical" Barbie resides with many different versions of herself in Barbieland, a matriarchal society created by the collective human imagination, along with Kens and a group of discontinued models treated like outcasts due to their unconventional traits. While the Kens spend their days playing at the beach, considering it their profession, the Barbies hold prestigious jobs in law, science, politics, media, and so on. Ken ("Beach Ken") is only happy when he is with Barbie, and he seeks a closer relationship with her, but she rebuffs him in favor of other activities and female friendships.

One evening at a dance party, Barbie is suddenly stricken with worries about mortality. Overnight, she develops bad breath, cellulite, and flat feet, disrupting her routines and impairing the aura of classic perfection experienced by the Barbies. Weird Barbie, a disfigured doll, tells Barbie to find the child playing with her in the real world to cure her afflictions. Barbie travels to the real world, with Beach Ken joining her by stowing away in her convertible.

After arriving in Venice Beach, Barbie punches a man for groping her, and is briefly arrested. She and Ken are then both arrested after not paying for new clothes. Alarmed by the dolls' presence in the real world and remembering the "Skipper incident", the CEO of Mattel orders their recapture. Barbie tracks down her owner, a teenage girl named Sasha, who criticizes Barbie for encouraging unrealistic beauty standards. Distraught, Barbie discovers that Gloria, a Mattel employee and Sasha's mother, inadvertently caused Barbie's existential crisis after starting to play with Sasha's old Barbie dolls and drawing Barbies with dark emotions and thoughts. Mattel finds Barbie and attempts to put her in a toy box for remanufacturing, but a mysterious elderly woman named Ruth helps her escape. Gloria and Sasha arrive just in time to rescue Barbie from Mattel's executives, and the three travel to Barbieland with the executives in pursuit.

Meanwhile, Ken learns about patriarchy and feels respected for the first time. He returns to Barbieland to persuade the other Kens to take it over. The Kens begin to indoctrinate the Barbies into submissive roles, such as agreeable girlfriends, housewives, and maids. Barbie arrives and attempts to convince the Barbies to be independent again, but becomes depressed when she fails. Gloria expresses her frustration with the conflicting standards that real-world women are expected to follow, and her speech restores Barbie's confidence.

Aided by Sasha, Weird Barbie, Allan, Writer Barbie, and the discontinued dolls, Gloria uses her knowledge from the real world to deprogram the Barbies from their indoctrination. The Barbies then manipulate the Kens into fighting among themselves, which distracts them from enshrining male superiority into Barbieland's constitution, allowing the Barbies to regain power. Having now experienced systemic oppression for themselves, the Barbies resolve to rectify the faults of their previous society, emphasizing better treatment of the Kens and all outcasts. Barbie and Ken make amends, acknowledging their past mistakes. When Ken bemoans his lack of purpose without Barbie, she encourages him to find an autonomous identity. Barbie, who remains unsure of her own identity, meets with the ghost of Ruth Handler, Mattel co-founder and creator of the Barbie doll, who explains that Barbie's story has no set ending and her ever-evolving history surpasses her roots.

After bidding goodbye to the other dolls and Mattel executives, Barbie decides to become human again and return to the real world. Sometime later, Gloria, her husband, and Sasha take Barbie, now going by the name "Barbara Handler", to her first gynecologist appointment.

== Cast ==
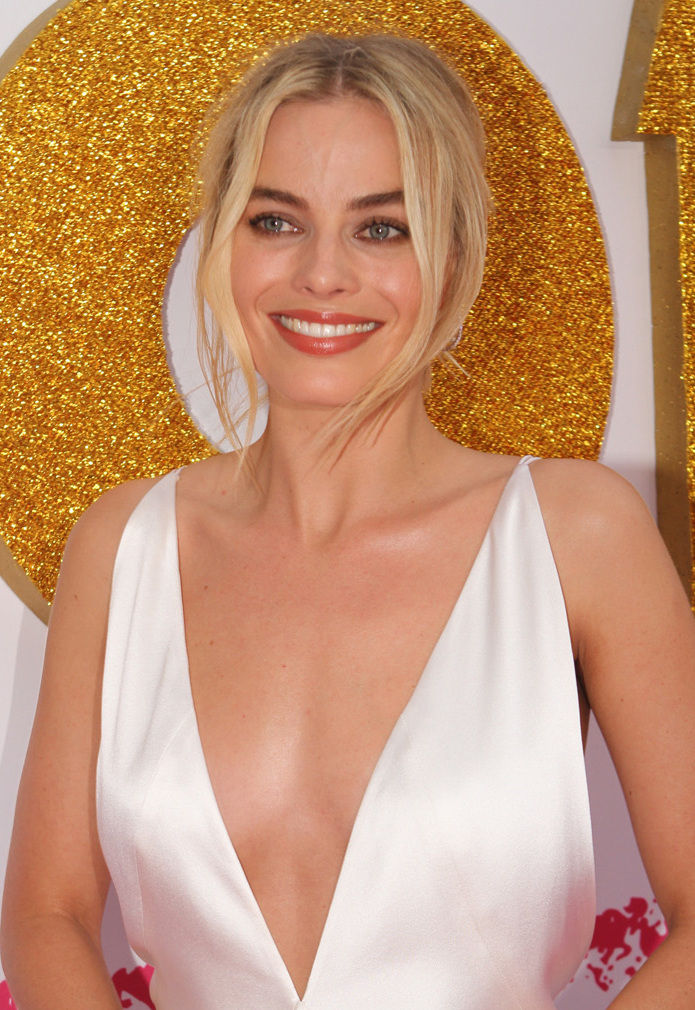
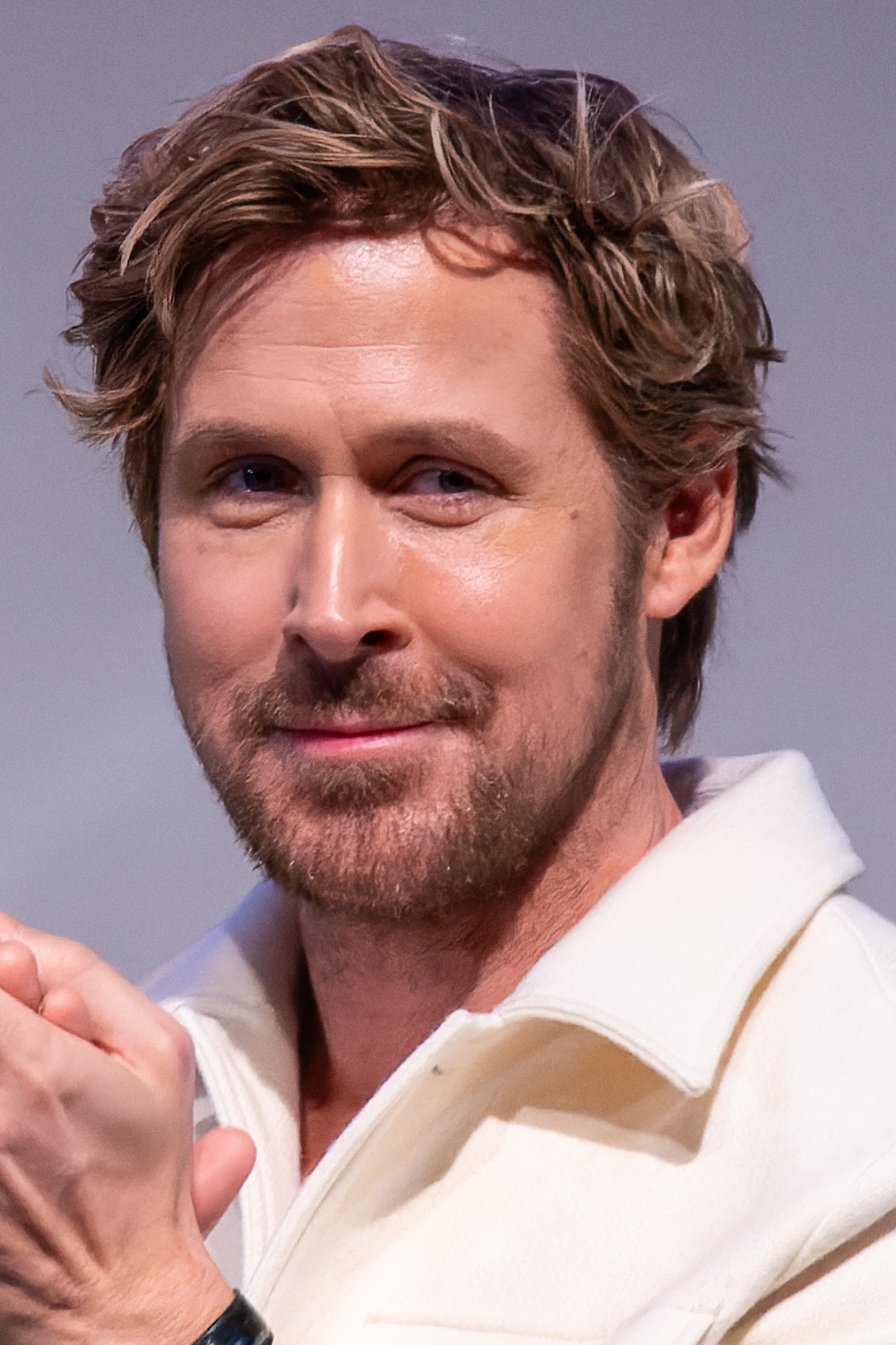
Margot Robbie (left) and Ryan Gosling (right) respectively portray Barbie and Ken.
The Barbies are credited under this grouping as "Barbie":
- Margot Robbie as Barbie, a doll who is often referred to as "Stereotypical Barbie", and as Barbara Handler, the name she adopts after becoming human, named after the daughter of Mattel founder Ruth Handler
- Issa Rae as President Barbie, the President of Barbieland
- Kate McKinnon as Weird Barbie, the outcast Barbie who has been exuberantly played with – shown as having had her hair cut and face colored on with markers by a child – and who lives in the Weird House and has knowledge of the lands outside of Barbieland
- Alexandra Shipp as Writer Barbie
- Emma Mackey as Physicist Barbie
- Hari Nef as Dr. Barbie
- Sharon Rooney as Lawyer Barbie
- Ana Cruz Kayne as Judge Barbie
- Ritu Arya as Journalist Barbie
- Dua Lipa as Mermaid Barbie
- Nicola Coughlan as Diplomat Barbie

The Kens are credited under this grouping as "Ken":

- Ryan Gosling as Ken, a friend of "Stereotypical Barbie" who is often referred to as "Beach Ken"
- Simu Liu as Rival Ken
- Kingsley Ben-Adir as Basketball Ken
- Ncuti Gatwa as Artist Ken
- Scott Evans as Stereotypical Ken
- John Cena as Kenmaid, a merman Ken

The rest of the cast are listed below:

- America Ferrera as Gloria, a Mattel employee who helps Barbie in the real world
- Ariana Greenblatt as Sasha, Gloria's daughter
  - Genvieve Toussaint as young Sasha
- Rhea Perlman as Ruth Handler, a co-founder of Mattel whose ghost has an office on Mattel's 17th floor
- Helen Mirren as the voice of the narrator (Note: Despite a poster of Helen Mirren being made, she does not appear on screen in the film.)
- Will Ferrell as the unnamed CEO of Mattel
- Michael Cera as Allan, a Barbieland inhabitant of whom there is "only one"
- Connor Swindells as Aaron Dinkins, a low-level Mattel employee who informs the CEO of Barbie's appearance in Los Angeles
- Jamie Demetriou as the unnamed CFO of Mattel
- Emerald Fennell as Midge, a pregnant doll in Barbieland who lives near Stereotypical Barbie despite being discontinued
- Asim Chaudhry as a Mattel warehouse employee
- Ray Fearon as Dan at the FBI, a contact of the CEO of Mattel
- Erica Ford as Skipper, one of Barbie's neighbors who once showed up in Malibu to babysit a family's children according to the CEO
- Hannah Khalique-Brown as "Growing Up" Skipper, one of the discontinued dolls who lives with Weird Barbie whose "growing up" feature that involves growing breasts when her arm is pushed remains intact
- Mette Narrative as Barbie Video Girl, a doll with a TV on her back who is among the discontinued dolls living with Weird Barbie
- Marisa Abela as Teen Talk Barbie, a teen-talking doll who is among the discontinued dolls living with Weird Barbie
- Lucy Boynton as Proust Barbie, one of the discontinued dolls who lives with Weird Barbie that was seen in the background when Gloria, Sasha, and Allan arrive at Weird Barbie's "weird house". Boynton was meant to have more scenes, but test audiences' unfamiliarity with Marcel Proust, and thus inability to appreciate the humor associated with the Proust Barbie character, meant that she only appears in a brief cameo in the finished film.
- Rob Brydon as Sugar Daddy Ken, one of the discontinued dolls who lives with Weird Barbie. To clear up his name to Sasha when she quoted "sugar daddy", he states that his toy puppy is named Sugar and that he is Sugar's father, as Mattel did when faced with controversy.
- Tom Stourton as Earring Magic Ken, one of the discontinued dolls who lives with Weird Barbie and wears a magic earring
- Ann Roth as the woman on the bench
- Annie Mumolo as Anxiety Mom
- Lauren Holt as Time Mom
- Ryan Piers Williams as Gloria's husband (Note: The unnamed husband of Gloria is credited as "El Esposo de Gloria" (Spanish for "Gloria's husband".))

Tanner, a discontinued toy dog known for his defecating feature, makes a non-speaking appearance as one of the discontinued characters living with Weird Barbie.

== Production ==
=== Development ===
The concept of a live-action Barbie film was in development at Cannon Films in the mid-1980s. Renewed development on a film based on the Barbie toy line began in September 2009, when it was announced that Mattel had signed a partnership with Universal Pictures and producer Laurence Mark, but nothing came to fruition. In April 2014, Mattel teamed with Sony Pictures to produce the film, which would have Jenny Bicks writing the screenplay and Laurie MacDonald and Walter F. Parkes producing through their Parkes+MacDonald Image Nation banner. Filming was anticipated to begin by the end of the year. In March 2015, Diablo Cody was brought onto the project to rewrite the screenplay, and Amy Pascal joined the producing team. Sony ordered further rewrites by Lindsey Beer, Bert V. Royal, and Hillary Winston, who submitted separate drafts.

In December 2016, Amy Schumer entered negotiations for the title role with Winston's screenplay. She helped rewrite the script with her sister, Kim Caramele. In March 2017, she exited negotiations, initially saying it was due to scheduling conflicts with the planned June 2017 filming; she revealed in 2023 that she left due to creative differences with the film's producers. That July, Anne Hathaway was considered for the title role; Sony hired Olivia Milch to rewrite the screenplay and approached Alethea Jones to direct as a means of interesting Hathaway in signing. Jones was attached to direct by March 2018.

In August 2018, Mattel CEO Ynon Kreiz hired film executive Robbie Brenner, who was later appointed head of Mattel Films. Sony's option on the project expired in October 2018, and film rights were transferred to Warner Bros. Pictures, causing Hathaway, Jones, MacDonald, Parkes, and Pascal to leave the project. Margot Robbie entered early talks for the role, and Patty Jenkins was briefly considered as director. Kreiz was determined to cast Robbie after meeting with her; both he and Brenner felt that Robbie's appearance resembled that of a conventional Barbie doll and were impressed by her ideas. Initial meetings occurred at the Polo Lounge located in The Beverly Hills Hotel. Brenner eventually partnered with Robbie's production company, LuckyChap Entertainment, and Robbie's husband Tom Ackerley and Josey McNamara were enlisted as producers. Robbie's casting was confirmed in July 2019.

In her capacity as a producer, Robbie pitched Barbie to Warner Bros. herself. During the green-light meeting, she compared the film to Steven Spielberg's Jurassic Park (1993) and also suggested at the time in jest that it would gross over $1 billion. Later on, she approached Greta Gerwig—whose previous films, particularly Little Women (2019), Robbie enjoyed—to screenwrite. Gerwig was in post-production for another film, and took the assignment on the condition that her husband, Noah Baumbach, also write the script. Gerwig would sign on to also direct the film in July 2021. Robbie said the film aimed at subverting expectations and giving audiences "the thing you didn't know you wanted". In August 2023, Variety revealed that she would earn "roughly $50 million in salary and box office bonuses" as star and producer.

=== Writing ===
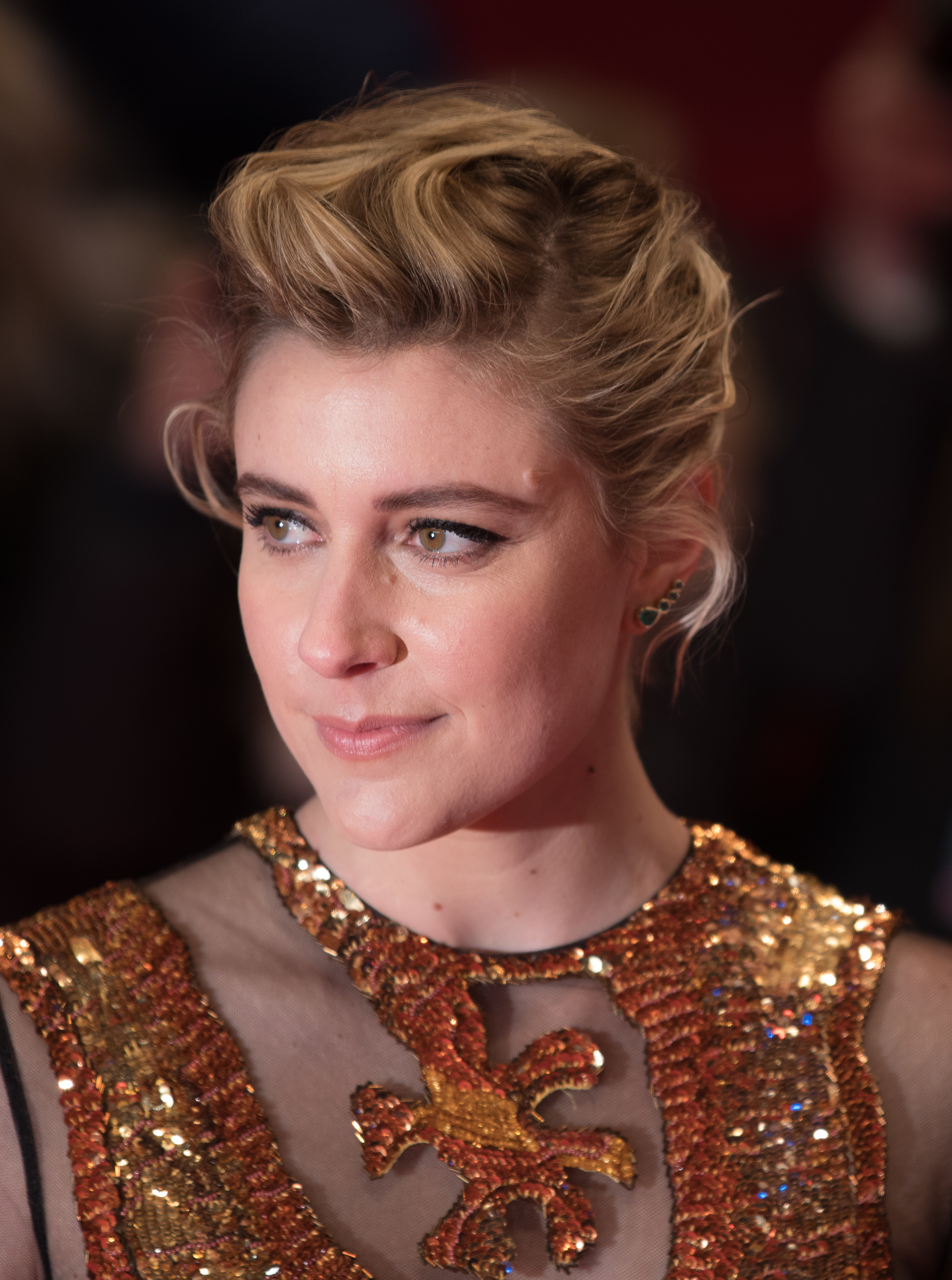
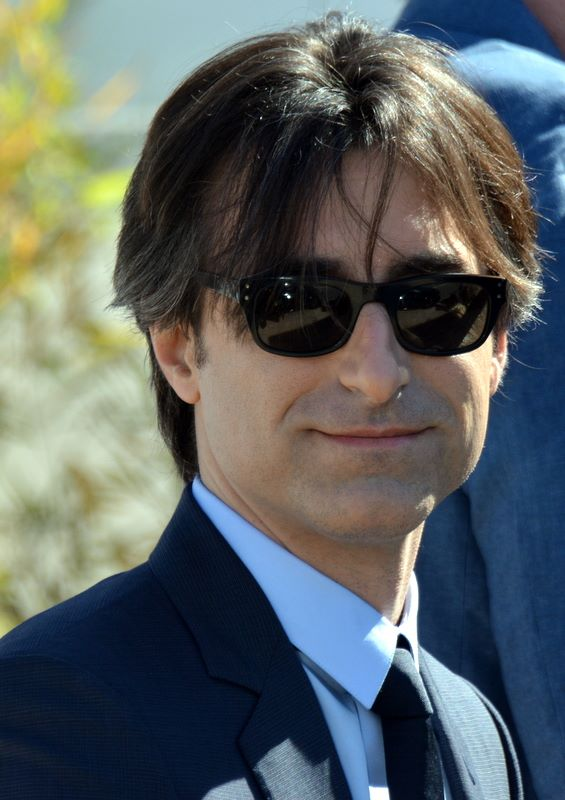
Director Greta Gerwig (left) co-wrote the screenplay with her husband, Noah Baumbach (right)

As writers, Gerwig and Baumbach were given full creative freedom. They worked on the screenplay during the 2020–2021 COVID-19 pandemic lockdowns at their house in Long Island. Baumbach felt he understood the film's purpose once Gerwig had shown him the first scene, identifying the "element" as "embracing mortality and sadness and sickness and everything that it means to be human”. Gerwig was also inspired by the real-life story of Barbie creator Ruth Handler. Gerwig's film treatment consisted of an abstract poem on Barbie influenced by the Apostles' Creed. For the narrative arc, she was partially inspired by the non-fiction book Reviving Ophelia (1994) by Mary Pipher, which accounts the effects of societal pressures on American teenage girls. She also found inspiration in classic Technicolor musicals such as The Red Shoes (1948) and The Umbrellas of Cherbourg (1964), and said: "They have such a high level of what we came to call authentic artificiality. You have a painted sky in a soundstage. Which is an illusion, but it's also really there. The painted backdrop is really there. The tangibility of the artifice is something that we kept going back to". The script also contains candid criticism of Mattel, which created skepticism among Mattel officials when they received the first version. However, Kreiz decided to trust Gerwig. Brenner noted that "being safe in this world doesn't work" as she interpreted Barbie to be a "bold" and "trailblazer" figure. As a result, Will Ferrell's portrayal as the Mattel CEO was meant to be an allegory for corporate America. Kreiz praised Ferrell and said that while Mattel officials took their brands seriously, they did not take themselves seriously. Gerwig and Robbie had felt the film was "most certainly a feminist film", but Mattel officials rejected the description because of the inherent sexism and misandry. Gerwig and Robbie informed the studio that they would explore the controversies and problematic parts of Barbie, but also convinced the studio that they would respect the product.

Gerwig was also influenced by her childhood experiences with Barbie. Her mother discouraged her from purchasing such dolls, but eventually allowed her to. Opting to acknowledge the controversial nature of the Barbie doll, Gerwig chose to create a film where she would be both "doing the thing and subverting the thing", in the sense that she would be celebrating the feminism behind Barbie while also noting the controversial beauty standards associated with it. She was also fascinated by the idea that humans created dolls, which in turn imitate humans, feeling that "we're in constant conversation with inanimate objects", while also conveying an affirmative message to the audience to "just be yourself and know that that's enough". The film deliberately juxtaposed contradictory messaging, such as critiquing consumerism yet glamorizing plastic products; and in the film's ending, where Barbie desires to be more than just a plastic doll. Gerwig made the film as an "earnest attempt to make amends" between affirming women's worth and conveying the impossibility of perfection, which some perceived to be standards associated with Barbie.

Reflecting upon the maximalism of Barbie, Gerwig said the "ontology of Barbie" was similar to what she perceived as William Shakespeare's maximalism, which she enjoyed in his works. She grounded the film in what she described as a "heightened theatricality that allows you to deal with big ideas in the midst of anarchic play". She also described the film as being anarchic, unhinged, and humanist. She felt the film originated from the "deep isolation of the pandemic", opining that the line in which Barbie says "Do you guys ever think about dying?" exemplifies the film's anarchic nature. She also found the idea of Barbie being "constrained in multitudes" as "all of these women are Barbie and Barbie is all of these women" to be "trippy" and felt as a result, Barbie did not need to have her own personal life, as she was attuned to her environment. She also described the story as mirroring a girl's journey from childhood to adolescence, though she did not deem it to be a coming of age film and felt that the film ultimately "ends up, really, about being human".

Primarily, she began her writing by interpreting Barbie as living in a utopia and eventually experiencing reality, where she would have to "confront all the things that were shielded from them in this place [Barbieland]". She also drew parallels to the story of Adam and Eve and taking inspiration from John Milton's Paradise Lost, particularly being inspired by the concept that there is "no poetry without pain". To underscore the tragic elements of Barbie and Ken facing the real world, she focused on elements of dissonance. As such, she chose to keep a scene featuring Robbie's Barbie telling an older woman that she is beautiful after being requested to remove it, as she felt that the scene epitomized "the heart of the movie". She also desired to provide a "counterargument" to Barbie by featuring a scene in which Barbie learns that some women do not like her, and felt it gave the film "real intellectual and emotional power". As such, a scene is featured in which Barbie is being stared at inappropriately on the Venice Beach, which Gerwig chose to feature as she felt it was a universal experience, being especially relevant for actors. She was inspired by an audition she did in which she wore overalls and felt that she did not perform well in.

The ending of the film features Barbie saying the line "I'm here to see my gynecologist", with Gerwig describing it as a "mic drop kind of joke". She had chosen to include the line as she had wanted to instill confidence in younger girls, as she had been embarrassed about her body when she was younger. Barbie also explores the negative consequences of hierarchical power structures, with Gerwig saying that she extrapolated that "Barbies rule and Kens are an underclass" and felt it was similar to the Planet of the Apes. Ken has low self-esteem and seeks approval from Barbie, which Gerwig identified as a good source for a story. Gosling compared Gerwig's vision to Milton Glaser's I Love New York logo, as he felt Gerwig created the film's characters as a way of understanding the contemporary world. Ken has the only power ballad in the film, and Gerwig had identified it as the moment in which she felt the film transcended what a Barbie film traditionally should have been.

=== Casting ===
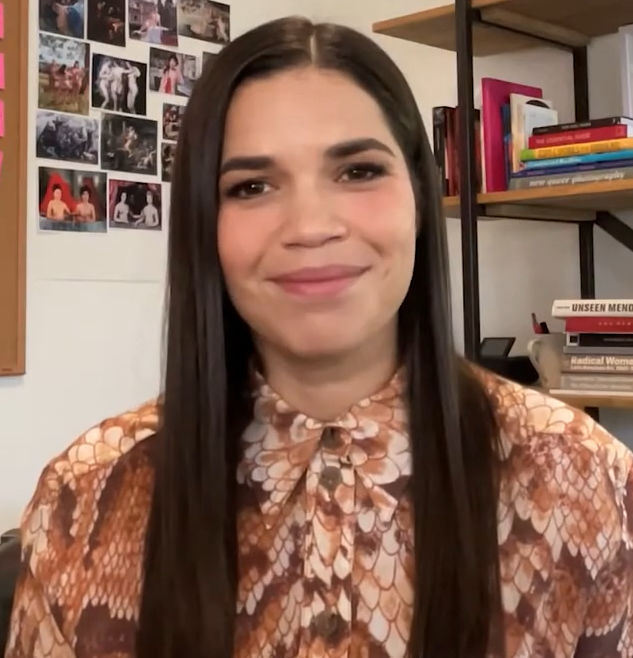
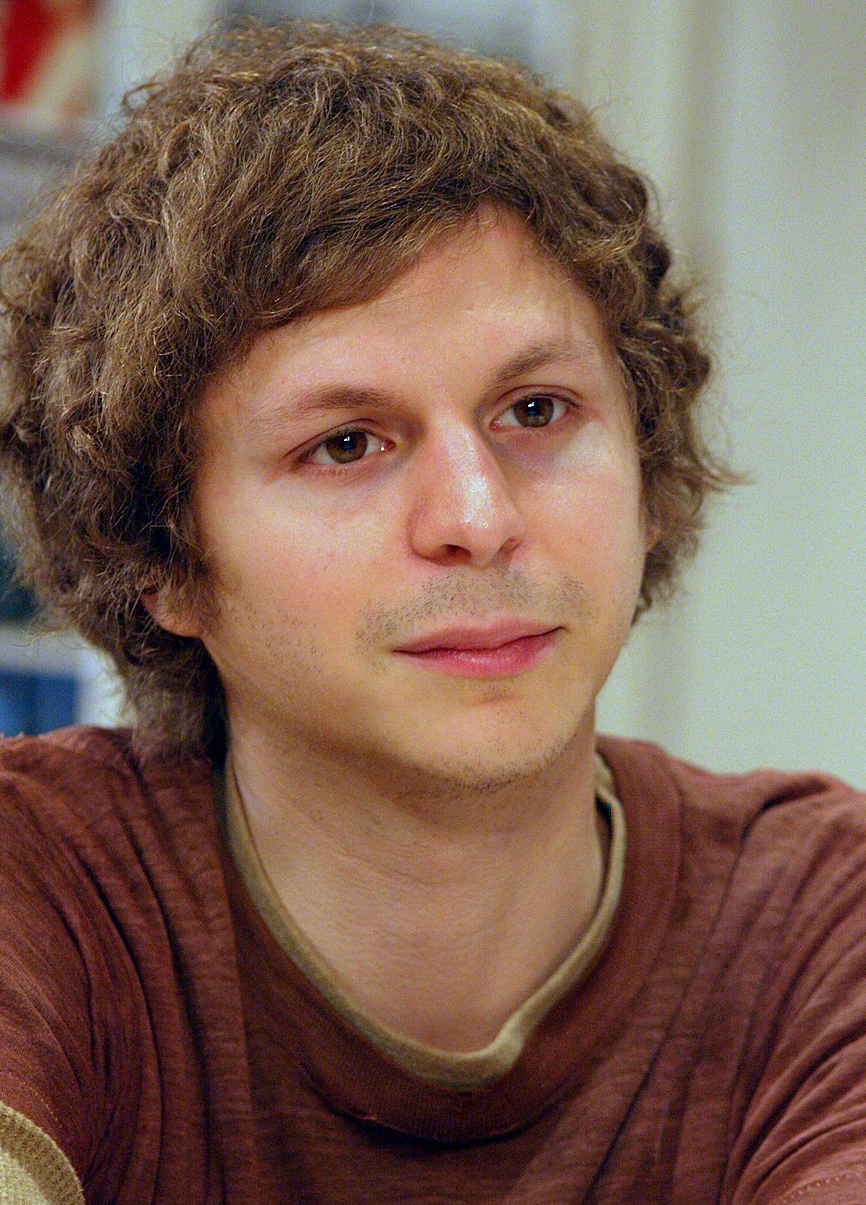
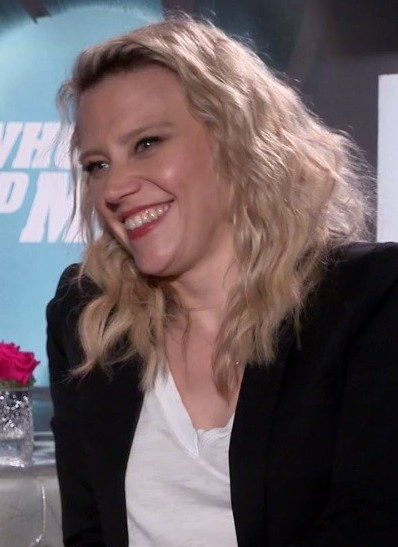
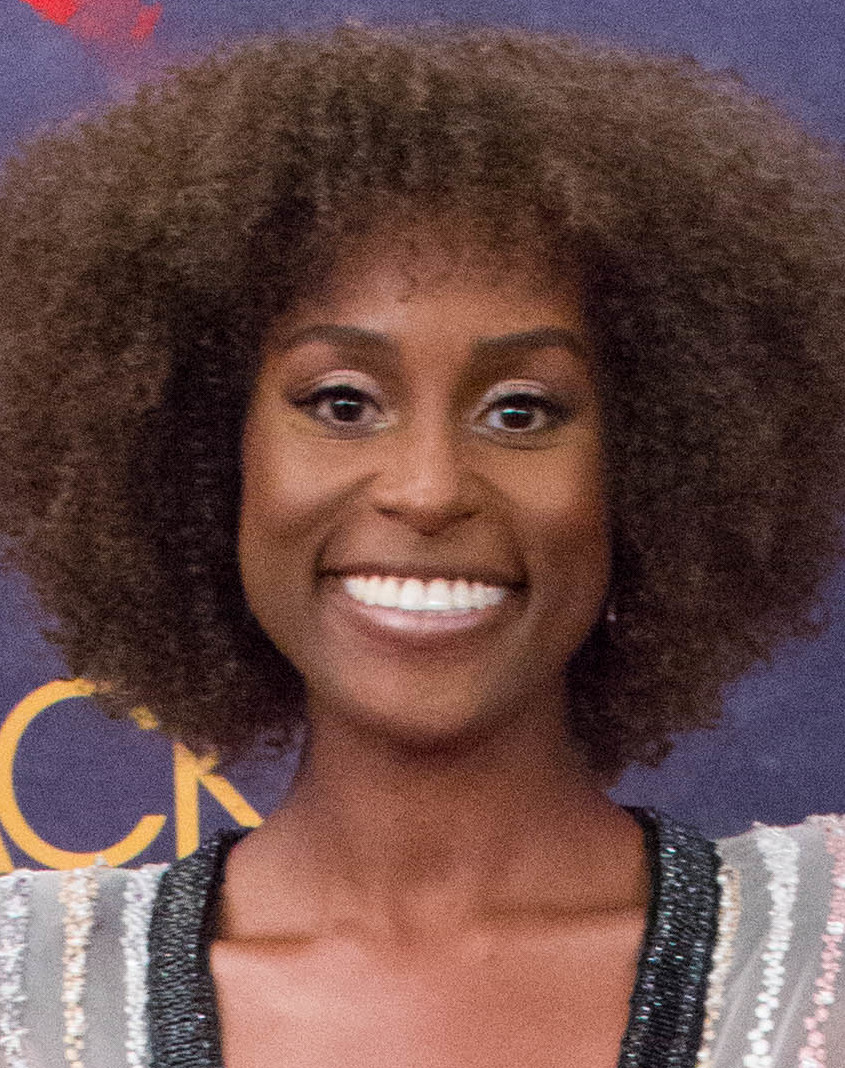
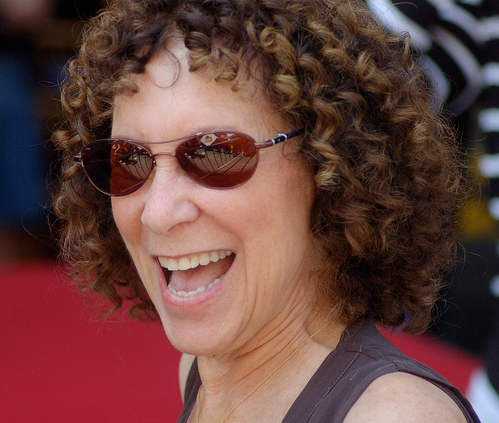
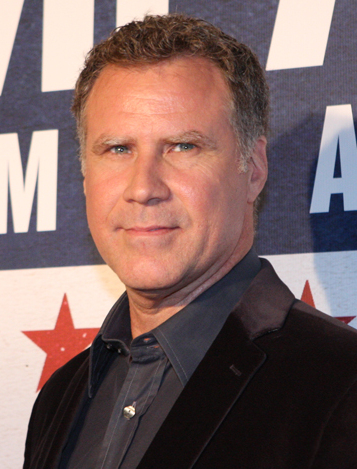
The film's main supporting cast includes (clockwise) America Ferrera, Michael Cera, Kate McKinnon, Issa Rae, Rhea Perlman, and Will Ferrell

Gerwig and Robbie searched for actresses with "Barbie energy", a trait they described as "a certain ineffable combination of beauty and exuberance". In October 2021, Ryan Gosling entered final negotiations to play Ken in the film. America Ferrera, Simu Liu, and Kate McKinnon were cast in February 2022. Liu auditioned for the film after his agent raved about the script being one of the best they had ever read. In March 2022, Ariana Greenblatt, Alexandra Shipp, and Emma Mackey were revealed to be in the cast. Will Ferrell joined the cast in April, along with Issa Rae, Michael Cera, Hari Nef, Kingsley Ben-Adir, Rhea Perlman, Ncuti Gatwa, Emerald Fennell, Sharon Rooney, Scott Evans, Ana Cruz Kayne, Connor Swindells, Ritu Arya, and Jamie Demetriou. In April 2023, a trailer revealed that John Cena had joined the cast. It was later reported that Cena had spontaneously been offered a part in the film after paying for Robbie's meal in London during production. Helen Mirren narrated the film's trailer and the film itself. Robbie and Gosling were each paid $12.5 million for their participation as actors.

Olivia Colman filmed a cameo but it was cut from the film. Robbie wanted Gal Gadot to play a Barbie in the film, but Gadot was unavailable due to scheduling conflicts. Gerwig wanted her frequent collaborators Timothée Chalamet and Saoirse Ronan to make cameo appearances, but neither was available; Gerwig later revealed that during a visit to the set, Chalamet said he should have been in the film. Additionally, Bowen Yang, Dan Levy, and Ben Platt were considered to play Kens. Jonathan Groff was the first choice for Allan, played by Cera, but turned it down. Matt Bomer auditioned and was offered a role but ultimately turned it down due to the production schedule. Ben Affleck was initially set to cameo during the beach fight sequence but scheduling conflicts with Air (2023) resulted in him having to back out and his role in the film was rewritten for Cera.

=== Set design ===
Sarah Greenwood and Katie Spencer were the set designer and decorator, respectively, for Barbie. For the Barbie Dreamhouse, they drew inspiration from mid-century modernist architecture found in Palm Springs, including the 1946 Kaufmann Desert House by Richard Neutra, and the photography of Slim Aarons. Gerwig wanted to capture "what was so ridiculously fun about the Dreamhouses", alluding to its previous models, and referenced Pee-wee's Big Adventure (1985), the paintings of Wayne Thiebaud, and the apartment of Gene Kelly's character in the Technicolor musical An American in Paris (1951). "Everything needed to be tactile, because toys are, above all, things you touch", Gerwig said of the use of practical effects instead of computer-generated imagery (CGI) to capture the sky and the San Jacinto Mountains. The set design is also noted for its extensive use of a specific shade of pink, Pantone 219. Rosco Laboratories, the film's paint supplier, faced international shortages due to COVID-19-related supply-chain issues, as well as freezing temperatures that damaged stock; the film's sets required the company's entire remaining stock of pink. Because Gerwig also wanted to use practical builds, and had to film sequences in miniature models, then composite the footage onto the actual image. She began discussing the production design with cinematographer Rodrigo Prieto, Greenwood, and costume designer Jacqueline Durran a year in advance of filming. She also called director Peter Weir for inspiration on Barbieland, with the idea of creating it as an "interior soundstage world".

=== Costumes, hair, and makeup ===
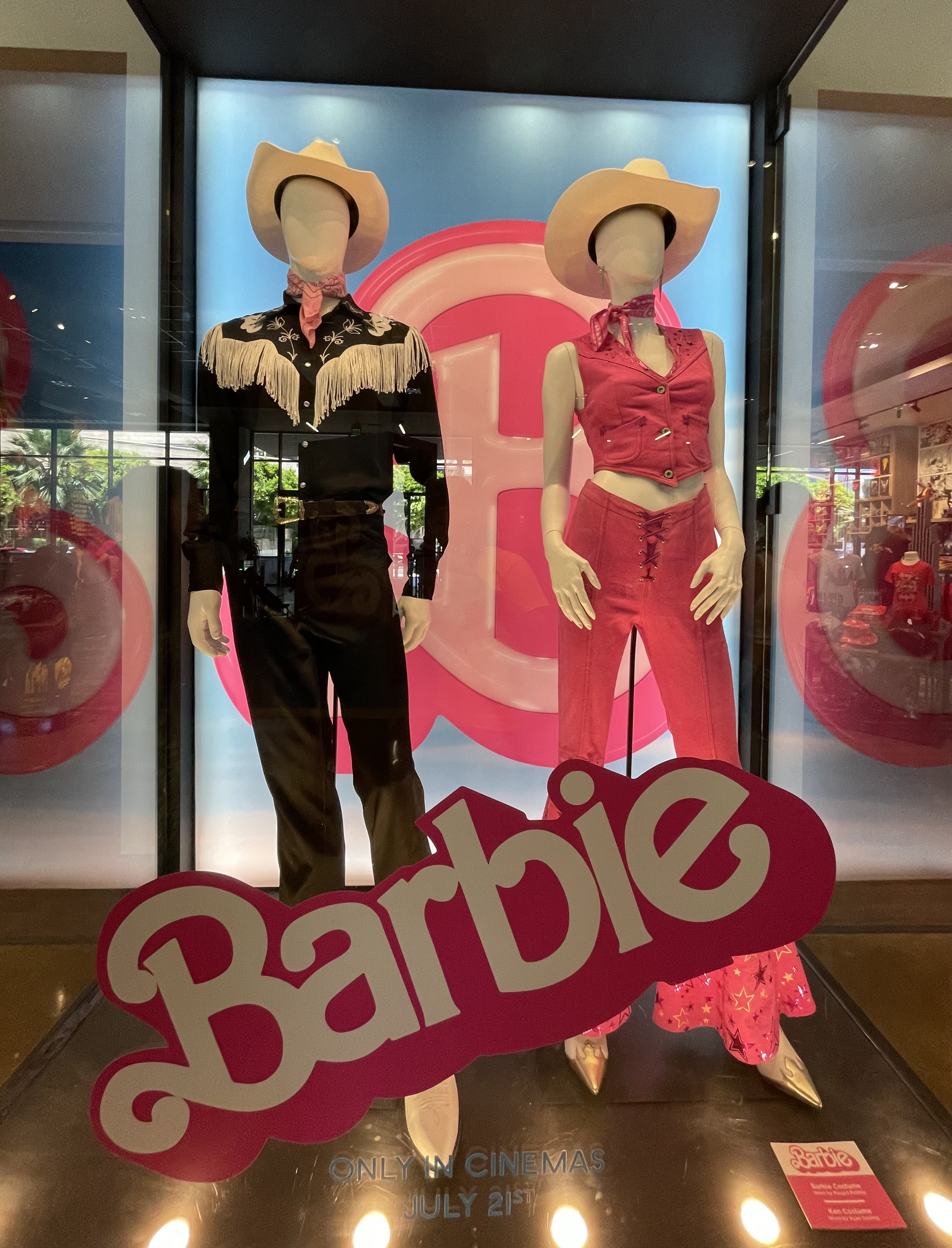
Barbie costumes on display at the Warner Bros. Studio Tour Hollywood

Costume designer Jacqueline Durran, who previously collaborated with Gerwig on Little Women (2019), employed a practical approach to create Barbie's wardrobe: "The defining characteristic of what she wears is where she's going and what she's doing, [i]t's about being completely dressed for your job or task”. To match the film's Barbieland setting, Durran and her team created costumes made of roughly fifteen color combinations "that riffed off the idea of a French Riviera beach in the early 1960s" and drew inspiration from actress Brigitte Bardot. For Ken's outfits, Durran zeroed in a look composed of colorful sportswear from the 1980s, while actor Ryan Gosling suggested a Ken-branded underwear for the character. Durran closely adapted outfits from past iterations of Barbie dolls, such as the 1993 "Western Stampin'" dolls and the 1994 "Hot Skatin'" dolls. She noted the Barbie dolls as "a very useful way to look at different ideas of femininity: what that means, who owns it, and who it's aimed at" and reflected this idea in how she dressed the characters. While the majority of the clothing featured in the film were sourced by Durran and her team, they also pulled pieces from the fashion archives of Chanel. Ivana Primorac was the lead hair and makeup artist for the film. In 2024, Primorac, Marie Larkin, and Clare Corsick jointly won the Make-Up Artists and Hair Stylists Guild Award for Best Period and/or Character Hair Styling in a Feature-Length Motion Picture for Barbie.

=== Filming ===
Principal photography began on March 22, 2022, at Warner Bros. Studios Leavesden in England and wrapped on July 21. Among the notable locations was the Venice Beach Skatepark in Los Angeles, California. Rodrigo Prieto served as cinematographer. Prior to filming, Gerwig organized a sleepover with the female cast members for them to establish positive relationships, also feeling that it "would be the most fun way to kick everything off". She opted to use filming techniques from the 1950s (as Barbie had been a popular toy since 1959) to create a period-accurate look. She also watched Powell and Pressburger's A Matter of Life and Death (1946) to understand how pre-digital visual effects were used to create theatricality. To highlight the tragic nature of Barbie and Ken facing the difficulties of the real world, she directed Robbie and Gosling to act as if they were in a drama.

=== Post-production ===
Editor Nick Huoy returned to collaborate with Greta Gerwig, having also cut Lady Bird and Little Women. Finding the tone of the film was a playful experiment working collaboratively with Gerwig and VFX supervisor Glen Pratt and VFX producer Nick King. Pratt focused on blending the practical with the digital. Practical miniatures were built, scanned, and captured with photogrammetry inspiring the creation of hundreds of digital miniatures to populate Barbieland vistas, set extensions, backdrops, and full CGI shots. Pratt worked with visual effects studios Framestore on Barbieland scenes and UPP on the invisible effects deployed in the real world and a car pursuit sequence.

The palette chosen for the scenes in Barbieland was inspired by the classic three-strip Technicolor look, and was named TechnoBarbie. This required the creation of a software called PPL, a color correcting program which separates the image into the three basic components of blue, green, and red, which can then be manipulated individually.

== Music ==
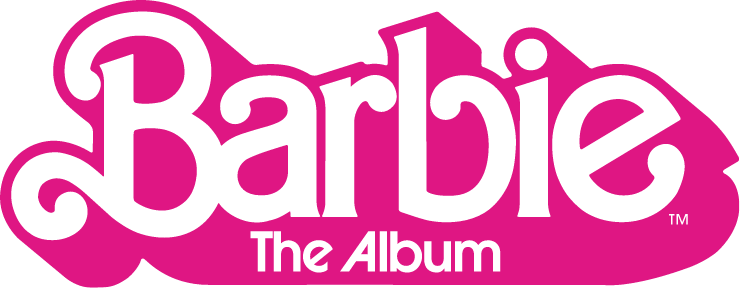
Barbie the Album logo

Mark Ronson and Andrew Wyatt scored the film. The score was released by WaterTower Music on August 4, 2023.

Ronson was also tasked with curating a compilation soundtrack that matched Gerwig's vision for Barbie. As the film was being edited, Ronson and Gerwig showed some of its scenes to artists they wanted on the soundtrack. The soundtrack, Barbie the Album, was released on July 21, 2023, and features music by Ava Max, Charli XCX, Dominic Fike, Fifty Fifty, Gayle, Haim, Ice Spice, Kali, Karol G, Khalid, Sam Smith, Lizzo, Nicki Minaj, Billie Eilish, PinkPantheress, Tame Impala, the Kid Laroi, and cast members Ryan Gosling and Dua Lipa. "Dance the Night" by Dua Lipa was released as the album's lead single on May 26, 2023. It was followed by "Watati" by Karol G on June 2, 2023. "Angel" by Pink Pantheress was released on June 9, 2023, as the first promotional single. "Barbie World" by Nicki Minaj and Ice Spice was released as the album's third single on June 23, 2023. The album's second promotional single, "Speed Drive" by Charli XCX was released on June 30, 2023. On July 6, 2023, the album's third and final promotional single, "Barbie Dreams" by Fifty Fifty and Kaliii was released. On July 10, 2023, Warner Bros. released a preview clip of Ryan Gosling singing "I'm Just Ken". The album's fourth single, "What Was I Made For?" by Billie Eilish, was released on July 13, 2023.

Despite fan expectations for the 1997 song "Barbie Girl" by the pop band Aqua to feature in the film, Ulrich Møller-Jørgensen, manager for Aqua lead singer Lene Nystrøm, said that it was not used; Variety speculated that it was due to bad relations between Mattel and MCA Records, the song's American publisher, who engaged in a series of lawsuits over it from 1997 to 2002. "Barbie World", a rework of the song, was instead used in the film. It samples "Barbie Girl"; Aqua is credited as a performer and co-writer on the track.

The film features multiple renditions of the 1989 song "Closer to Fine" by the Indigo Girls and the 1997 song "Push" by Matchbox Twenty, the latter of which Ken adopts as his favorite song after visiting the real world, which becomes "a tongue-in-cheek anthem of patriarchal dominance" in the fictional Barbieland. While many reviews of the film interpreted this as a critique of the song, Gerwig said that she was a fan of Matchbox Twenty and "I never put anything in a movie I don't love”. Gerwig got permission for usage from the song's composer Rob Thomas, who said he liked how the scene described that the Kens were "playing it at you instead of for you". "Spice Up Your Life" by Spice Girls plays in a flashback scene showing a little girl's rough play creating "Weird Barbie".

== Marketing ==
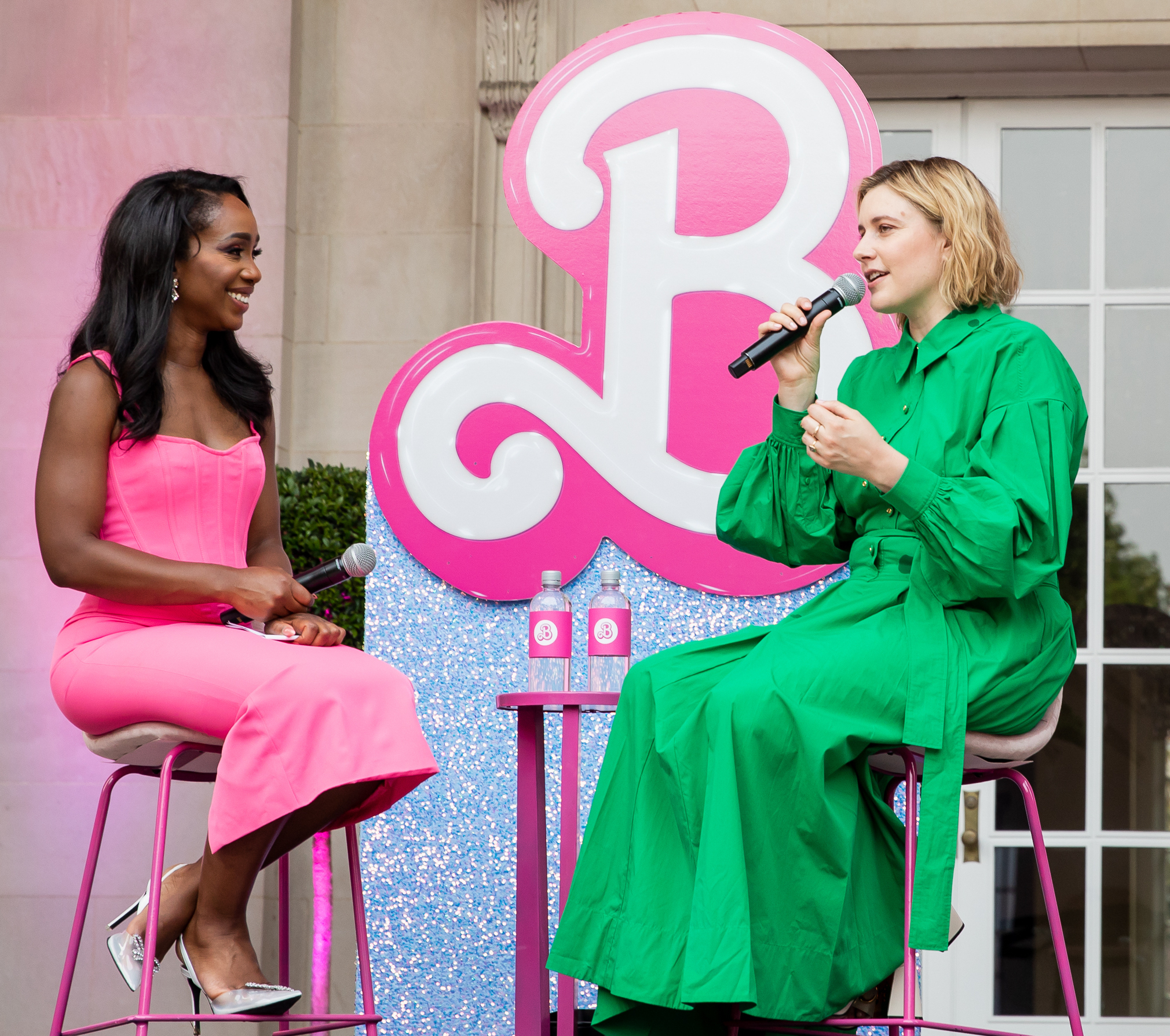
Director Greta Gerwig (right) and Abby Phillip (left) at an event for Barbie at the British Embassy in Washington, D.C.

Barbie received an extensive marketing campaign. In the months leading up to its release, Mattel entered into several Barbie-themed promotional partnerships and collaborations with various brands, including Airbnb, Aldo Group, Bloomingdale's, Burger King Brazil, Chi Haircare, Forever 21, Gap Inc., Hot Topic, Krispy Kreme Philippines, MINISO, Primark, Progressive Insurance, Spirit Halloween, Ulta, and Xbox. Studio parent company Warner Bros. Discovery also engaged in cross-promotion through its TV channels, most prominently with an HGTV renovation reality competition series, Barbie Dreamhouse Challenge, coproduced by Mattel Television, which premiered shortly before the film's release. Trade publication Variety reported that Warner Bros. spent $150 million promoting Barbie—more than the $145 million budget used to produce the film itself.

A first-look image of the film was revealed during a Warner Bros. presentation at CinemaCon in April 2022. Released to the public on April 27, 2022, it showed Margot Robbie as Barbie, behind the wheel of her pink 1956 Chevrolet Corvette. Collider commented: "This photo is just further proof that Robbie was made to play this role. She just looks like a Barbie doll come to life—it's almost uncanny”. On June 15, 2022, a second still featuring Ryan Gosling as Ken was released. Despite noting similarities between his look in the image and his previous roles, The Guardian asserted that "there is a very strong chance that this will be [Gosling's] defining role".

A Barbie booth was opened at the 2022 CCXP event in São Paulo, Brazil. The film's first teaser trailer debuted during preview screenings of Avatar: The Way of Water in December 2022. It featured a parody of the opening "Dawn of Man" sequence in Stanley Kubrick's 1968 film 2001: A Space Odyssey, where Robbie (clad in Barbie's original 1959 outfit) imitates an alien monolith whose influence on the history of dolls is narrated by Helen Mirren. Along with a theatrical poster, the teaser trailer was released to the public on December 16, 2022. Rolling Stone praised the 2001 homage and the trailer's vibrant colors, and remarked on its vague hints of the plot: "One has to wonder when, or better yet how, it will all get shaken up".

At the 2023 Academy Awards, Robbie co-presented a tribute to Warner Bros. with Morgan Freeman. During the montage, they reflected on the roles and projects they had shared with the company, and Freeman eventually referred to Robbie as 'Barbie'. On April 4, 2023, 24 character posters of the several Barbies and Kens featured in the film, tagged with brief descriptions, were shared on Barbie's social media accounts. Empire remarked: "You might have thought that Multiverse fever would be constrained generally to comic book films and never-would-have-called-it Oscar winners [Everything Everywhere All at Once]. But... it seems Greta Gerwig's Barbie movie will also be flooding the screen with variants, this time of plastic dolls Barbie and Ken". A second teaser trailer was unveiled shortly after the posters' release, featuring a rendition of the Beach Boys' 1964 surf rock song "Fun, Fun, Fun". The Washington Post noted that the "visually striking" and "polysemic" teaser captivated multiple demographics because of its humor, color palette, and the Barbie doll's cross-generational appeal. An official trailer for the film was released on May 25, 2023. Critics noted its existential tone set against upbeat music. Ben Travis of Empire said: "There's much to discuss here—not least, that it looks visually impeccable" and speculated Academy Awards attention for its production and costume design. A float promoting the film was featured in the 2023 WeHo Pride Parade in Los Angeles; two of its LGBTQ+ cast members, Alexandra Shipp and Scott Evans, were present.

In June 2023, a French Barbie poster went viral for including the tagline "Elle peut tout faire. Lui, c'est juste Ken" ("She can do everything. He's just Ken"). Ken is the verlan slang term for "fuck" in French—i.e., the phonological inversion of nique, while c'est ("he is") is a homophone for sait ("he knows how")—so the tagline could also be read as "She can do everything. He just knows how to fuck". Analysts concluded that the pun was most likely intentional, as the slang term is common knowledge among French speakers; Warner Bros. would neither confirm nor deny this.

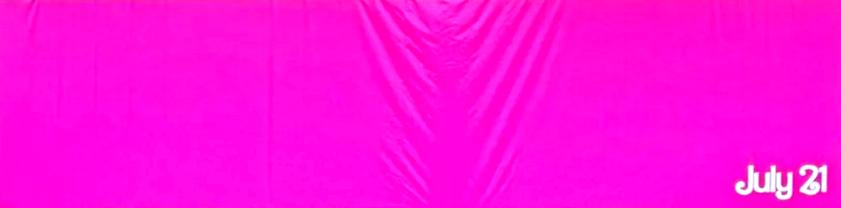
An all-pink billboard used to promote the film.

Leading up to the release, pink billboards, blank apart from the film's release date, appeared worldwide, and a real-world "Barbie Dreamhouse" in Malibu, California became available to rent through Airbnb.

Actress Margot Robbie received praise for her red carpet fashion while promoting the tour. Designers including Vivienne Westwood, Hervé Léger, and Schiaparelli created custom outfits inspired by recognizable Barbie doll clothes.

On July 14, 2023, SAG-AFTRA, an American labor union of film, television and voice actors, declared a strike action, effectively halting any promotional event that involved the guild's members. Robbie showed her support for the action. SAG-AFTRA President Fran Drescher later claimed that the studios "duped" the guild into accepting a 12-day extension for negotiations to continue promoting summer films like Barbie. On July 21, 2023, Mattel and Miniso Group Holding Limited opened the Barbiecore flagship store in Changsha, China, coinciding with the film's theatrical release. Coinciding with the film's release, a stop motion crossover trailer with the animated film Teenage Mutant Ninja Turtles: Mutant Mayhem from Paramount Pictures, produced by Seth Rogen, was released on July 20, 2023.

== Themes and analysis ==
As with the doll itself, feminism and related themes in the film were the subject of discussion. (Note: Attributed to multiple references:) Some reviews for the film saw it as satirizing capitalism, while others perceived it as being a satire utilizing capitalist themes.

=== Philosophy ===
Barbie has been characterized as exploring themes of existentialism. Lucy Ford of GQ wrote that the film "ruminates on the very idea of what makes us human, the idea of 'the other', whether there's truly such a thing as autonomy or if we're all simply pawns to be picked up and disposed of when we are no longer useful". Ford observed that, in the film, Barbie and Ken go on "opposite but equal" journeys of self-discovery, after venturing out into the real world and learning that it is an oppressive patriarchal society as opposed to the matriarchal utopia that is Barbieland, and get "caught in the crosshairs of being both sentient and someone else's idea, battling with free will and the omnipresent predetermined rules about where to go and how to act". In Clark University, Professor of Philosophy Wiebke Deimling compared a scene in the film, in which Barbie has to make a choice between going back to her perfect life in Barbieland or learning the truth about her existence in the real world, to the experience machine, a thought experiment by American philosopher Robert Nozick. Diemling also observed that gender in Barbieland is performative, noting how the Kens behave before and after a patriarchy is established. Alissa Wilkinson of Vox compared Barbieland to the biblical Garden of Eden, with Barbie and Ken as inverted parallels of Adam and Eve. She saw Barbie and Ken's first impression "that they're suddenly self-conscious and aware of being looked at" in the real world as the film's version of the Fall. Chinese film critic Li Jingfei (李竞菲) compared Barbie's sudden awareness of death to the moment when Siddhārtha Gautama left the palace of his birth and first learned of suffering and death, which eventually led to his enlightenment.

=== Feminism ===
Katie Pickles of The Conversation said that Barbie shows how the matriarchy can be "as bad" as the patriarchy, with the Kens being the objectified and excluded sex in Barbieland. Pickles further comments that the true heroes were outcasts such as Weird Barbie and Allan, who deprogrammed the Barbies from tolerating the status quo. She believes that this aligns with Gerwig's conception of feminism, where "everyone stands in the sunshine".

Jack Butler of National Review rejected the perception of the film as a "shallow, man-hating, and repulsive screed" and argued that the film is instead a "post-feminist satire of what feminists imagine a perfect world looking like and of what they imagine male dominance is like", noted that in the real world, "Ken is rebuffed in all of his attempts to join the male hierarchy that purportedly dominates the world. He must return to Barbie land to institute it; what he institutes there is so shallow that it collapses almost as quickly as it is set up. Meanwhile, though Robbie's Barbie restores female dominance in Barbieland, she chooses not to stay there, electing instead to become fully human".

Ross Douthat writing in The New York Times argued that the film "is a movie with a feminist default, but also [has] complicated and sometimes muddled feelings about what the sexual revolution has done and where feminism ought to go". Douthat comments that the female-centric nature of Barbieland is dystopian, where men are nothing more than "arm-candy", and where pregnant women and children are marginalized. He describes the film as "against the resilient patriarchy, but wary of the girlboss alternative. It wants womanhood and motherhood, but it doesn't want the Kens back in charge, and it doesn't really know what purpose men should serve".

Many journalists coupled Barbie with the Eras Tour by Taylor Swift for the concurrent representation of recontextualized mainstream femininity. Michelle Goldberg of The New York Times described the launch of the film and the tour, their rave public reception, and the associated critical discourses as the biggest cultural phenomena of 2023 summer, explaining that "beneath their slick, exuberant pop surfaces, [both the film and the tour] tell female coming-of-age stories marked by existential crises and bitter confrontations with sexism". Ben Sisario considered both the works as critiques of patriarchy, while Talia Lakritz of Business Insider said both of them "reclaim girlhood without rescinding power". Similarly, Chris Willman stated that both use patriarchy as a subject of irony "while being utterly friendly to and welcoming of men as much as anybody", eventually becoming a billion-dollar-earning phenomenon.

=== Masculinity ===
In the Los Angeles Times, Jean Guerrero presented a subtext to the film's feminist exterior, in which "a world that disregards men and their feelings is an inverted form of patriarchy and also cruel", and added: "The film is a rare product of mainstream culture that invites men to reimagine masculinity for their own sake. It acknowledges the identity crisis and loss of hope, economic promise and life purpose among American men. These struggles are often ignored by progressives, but conveniently and poisonously exploited by right-wing manfluencers from Andrew Tate to Josh Hawley ... The film's reception has focused on its messages of women's empowerment, but what makes it a radical story is that it also invites women to reimagine feminism so that it doesn't ignore male struggles."

Nicholas Balaisis contended in Psychology Today that Barbie provides a "relatively nuanced portrayal of masculinity" in two cases that resonated with issues and concerns frequent in clinical psychology and therapy: In the first case, which concerns the "over-valuation of a woman's gaze and attention on male sense of self-esteem, and even an existential sense of identity", Ken turns to patriarchal expression and masculine dominance "over other men, women or objects" because he does not receive the "sense of attractiveness, worth, and general self-value" he wants from Barbie's gaze and attention. In the second case, which concerns "the relationship to shame or existential solitude and the conversion to sex-as-soothing", when Barbie approaches Ken in the third act of the film for consolation, he interprets it as a sexual advance and tries to kiss her, which Dr. Balaisis likened to "the same way that shame can quickly morph into resentment and anger, here we see loneliness and existential angst being converted into a sexual plea — for sex to solve and resolve these bad feelings".

Megan Garber of The Atlantic found that Ken and his journey of self-discovery "mimics adolescence", writing: "Like any teenager, Ken is figuring out who he is, and trying the world's possibilities on for size. But his immaturity is not contained, and this is its problem. His adolescent approach to the world, instead, inflicts itself on everyone else". Garber concluded that Ken embodies a "core idea" in the film "that patriarchy is a profound form of immaturity". Eliana Dockterman of Time noted that Ken's radicalization resembles the men's rights movement, particularly in his "feelings of emasculation", male fragility and evangelization of the patriarchy.

== Release ==
=== Theatrical ===
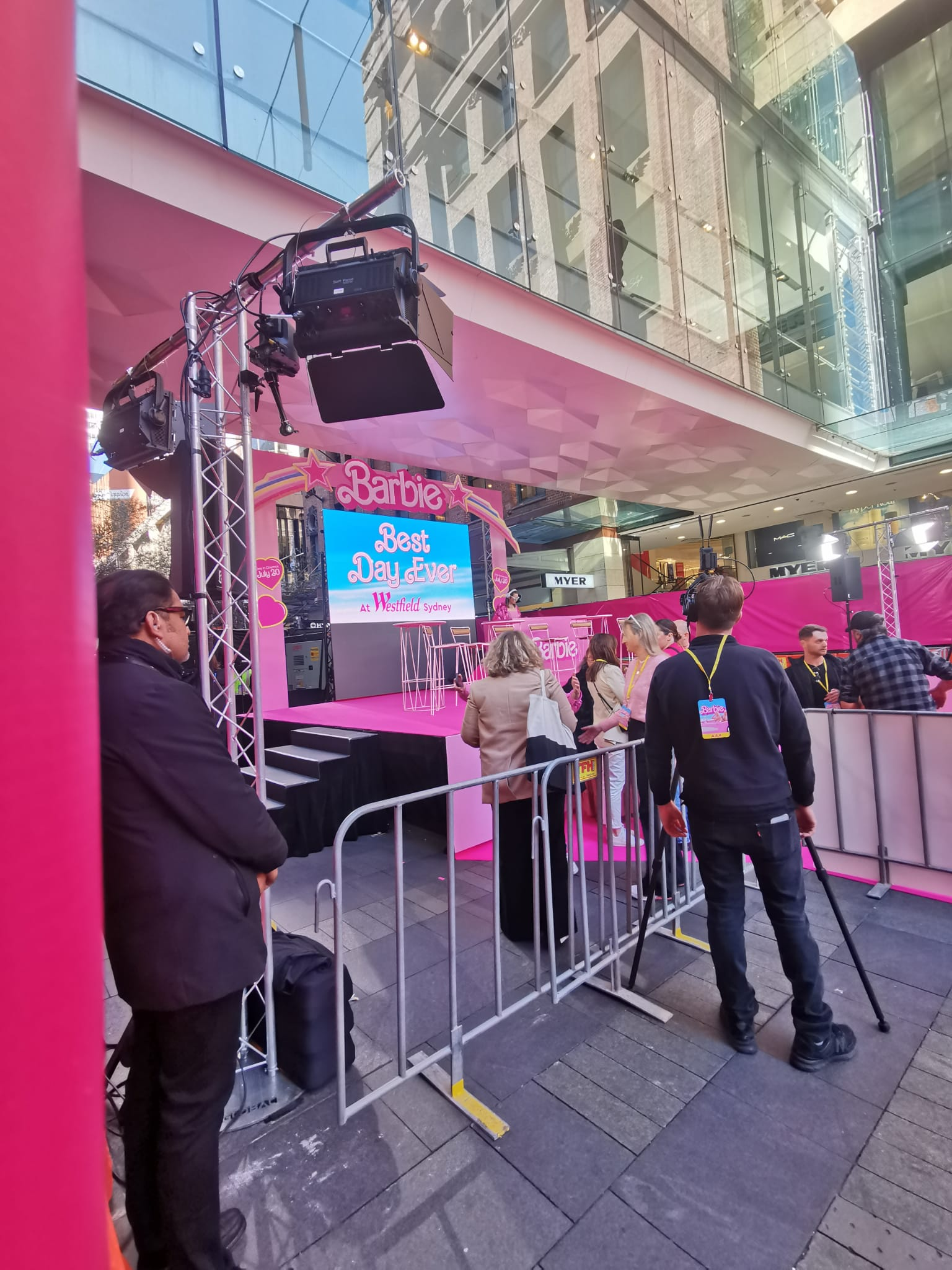
The Barbie pink carpet premiere in Sydney, Australia

Barbie had its world premiere at the Shrine Auditorium in Los Angeles on July 9, 2023, followed by the European premiere at Cineworld Leicester Square in London on July 12, 2023. It was released theatrically in the United States and the United Kingdom on July 21, 2023, taking over the original release date of Coyote vs. Acme. Previous iterations of the project were set for June 2, 2017; May 12, 2017; June 29, 2018; August 8, 2018; and May 8, 2020.

In August 2023, it was announced that the film would be re-released in IMAX theaters on September 22, 2023, for one week only, along with a new post-credit scene. The IMAX edition starts with an onscreen introduction by Greta Gerwig, who notes the advantages of the IMAX format. The post-credits scene includes an intro of Margot Robbie's Barbie, in her 1959 Barbie bathing suit, taking a human-sized Ken doll on camera, which transforms into Ryan Gosling's Ken; it is followed by humorous outtakes, e.g., whether Barbie should marry Barney the Dinosaur, and a voiceover by Robbie hoping people enjoyed the experience. As Sarah Little notes on Screen Rant, "The meta post-credits scene features [narrator Helen] Mirren as herself walking in on Midge, played by Emerald Fennell, giving birth". The film also received a Spanish language release in the United States and Puerto Rico on the TheaterEars app.

=== Barbenheimer ===
Barbie was released on the same day as Oppenheimer, a biographical film about J. Robert Oppenheimer written and directed by Christopher Nolan based on the 2005 book American Prometheus, and distributed by Universal Pictures. Due to the tonal and genre contrast between the two films, many social media users created memes and ironic posts about how the two films appealed to different audiences, and how they should be viewed as a double feature. The concept was named "Barbenheimer". In an interview with La Vanguardia, Oppenheimer star Cillian Murphy endorsed the phenomenon, saying, "My advice would be for people to go see both, on the same day. If they are good films, then that's cinema's gain". The phenomenon was widely credited with boosting interest in the film, with a total of 79% of tickets sold over the weekend (52% for Barbie) being for the two films, a total of 18.5 million people.

=== Home media ===
Barbie was released on digital download on September 12, 2023, and was released on Ultra HD Blu-ray, Blu-ray, and DVD on October 17, 2023, by Warner Bros. Home Entertainment. The film was available for streaming exclusively on Max on December 15, 2023, including an American Sign Language version.

=== Censorship ===
==== Nine-dash line controversy ====
The controversy over the alleged appearance of the nine-dash line (a depiction of the South China Sea from Chinese perspective) in the film began when Vietnam's film censorship authority banned the film for allegedly displaying such lines. In contrast, the counterpart from the Philippines requested that the lines in question be blurred. Both countries have banned the films Abominable (2019) and Uncharted (2022) for featuring the actual nine-dash line. The nine-dash line is controversial due to maritime border disputes between China, Vietnam, Taiwan, Malaysia, Brunei, and the Philippines.

===== Vietnam =====
On July 3, 2023, Vietnamese newspaper Tuổi Trẻ quoted Vi Kiến Thành, head of the Department of Cinema, as announcing that Barbie would be banned in Vietnam because it contained "the offending image of the nine-dash line". The Tiền Phong newspaper reported that the nine-dash line "appears multiple times in the film". The film was originally scheduled to be released in Vietnam on July 21.

Speaking to Voice of America, Trịnh Hữu Long (founder of the research group Legal Initiatives for Vietnam) said, "The censors will even be praised for overreacting to the unclear map, by both their superiors and the public, because anti-China sentiment runs deep into the country's political culture", and that "the government is surely using legitimate nationalist reasoning to strengthen its entire censorship system", while Michael Caster at the free expression group Article 19 said, "Maps are political, and borders often bear historical wounds, but rather than ensuring free and open discussion, the knee jerk response to censor seldom supports historical or transitional justice".

Speaking to Vox, University of California, Berkeley professor Peter Zinoman said, "To the Chinese, the nine-dash line signifies their legitimate claims to the South China Sea", and "to the Vietnamese, it symbolizes a brazen act of imperialist bullying that elevates Chinese national interest over an older shared set of interests of socialist brotherhood". Harvard University professor Huệ-Tâm Hồ Tài said since the producers of the film were aiming for the mainland Chinese market in the hopes that it would be a blockbuster, "they are ready to accept [mainland China's] view of geography. Disinformation works by repetition". New York University professor Kevin Li said, "In my view, banning [Barbie] was a no-brainer." In response to Vietnam's ban, Chinese Foreign Ministry spokesperson Mao Ning stated at a press briefing on July 4 that the "South China Sea issue" should not be linked with "normal cultural exchange".

===== Philippines =====
When news of Vietnam's ban reached the Philippines, Senator Francis Tolentino, vice chairman of the Philippine Senate Committee on Foreign Relations, told CNN Philippines that Barbie may also be banned in the country because it "denigrates" Filipino sovereignty. Senator Jinggoy Estrada called the film to be banned over the alleged inclusion of the nine-dash line; opposition senator Risa Hontiveros quipped "the movie is fiction, and so is the nine-dash line", and suggested adding a disclaimer to the film instead of banning its release. Senator Robin Padilla, chairman of the Senate mass media committee, suggested that the film producers must edit out references to the nine-dash line or risk the film being banned.

On July 11, the Philippines' Movie and Television Review and Classification Board (MTRCB) came to the conclusion that there was "no basis" to banning the film as the map was simply "cartoonish" and that there was no clear nor outright depiction of the nine-dash line, as the line in the film was "not U-Shaped" and had "eight dots or dashes" instead of nine. The board gave the film a PG rating, as well as allowing it to be screened in the country, however they requested Warner Bros. to "blur the controversial lines in order to avoid further misinterpretations". Senator Tolentino said that he respected the MTRCB's decision, but expressed his dismay at it emerging a day before the seventh anniversary of Philippines' victory in an arbitration over the nine-dash line on July 12, 2016. The film was released in the Philippines on July 19, 2023.

===== World map drawing and Warner Bros.' statement =====
Following the news of Vietnam's ban of the film, some media outlets pointed to a scene in the film's trailer featuring a drawing of a world map with a curved line of dashes alongside "Asia" which they said represented China's nine dash line claim to the South China Sea. Warner Bros. stated that it was "not intended to make any type of statement".

With the rising concerns over the alleged appearance of the nine-dash line, several media outlets pointed to a drawing of a world map which appears in a trailer for the film. The Los Angeles Times described the particular image as a "map of 'the real world' [which] looks as if it's been drawn in crayon by a child" with a line of dashes "alongside the coast of what should be China". On July 6, 2023, Warner Bros. issued a statement explaining that the map in the concerned image is a "child-like crayon drawing", with the dashed lines depicting Barbie's journey from Barbieland to the real world and was "not intended to make any type of statement". Jordan Richard Schoenherr from Concordia University said that while the map might seem innocuous, the repeated presentation of images that supported the goals of the Chinese regime risks increasing their acceptance by the audience and is therefore a cause for concern. In the world map drawing, dashed lines can be seen near Asia, the United States, Greenland, Brazil, and Africa.

==== Religious interpretation and LGBTQ+ themes ====
In some Muslim-majority countries, there were attempts to ban the film on moral grounds or for allegedly showing LGBTQ+ themes. Some of them were successful.

===== Pakistan =====
In Pakistan, the film was released nationwide on July 21, 2023. The Punjab Film Censor Board (which handles the censorship in the Punjab province) and other regional equivalents cleared the film for screening. But on July 22, Punjab province's caretaker Minister of Information and Culture Amir Mir used his authority to halt the screenings of the film in the province, alleging that it "[shows] homosexuality". Punjab's Information Secretary Ali Nawaz Malik told Dawn that the film "has been sent to Dubai for a censorship review". On August 1, the final approval was given for the film to be shown in the province.

===== Middle East =====
In the Middle East, the film was initially scheduled to be released on July 19, 2023, before being delayed to August 31. Later, Vox Cinemas, the distributor of Warner Bros. films in the region, announced that the film would be released in the region on August 10. Although the film censorship authorities in the region initially did not specify any reason, it was suggested that the inclusion of a transgender actress in one of the Barbie roles, and the narrations and dialogs related to LGBTQ+ matters might have been the issues with the film.

On August 9, 2023, Lebanon's Minister of Culture Mohammad Mortada, who is backed by Hezbollah, proposed that the film be banned in the country for "[promoting] homosexuality and sexual transformation" and "[contradicting] values of faith and morality" by "diminishing the importance of the family unit". Following Mortada's proposal, the Minister of Interior and Municipalities Bassam Mawlawi asked the relevant authority (which is under the scope of Interior Ministry's General Security) to review the film and give its recommendation. On August 11, it was reported that the Lebanese authority, comprising the representatives from the General Security and the Ministry of Economy and Trade, found no reason to ban the film in the country. On September 1, the film was formally approved for screening in Lebanon for audiences aged 13 and above. Barbie was released in Lebanese theaters on September 7.

Also on August 9, 2023, the Kuwaiti authority formally announced the ban of both Barbie and Australian horror film Talk to Me (which stars a non-binary and transgender actor), with the head of the authority Lafi Al-Subaie accusing the former of "carrying ideas that encourage unacceptable behavior and distort society's values".

===== Algeria =====
On August 13, 2023, just three weeks after its release on July 19, the screenings of Barbie were halted in film theaters in Algeria. According to Reuters, the official source was quoted as saying that the film "promotes homosexuality and other Western deviances" and that it "does not comply with Algeria's religious and cultural beliefs".

== Reception ==
=== Box office ===
Barbie grossed $636.8 million in the United States and Canada, and $810.9 million in other territories, for a worldwide total of $1.448 billion. This was described by Warner Bros. as "reaching a Barbillion". Deadline Hollywood calculated the film's net profit as $421 million, accounting for production budgets, marketing, talent participations, and other costs; box office grosses, television and streaming, and home media revenues placed it second on their list of 2023's "Most Valuable Blockbusters".

It was described as a "record-breaking" box office success during its opening weekend, and set the record for any film that was not a sequel, remake, or superhero property. Barbie became the highest-grossing live-action comedy film of all time, smashing the domestic record formerly held by Home Alone (1990) and the worldwide record formerly held by The Hangover Part II (2011) simultaneously. It has also become Gerwig's highest-grossing film, overtaking its predecessor Little Women (2019). The film crossed the $1 billion mark worldwide on August 6, 2023, making it the only film by a solo female director to do so. This was also the fastest Warner Bros. film to reach $1 billion, beating Harry Potter and the Deathly Hallows – Part 2 (2011). In late August, Barbie surpassed that same film again, becoming Warner Bros.'s highest-grossing film, not adjusted for inflation. By September 2, the film surpassed $1.365 billion at the global box office, replacing The Super Mario Bros. Movie as the highest-grossing film of the year. Additionally, it became the highest-grossing film by a solo female director, surpassing the previous record held by Jia Ling for Hi, Mom (2021).

==== United States and Canada ====
In the United States and Canada, Barbie was released alongside Oppenheimer, and was originally projected to gross $90–125 million from 4,243 theaters in its opening weekend, with Warner Bros. predicting a $75 million debut. The week of their release, AMC Theatres announced that over 40,000 AMC Stubs members had pre-booked tickets to both films on the same day. It earned $70.5 million on its opening day, which included $22.3 million from Wednesday and Thursday night previews, both of which were the best of 2023. Barbie's opening weekend gross of $162 million marked the largest opening since Black Panther: Wakanda Forever ($181.3 million in November 2022). It was also the biggest opening ever for a film helmed by a female director, besting Captain Marvel (2019), and surpassed Suicide Squad (2016) to have Robbie's highest opening weekend, as well as Blade Runner 2049 (2017) to have Gosling's largest opening weekend. It scored the third-highest July opening weekend at the time, behind The Lion King (2019) and Harry Potter and the Deathly Hallows – Part 2. This also marked the third-highest opening weekend for a Warner Bros. film, after the latter film and Batman v Superman: Dawn of Justice (2016). Barbie also scored the biggest opening for a film based on a toy, surpassing Transformers: Revenge of the Fallen (2009). Furthermore, it dethroned The Secret Life of Pets (2016) to achieve the biggest non-sequel July opening weekend. Upon opening, Barbie reached the number one spot at the box office, defeating Oppenheimer, Mission: Impossible – Dead Reckoning Part One and Sound of Freedom.

Following its opening weekend, Barbie surpassed The Dark Knight (2008) as the highest Monday gross ever for a Warner Bros. film, collecting a total of $26.1 million. It also quickly beat La La Land (2016) to become Gosling's highest-grossing film of all time. In its second weekend, the film earned $92 million, dropping by 43%, which was the largest sophomore weekend ever for a Warner Bros. film and the seventh-largest ever. The film remained in first place with $53 million in its third weekend, and $33.7 million in its fourth weekend. On August 16, 2023, Barbie once again surpassed The Dark Knight, this time as the highest-grossing domestic release in Warner Bros. history, having earned $537.5 million. The film was dethroned in its fifth weekend by newcomer Blue Beetle ($25 million), though it continued to hold well with a gross of $21.5 million. On August 24, 2023, Barbie surpassed The Super Mario Bros. Movie ($574 million) to become the highest-grossing film of the year in North America. Barbie finished in second place again in its sixth weekend, this time behind newcomer Gran Turismo.

==== Other territories ====
Outside of the United States and Canada, Barbie earned $194.3 million from 69 offshore markets in its opening weekend. Of the 69 markets, it was the number one film for the weekend in 58, scored the largest opening weekend for a Warner Bros. film in 26 and marked the largest opening for a 2023 film in 24. In the United Kingdom, the film opened with $24.2 million, which was the year's largest opening. In France, it opened with $10.2 million, marking the largest debut for a Warner Bros. film since Joker (2019). The following weekend, Barbie earned $127 million, dropping by just 31%. It remained the number one film of the weekend in 57 markets. Within its sophomore weekend, it became the highest-grossing film of 2023 in Brazil, as well as the highest-grossing Warner Bros. release ever. In Australia, the film scored the largest second week ever, for a running total of $30.6 million after two weekends. In the UK, Barbie began outpacing the ten-day total of Harry Potter and the Deathly Hallows – Part 2, Warner Bros.' highest-grossing film in the country, in its second weekend. In its third weekend, Barbie grossed $74 million from 69 markets for a drop of 41%. The highest-grossing overseas markets were the United Kingdom ($120.8 million), Germany ($56.5 million), Australia ($55.6 million), Mexico ($54.3 million), and France ($47.6 million). In Ireland, Barbie became the highest-grossing film in history with $9.57 million, surpassing Avatar (2009).

By contrast, in South Korea (where the film opened on July 19, 2023), Barbie underperformed at the box office. During the period between July 28 and 30, 2023, the film recorded around 81,000 admissions (earning $667,000) and finished in the fifth place in the South Korean box office, falling behind Smugglers (around 1.17 million admissions; $9.31 million), Elemental (around 360,000 admissions; $2.85 million), Mission: Impossible – Dead Reckoning Part One (around 300,000 admissions; $2.43 million) and Detective Conan: Black Iron Submarine (around 89,000 admissions; $703,000). It was suggested that the animosity against feminist messages in the film, the lack of popularity of Barbie dolls in South Korea, and cultural differences between United States and South Korea have contributed to the film's under-performance there. Film critic Youn Sung-Eun told Yonhap News Agency that 'in [South] Korea, where the recognition of feminism is not good, [people] don't want to accept that an amusement like film has a message [about social issues]', and that 'the film uses its later half to preach [about sexual discrimination], which might be hard to accept [to South Koreans]'. In an interview with The Hollywood Reporter, Kang Hye-jung, the producer of Smugglers, said "I couldn't understand why Hollywood went so wild about Barbie, perhaps because it has never been our [toy]." Writing for The Korea Times, professor emeritus Mark Peterson at Brigham Young University opined that the film under-performed in South Korea because "it was one fully-loaded package of American culture of the last 50 years, which didn't convey much meaning to [South] Korean audiences".

In Japan, Barbie ranked at no. 16. Prior to the release date, public opinion of Barbie had soured after the official Twitter account for the Barbie film had responded positively to several Barbenheimer memes, all of which depicted atomic bombing mushroom clouds comically. This was seen as an endorsement of such jokes, and, in turn, was met with disapproval from the Japanese public, who criticized their ignorance, particularly due to their negligence towards the history of the atomic bombings of Hiroshima and Nagasaki. Mitsuki Takahata, who provided Barbie's voice in the Japanese dub of the film, stated on her Instagram account that she was disappointed and had considered dropping out of one of the film's promotional events.

In China, Barbie earned more than $32 million as of August 2023.

=== Critical response ===
Barbie attained widespread critical acclaim. (Note: Attributed to multiple references: In addition, BBC News stated that critics "broadly praised" the film.) On review aggregation website Rotten Tomatoes, 88% of 506 critics' reviews are positive, with an average rating of 8.0/10. The website's consensus reads, "Barbie is a visually dazzling comedy whose meta humor is smartly complemented by subversive storytelling." Metacritic, which uses a weighted average, assigned the film a score of 80 out of 100, based on 67 critics, indicating "generally favorable" reviews. Audiences polled by CinemaScore gave the film an average grade of "A" on an A+ to F scale, while those polled by PostTrak gave it an 89% overall positive score, with 79% saying they would definitely recommend the film.

In his review for the Chicago Tribune, Michael Phillips called Barbie "a lovely, eccentrically imaginative example of brand extension and raw, untrammeled commercialism", applauded the production design, and summed: "The crucial partnership here is the one between director and performer, Gerwig and Robbie; anything Gerwig and Baumbach's verbally dexterous script requires, from Barbie's first teardrop to the final punchline, Robbie handles with unerring precision." Richard Brody of The New Yorker called it "brilliant, beautiful and fun as hell", claiming the "giddily stylized vision of a doll coming to life makes a serious case for the art of adapting even the most sanitized I.P." and commended the "free and wild" direction as well as the "profuse and exquisite" visual aesthetics. Charlotte O'Sullivan of the Evening Standard hailed the film as "easily the comedy of the year" with a large amount of fun, where "star and producer Margot Robbie, and writer-director Greta Gerwig, have done themselves proud" with a "breezily outrageous" film "about a woman's right to be 'weird, dark and crazy'". Eileen Jones of Jacobin said that the film "manages to overcome cumbersome plotting and feminist pieties to provide a delightful spectacle of funny moments that add up to something pretty good".

In The Guardian, Peter Bradshaw awarded Barbie a three out of five stars, describing it as "beamingly affectionate and deliriously pink-themed" but "perhaps a giant two-hour commercial for a product" and highlighted Gosling as a scene-stealer, being given "all the best lines".

Lovia Gyarke of The Hollywood Reporter called the film a "tricky balancing act of corporate fealty and subversion" lauding Gerwig's direction, the set design, costumes, soundtrack and lead performances, but criticizing the "muddled politics and flat emotional landing". Variety critic Peter Debruge praised the humor for giving "permission to challenge what Barbie represents" and lauded Gosling's physical performance, but concluded that the film is "an intellectual experience, not an emotional one, grounded largely in audience nostalgia". In the Vulture component of New York, Alison Willmore commended the lead performances, particularly that of Robbie, whom she characterized "as capable of heartbreaking earnestness as humor, and who sometimes effortlessly achieved both at once", but lamented the themes of the film, opining that it "doesn't ultimately want to do much more than talk itself in circles about these themes". On a similar note, Stephanie Zacharek of Time praised Robbie's "buoyant, charming performance", Gosling's "go-for-broke" effort, and the "inventive production design", but criticized the "self aware" nature of the film especially following the first half-hour, concluding that it is a feminist film "only in the most scattershot way", and that it is not "subversive". A mixed review in Le Monde also expressed doubts about the treatment of the topical issue and found that the "doll drowned herself in kitsch derision" while GQ-France, regretting that the film did not prove as radical as might have been expected, found it was somehow a continuation of Little Women.

Camilla Long of The Times wrote that the film featured Mattel's "pink, squealing, corporate grasping", trying to be "ahead of the sexism curve", but "ended up feeling sexist itself" for its portrayal that "men are stupid, go to the gym, run everything and don't care about women, while women are sensible, striving but ultimately conflicted victims". In the review by Kyle Smith in The Wall Street Journal, he stated: "As bubbly as the film appears, its script is like a grumpier-than-average women's studies seminar", exemplified by the Mattel employee character's "long monologue on how miserable it is to be female". MovieWeb ranked it number 1 on its list of the "Best Comedy Movies of the 2020s (So Far)", writing that "Gerwig's ode to the Barbie girl and her Barbie world ... is as surprisingly modern and introspective as audiences have come to expect from her work. Scrunching 60 plus years of history into a two-hour time frame aside, this film gets straight at the heart of what it's like being a woman today while providing more than a laugh or two in the process." Chinese film critic Li Jingfei (李竞菲) praised the film's humor and criticism of patriarchy, qualifying that its themes were too often advanced by slogans rather than the experiences of its characters.

Filmmakers such as Allison Anders, Joe Dante, Drew Goddard, Chad Hartigan, Rachel Morrison and Paul Schrader also cited the film as among their favorites of 2023.

In June 2025, IndieWire ranked the film at number 46 on its list of "The 100 Best Movies of the 2020s (So Far)." In July 2025, it ranked number 84 on the "Readers' Choice" edition of The New York Times' list of "The 100 Best Movies of the 21st Century."

=== Accolades ===
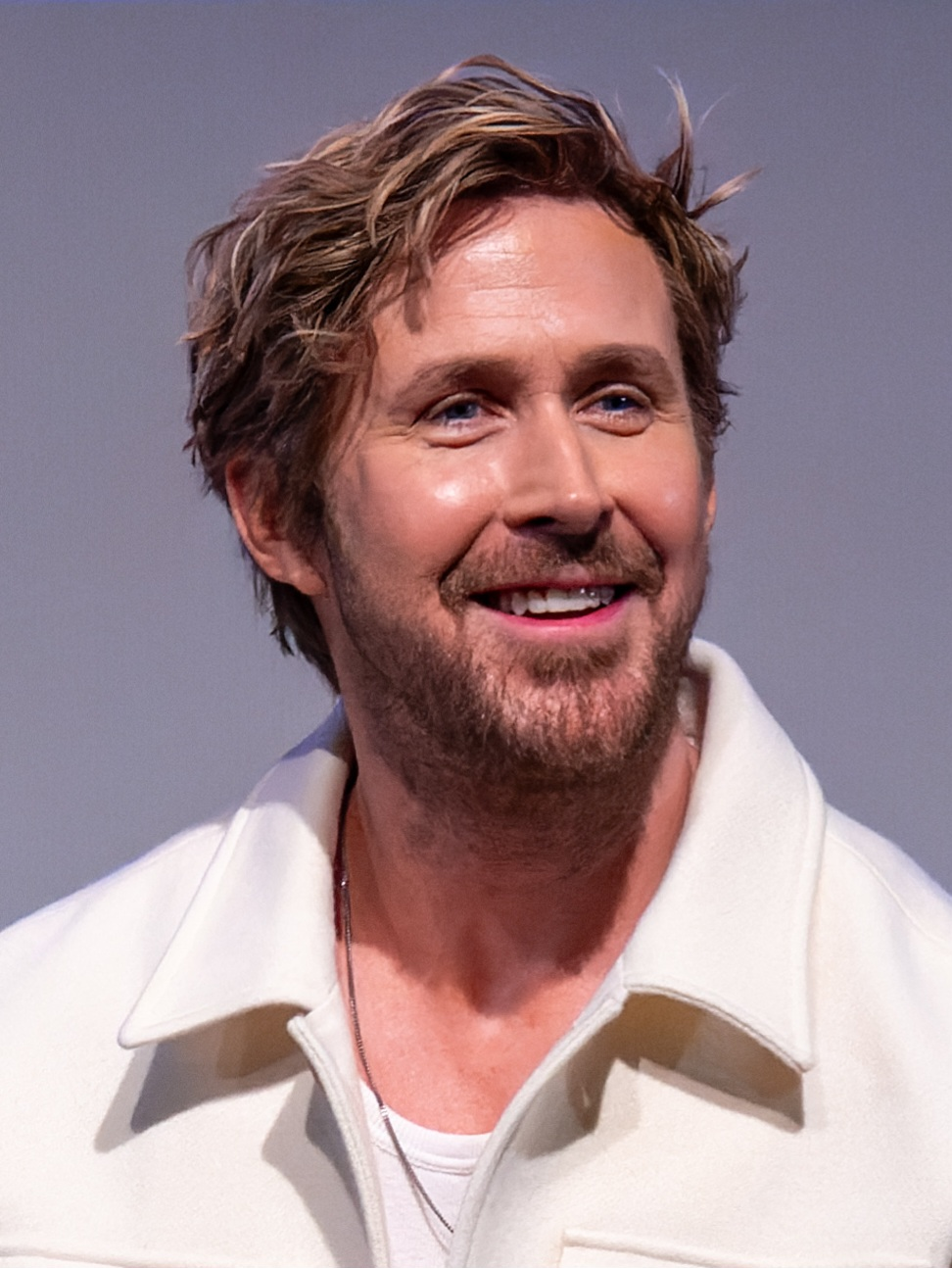
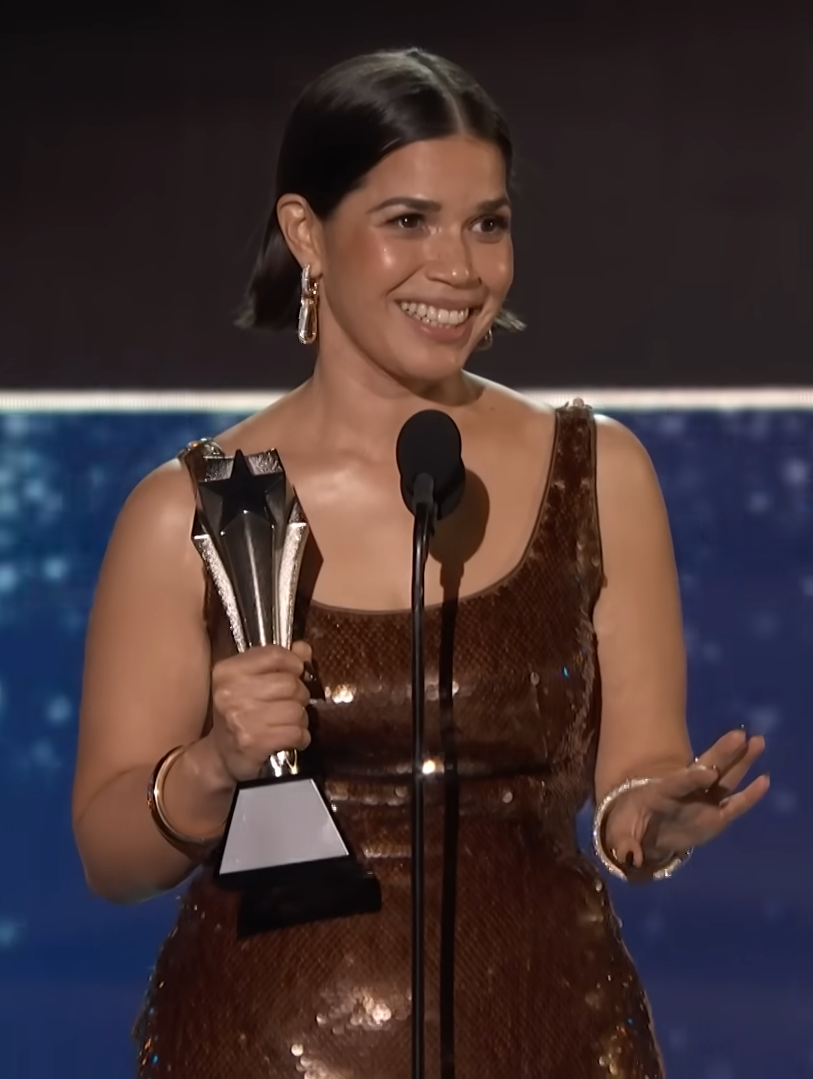
Ryan Gosling and America Ferrera earned Academy Award nominations for Best Supporting Actor and Actress for their performances.

The National Board of Review and the American Film Institute named Barbie one of the top-ten films of 2023. The film's soundtrack album and score received 12 nominations at the 66th Annual Grammy Awards, winning in three categories including Song of the Year (for "What Was I Made For?") making Barbie the first film to win the category since Titanic for "My Heart Will Go On". Barbie tied with Cabaret (1972) for the second-most nominations in Golden Globe Awards history, earning a leading nine at the 81st edition. It would ultimately win two awards at the ceremony, including Best Original Song (for "What Was I Made For?") and the inaugural Golden Globe for Cinematic and Box Office Achievement.

Earning 18 nominations at its 29th ceremony, the film received the most nominations in Critics' Choice Movie Awards history. Longlisted in 15 categories at the 77th British Academy Film Awards, Barbie (along with Oppenheimer and Killers of the Flower Moon) equaled the BAFTA longlist record for most nominations set by Edward Berger's German anti-war film All Quiet on the Western Front (2022). It also received eight nominations at the 96th Academy Awards, including Best Picture, Best Adapted Screenplay, Best Supporting Actor (Gosling), Best Supporting Actress (Ferrera) and two nominations for Best Original Song (for "I'm Just Ken" and "What Was I Made For?"). It eventually won Best Original Song for "What Was I Made For?", making singer-songwriter Billie Eilish (previous winner in the same category for James Bond's No Time To Die's theme song of the same name) the youngest two-time Academy Award winner in history, for any category.

== Future ==
=== Potential sequel ===
On July 25, 2023, following Barbie's premiere, Gerwig stated she had no plans for a sequel. On August 4, it was reported that Gerwig, co-writer Baumbach, and stars Robbie and Gosling had been contracted for only one film. On December 13, 2024, The Hollywood Reporter reported that a sequel had entered early development, with Gerwig and Baumbach set to return. Representatives for Warner Bros., Gerwig, and Baumbach denied the claim. On July 31, 2026, The New York Times reported that a sequel had entered early talks, with Robbie, Gosling, and Gerwig in negotiations to return; however, talks were stalled as David Zaslav was reportedly unwilling to pay the salaries being negotiated for their return. Additionally, Warner Bros. is reportedly scrambling to reach a deal for the potential sequel by December 2026, before the Barbie rights revert to Mattel. On August 12, 2026, Variety reported that Gerwig, Robbie, and Gosling had all rejected at least six offers from Warner Bros. for the sequel, and it was unlikely a deal would be reached before Mattel regained the Barbie rights. On September 13, 2026, Mattel Studios head Robbie Brenner expressed interest in a sequel but stated that the studio was currently more focused on developing the animated adaptation, stating, “We all want to see the Barbie sequel; I want to see it too. I’m sure at some point, one day, there will be one.” On October 2, 2026, Variety reported that David Ellison was moving forward with plans to revive the sequel following Paramount Skydance's acquisition of Warner Bros. Discovery. On November 6, 2026, America Ferrera stated in an interview with E! News: “I don’t know anything about Barbie 2. I don’t have to pretend like I don’t know anything because I actually don’t know anything.” On November 11, 2026, Variety reported that Ellison and Ynon Kreiz were pushing to finalize a deal for the sequel by the end of the year.

=== Animated adaptation ===
In July 2025, it was reported that Illumination and Mattel Studios finalized a deal to develop a theatrical animated Barbie film with Universal Pictures set to distribute. The project is not intended to be connected to the live-action film.

== See also ==
- Existentialism in film and television
- List of Barbie films
- Message picture
