= Ken (doll) =

Male counterpart to Barbie doll, introduced 1961

- Barbie character
- One of early 1960s Ken dolls wearing a swimsuit, with a box package and other accessories
- First appearance: March 11, 1961; 65 years ago
- Created by: Mattel

In-universe information
- Full name: Kenneth Sean Carson Jr.
- Nickname: Ken
- Occupation: At least 40 occupations
- Family: Kenneth Carson Sr. (father, widely unknown); Edna Carson (mother); Kenneth Carson (grandfather); Tommy Carson (younger brother); Barbie Roberts (best friend, girlfriend)

Ken Carson is a fashion doll introduced by American toy company Mattel in 1961 as the counterpart of Barbie, who had been introduced two years earlier.

Similar to Barbie, Ken is from Willows, Wisconsin, and has a fashionable line of clothing and accessories (although he made his debut wearing only a swimsuit). In the Barbie mythos, Ken met Barbie on the set of a TV commercial and is her boyfriend, per promotional box inscriptions from his debut until 2018. As of September 2022, he is perceived as one of Barbie's main friends. Since his debut, Ken has held over 40 occupations, the latest being "beach" (standing in the sand and surveying the waves), as depicted in the 2023 Barbie film, portrayed by Ryan Gosling, et al.

== History ==
Ken was introduced as the male counterpart to Barbie by the American toy company Mattel in 1961. He was named after Kenneth Handler, son of Barbie creator/inventor Ruth Handler, just as Barbie was named after her daughter. Ken Handler died in 1994 of a brain tumor.

From 1961 to the debut of Superstar Ken in 1977, Ken had straight arms that did not bend. His head could only turn left and right. Ken's hair was made of felt in his first year (known to collectors as the "flocked" hair Ken), but this was replaced with a plastic, molded hairstyle when the creators realized that the felt hair fell off when wet. Superstar Ken featured a dimpled smile, a head that could swivel, bent arms, a more muscular physique, jewelry, and underwear permanently molded to his body. Allegedly Ruth Handler built Ken's appearance in resemblance to her husband.

In February 2004, Mattel announced a split for Ken and Barbie, with Russell Arons, vice president of marketing at Mattel, saying that Barbie and Ken "feel it's time to spend some quality time – apart...Like other celebrity couples, their Hollywood romance has come to an end", though Arons indicated that the duo would "remain friends".

In February 2006, however, a revamped version of the Ken doll was launched, though it was stated that his relationship with Barbie was still purely platonic. In 2011, Mattel launched a massive campaign for Ken to win Barbie's affections back. The pair officially reunited on Valentine's Day 2011.

In 2011, Mattel introduced Japan Ken, the first Ken doll to be included in the "Dolls of the World" collection, which was formerly a Barbie-only line. The Japan Ken doll features a new face sculpt.

In 2021, Mattel announced 15 new looks for Ken. This included looks with different skin tones, body shapes and hair styles. Barbie underwent a similar makeover in 2020. Outside of this change, Ken has not changed much since he was introduced 65 years ago.

== Notable lines ==
=== Earring Magic Ken ===
In 1993, Earring Magic Ken was released. The style of the doll was thought to resemble fashions and accessories worn by some segments of the gay community at the time, and "Earring Magic Ken" subsequently attained a cult following, becoming a collector's item.

=== Sugar Daddy Ken ===
In October 2009, Mattel announced a new Palm Beach line which included a "Sugar Daddy Ken" doll aimed for adult collectors. The said line officially debuted in the spring of 2010. The line proved to be controversial, because of Ken's suggestive-sounding name. The doll had a more mature appearance and came with a West Highland Terrier puppy. Mattel defended the doll's name, saying that the puppy's name is "Sugar", thus making Ken "Sugar's Daddy". The doll's outfit resembled an outfit worn by a socialite seen in Slim Aarons' photo Palm Springs Party.

=== Other lines ===
Ken's best friend, Allan Sherwood (Midge's boyfriend, later husband), was introduced in 1964. In 1968 Brad, the first African American male doll, was introduced as the boyfriend of Barbie's African American friend, Christie, who was introduced in 1967.

== Careers ==
- Astronaut (clothing pack 1965)
- Banker (playset 1995)
- Barista (2019)
- Baseball player (clothing pack 1991)
- Basketball player (clothing pack 2021)
- Beach (2023)
- Boxer (clothing pack 1963)
- Businessman (clothing pack 1992)
- Cameraman (playset 1987)
- Coach (clothing pack 1992)
- Country Western singer (1999)
- Cowboy (Venezuela-exclusive Llanero 1989)
- Dancer (2011)
- Dentist (2020)
- Doctor (1963-1965 fashion pack,1987, 1988, clothing pack 1992, 1998, 2010, 2012)
- Dog trainer (2020)
- Drum major (clothing pack 1964)
- Farmer (2019)
- Fashion model (2003)
- Film art director (2003)
- Firefighter (2010, 2019)
- Football player (clothing pack 1992)
- Golfer (clothing pack 2019)
- Hamburger chef (clothing pack 2020)
- Movie star (1977, 1988)
- Ice skater (1990)
- Lifeguard (1995, 2019)
- Nurse (clothing pack 2021)
- Olympic athlete (Venezuela-exclusive 1988)
- Olympic figure skater (1997)
- Olympic hockey player (clothing pack 1975)
- Olympic skier (1975)
- Olympic swimmer (1975)
- Photographer (2000)
- Pilot (clothing pack 1964, clothing pack 1973, 1990, 2014)
- Pizza chef (clothing pack 2019)
- Rapper (1992)
- Referee (clothing pack 2019)
- Reporter (clothing pack 1965, 2015)
- Rock star (1987, 1989, clothing pack 1991)
- Sailor (clothing pack 1963)
- Saxophonist (clothing pack 2020)
- Science teacher (clothing pack 2020)
- Skier (clothing pack 1963)
- Snowboarder (2012)
- Soccer player (2019)
- Soda fountain worker (clothing pack 1964, 2000)
- Spy (2015)
- Starfleet command officer (1996)
- Tennis player (1979)
- United States Air Force pilot (clothing pack 1963, 1993)
- United States Air Force Thunderbirds pilot (1994)
- United States Army officer (clothing pack 1963, 1992)
- United States Marine Corps sergeant (1992)
- Wildlife veterinarian (2020)

== Criticism ==
Ken's body proportions have been described as unrealistic by scholarly studies (his chest is estimated to be about 27.5% too large for a representative human male). Unrealistic body proportions in Barbie dolls, including Ken's, have been connected to some eating disorders in children. Another controversy has also centered around the visibility (or lack of it) of Ken's male genitalia.

== Media/multimedia appearances ==
Ken has starred in various roles not disclosed by Mattel in the Barbie media franchise, including the Barbie films, Barbie: Life in the Dreamhouse, Barbie: Vlogger, Barbie Dreamhouse Adventures, Barbie's Dreamworld, Barbie: It Takes Two and Barbie: A Touch of Magic.

Billy Flanigan appeared as Ken in "Disney’s Magical World of Barbie". René Dif appeared as Ken in the music video for Aqua's "Barbie Girl".

Ken appeared in the Toy Story films from Pixar from Toy Story 2 onward. In the third film, which he appeared in as one of the henchmen of the film's villain, Lots-O'-Huggin' Bear, he was voiced by Michael Keaton.

The Caramella Girls produced their own authorized cover of Barbie Girl in 2015. The male vocalist is named Ben to rhyme with Ken, while keeping the cast distinct from the Barbie franchise.

American rapper Lil B likely named his 2017 mixtape Black Ken after Ken, as the cover art for the mixtape depicts Lil B and some of his female friends as dolls in the same style as Barbie.

Atlanta rapper Kenyatta Lee Frazier Jr., known professionally as Ken Carson, got his name from the doll as he wanted to "live better than him." Carson's debut EP, Boy Barbie, was likely based on this theming.

In 2019, Pete Davidson and Julia Fox were a part of a photo shoot in Paper magazine, where Davidson posed as Ken and Fox posed as Barbie. The photo shoot was created for the 'Break the Internet' series of the magazine, which was made popular by Kim Kardashian's popular "Champagne Incident" portrait.

Various iterations of Ken appear in the 2023 live-action Barbie film, with the lead Ken (referred to as "Beach Ken") played by Canadian actor Ryan Gosling, and others by diverse actors such as Simu Liu, Kingsley Ben-Adir, Ncuti Gatwa, Scott Evans, John Cena, Rob Brydon and Tom Stourton. Gosling received widespread critical acclaim and various accolades for his performance, including a nomination for the Academy Award for Best Supporting Actor. Songs inspired by Ken's character in the movie's soundtrack album include "Man I Am" by Sam Smith and "I'm Just Ken" by Gosling and the other Ken actors; the latter received nominations for the Golden Globe and Academy Award for Best Original Song, along with the Grammy Award for Best Song Written for Visual Media

=== Names ===
Ken is named after Ruth Handler’s son Kenneth. In the 1960s Random House books, the character's surname is given as Carson. Barbie and Ken's surnames were taken from the name of Mattel's ad agency Carson/Roberts. Ken's middle name is Sean.

== Bibliography ==
- "Barbie and Ken: History". Olsen, Eric. Blog Critics Magazine, 15 February 2004. 15 February 2004.
- "How do Barbie and Ken Measure Up?" Linda Berg-Cross, Psychotherapy Letter, April 1996, Volume 8, Issue 4, Page 3.
- History from Mattel Inc. 2001
