= Allan (Barbie) =

Character from Mattel's brand, Barbie

Allan Sherwood
- Barbie character
- Allan as portrayed by Michael Cera in the 2023 film Barbie
- First appearance: 1964
- Created by: Mattel
- Portrayed by: Michael Cera (2023 film)

In-universe information
- Full name: Allan Sherwood
- Spouses: Midge and Viky

Allan Sherwood is a fictional character from the Mattel brand Barbie. He was introduced in 1964 as Ken's friend.

== History ==
Allan was named after the son-in-law of Mattel co-founder Ruth Handler. The first Allan doll was released in 1964. He was marketed as Ken's friend who could also fit into Ken's clothes. In 1991, the spelling of his name was changed to Alan. The Wedding Day Alan doll featured Alan marrying Barbie's friend Midge. The doll was also part of the Wedding Party Midge Gift Set. Festa de Casamento Alan ("Wedding Party Alan") was released in Brazil, but he was marrying a character named Viky. It was manufactured by Estrela Toys under license from Mattel.

In 1992, Alan and Midge dolls were featured in booklets holding baby twins. They were wearing casual, matching outfits, with Midge holding their baby girl and Alan holding their baby boy. Under the dolls, a caption read, "Midge® and Alan™ have adorable twin babies that magically hold their bottle and toy." The dolls were not released.

In December 2002, the Barbie Happy Family line included Alan, his pregnant wife Midge, and their son Ryan. Alan was sold with Ryan and a stroller. The line included white and African-American versions of the dolls. Barbie.com said that the pregnant Midge doll was "a wonderful prop for parents to use with their children to role-play family situations". Jo Ann Farver, a psychologist from the University of Southern California, was interviewed and said, "The pregnancy-themed Happy Family dolls complement children's strong interests in family relationships and supports their social and emotional development". Midge's pregnancy was so controversial that Walmart stopped selling all of the Happy Family dolls, including Ryan, two weeks before Christmas. Melissa Berryhill, a spokeswoman for Walmart, said, "Customers said they were not happy with the pregnant Midge doll so Walmart removed the entire Happy Family set".

In 2004, more Alan and Ryan dolls were released. The theme was the first birthday of Alan and Midge's baby, Nikki. The Happy Family Hometown Fair Gift Set was also released. It included Alan, Midge, Ryan, and Nikki. Happy Family Shopping Fun Midge, Nikki & Baby showed that Alan and Midge had had another baby after Nikki.

Allan was featured in the 2023 Barbie film adaptation, played by Michael Cera. He has no interaction with the pregnant Midge character, or any apparent relationship with her.

== Dolls ==
- 1964 - Allan Doll: "Allan™ - HE'S KEN'S® BUDDY™ - BY MATTEL® - ALL OF KEN'S CLOTHES FIT HIM!" (straight legs)
- 1965 - Allan Doll: "Allan™ WITH ‟LIFELIKE” BENDABLE LEGS"
- 1991 - Wedding Day Alan: "He's marrying Barbie® doll's best friend Midge®!"
- 1991 - Wedding Party Midge Gift Set
- 2002 - Happy Family Alan & Ryan Dolls [White] [With stroller. There is also a second edition with Midge and baby cardboard cutout inside]
- 2002 - Happy Family Alan & Ryan Dolls [African-American] [With stroller. There is also a second edition with Midge and baby cardboard cutout inside]
- 2004 - Happy Family Alan & Ryan Dolls [White] [Nikki's birthday]
- 2004 - Happy Family Alan & Ryan Dolls [African-American] [Nikki's birthday]
- 2004 - Happy Family Hometown Fair Gift Set [White]
- 2004 - Happy Family Hometown Fair Gift Set [African-American]
- 2008 - Campus Sweet Shop Midge Doll and Allan Doll Giftset
- 2014 - Double Date 50th Anniversary Giftset
- 2024 - 60th Anniversary Reproduction
- 2025 - Family & Friends

== Outfits ==
- 1965 - Allan Doll Original Swimsuit
- 1966 - Best Man
- 2003 - Happy Family Neighborhood Fashions
