= Emerald Fennell =

English filmmaker, actress, writer (born 1985)

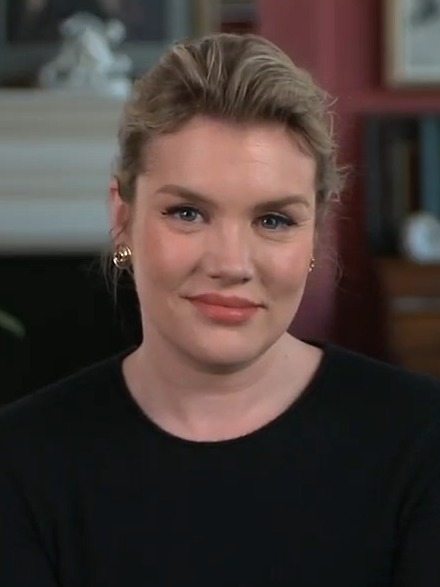
- Fennell in 2023
- Born: Emerald Lilly Fennell; 1 October 1985 (age 41); London, England
- Education: Greyfriars, Oxford (BA)
- Occupations: Actress; filmmaker; writer
- Years active: 2007–present
- Spouse: Chris Vernon
- Children: 2
- Relatives: Theo Fennell (father)

Emerald Lilly Fennell (/fɪˈnɛl/; born 1 October 1985) is an English actress, filmmaker, and writer. She has received numerous accolades, including an Academy Award, two BAFTA Awards, and nominations for three Primetime Emmy Awards, three Golden Globe Awards, and a Grammy Award.

Fennell first gained attention for her roles in period films, such as Albert Nobbs (2011), Anna Karenina (2012), and The Danish Girl (2015). She gained prominence for her starring role in the BBC One drama series Call the Midwife (2013–2017) and for her portrayal of Camilla Parker-Bowles in the Netflix drama series The Crown (2019–2020), the latter of which garnered her a Primetime Emmy Award nomination.

As a writer-director, Fennell is known as the showrunner for season two of the BBC spy thriller series Killing Eve (2019), which earned her two Primetime Emmy Award nominations. She made her feature film directorial debut with the thriller Promising Young Woman (2020), for which she won the Academy Award for Best Original Screenplay, and received nominations for Best Picture and Best Director. She also wrote the book for Andrew Lloyd Webber's musical Cinderella (2021). Fennell went on to direct the psychological thriller Saltburn (2023) and the period romance Wuthering Heights (2026).

== Early life and education ==
Fennell was born in Hammersmith in London to jewellery designer Theo Fennell and author Louise Fennell (née MacGregor). Her sister, Coco Fennell, is a fashion designer.

Fennell was educated at Marlborough College, a prestigious public school in Marlborough, Wiltshire. She studied English at Greyfriars, Oxford, where she acted in university plays. Fennell was, writes journalist K.J. Yossman, "part of a rarefied...social set whose family names I recognized from gossip columns and history books… Balfour, Frost, von Bismarck, Guinness, Shaffer." At Oxford, Fennell was spotted by Lindy King of United Agents.

== Career ==
=== 2007–2012: Early acting roles ===
While acting in a student play at Oxford, Fennell was recruited by Lindy King, a talent agent that represents names such as Keira Knightley. In 2007, Fennell made her acting debut in an episode of the crime drama series Trial & Retribution. In 2008, Fennell was commissioned to write a film script, co-produced by Madeleine Lloyd Webber. Titled Chukka, it was a romantic comedy about a group of teenagers who fight the closure of their school by taking on the rich kids at polo. She went on to guest star in episodes of the comedy drama New Tricks and the period drama Any Human Heart, both in 2010. Also that year, she made her feature film debut in the crime drama Mr Nice.

Fennell starred as Agnes in the Channel 4 sitcom Chickens (2011–2013), alongside Simon Bird, Joe Thomas and Jonny Sweet. She also had supporting roles in a number of period drama films, including Albert Nobbs (2011), where she met fellow actor Phoebe Waller-Bridge, and Anna Karenina (2012).

=== 2013–2019: Rise to prominence ===
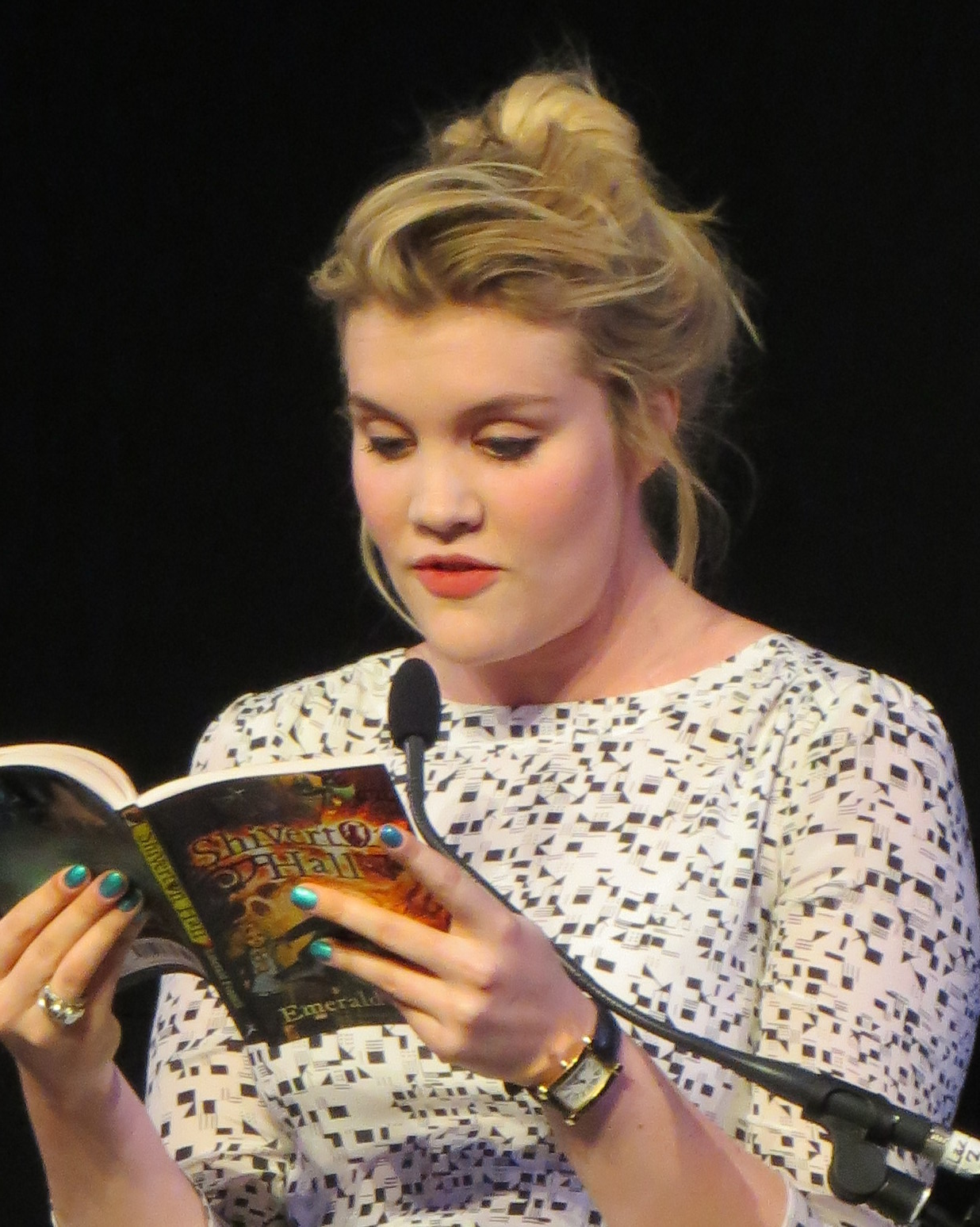
Fennell at a public reading of Shiverton Hall in 2013

In 2013, Fennell appeared in the comedy series Blandings and the television film The Lady Vanishes. She then gained prominence for her starring role as Nurse Patsy Mount in the BBC One period drama series Call the Midwife (2013–2017), dyeing her blonde hair red for the role. Fennell's first novel, a children's fantasy titled Shiverton Hall, was published by Bloomsbury Children's Books in January 2013. It was first released as an ebook by Bloomsbury USA in December 2012. A sequel, titled The Creeper, was published mid-2014. ISFDB catalogues them as the Shiverton Hall series. The novel was shortlisted for the Waterstones Children's Book Prize in 2014. She then released the novel Monsters in September 2015, her first adult horror book. Also in 2015, she appeared in the period drama film The Danish Girl and the fantasy film Pan.

In 2016, Fennell wrote two episodes of the sitcom Drifters and also appeared in an episode as Lizzie. She then guest starred as Ada Lovelace in an episode of the period drama series Victoria (2017) and appeared as Vanessa Bell in the film Vita & Virginia (2018).

In July 2018, it was announced that Fennell was hired by her close friend Phoebe Waller-Bridge as head writer for the second series of the BBC spy thriller series Killing Eve, replacing Waller-Bridge, who remained as a producer. Fennell wrote six episodes for the series and also became one of the show's executive producers. Speaking to The New York Times, Fennell said "Phoebe [Waller-Bridge] and I had worked together in the past, and we've been friends for nearly 10 years. We met on a film — Albert Nobbs — which we both had tiny parts in. I started in the very early days as a writer in the Season 2 writer's room. Because it's such an unusual show, they did a very loose writers' room for a week just to see, and then wonderfully and luckily for me they promoted me to head writer." The second season began broadcast in April 2019. At the 71st Primetime Emmy Awards, Fennell was nominated for the Primetime Emmy Award for Outstanding Drama Series as a producer and the Primetime Emmy Award for Outstanding Writing for a Drama Series for the episode "Nice and Neat".

On 23 October 2018, it was announced that Fennell would play Camilla Shand in the third season of the Netflix period drama series The Crown. She continued playing the role in the fourth season, which earned her a nomination for the Primetime Emmy Award for Outstanding Supporting Actress in a Drama Series.

=== 2020–present: Breakthrough and expansion ===
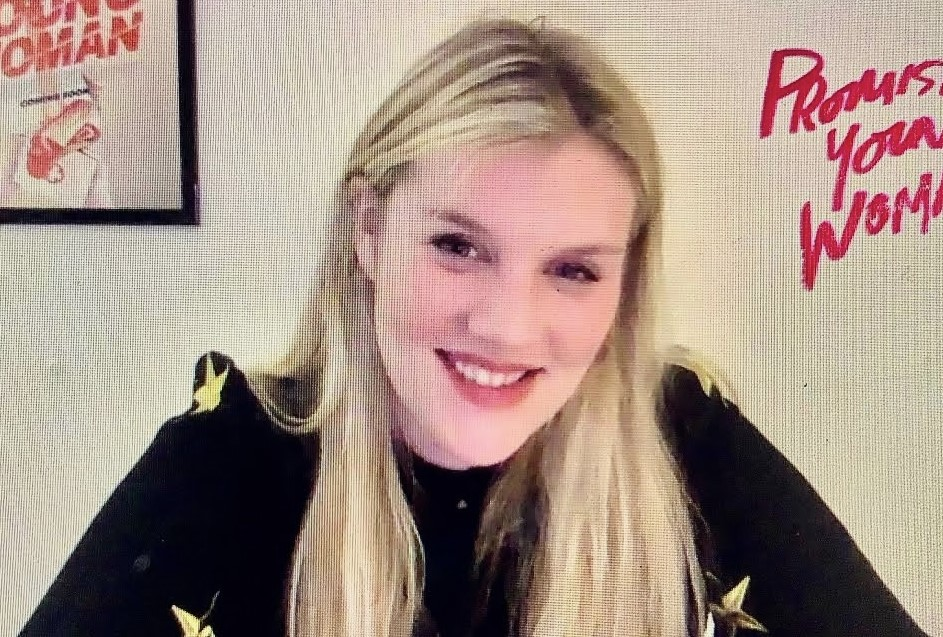
Fennell in an interview for her film Promising Young Woman in 2020

In January 2019, it was announced Fennell would produce, write and direct the comedy thriller film Promising Young Woman, starring Carey Mulligan. Production began in March 2019. Fennell was seven months pregnant during the 23-day shoot. About her initial concept for the film, Fennell stated that she imagined, "...a scene of a drunk girl on a bed, being undressed, saying "What are you doing?" incredibly drunkenly and then sitting up sober. From that moment, I knew roughly what it was going to be." The movie premiered at the 2020 Sundance Film Festival to critical acclaim with, as of August 2023, a 90% score on Rotten Tomatoes, and a critical consensus of: "A boldly provocative, timely thriller, Promising Young Woman is an auspicious feature debut for writer-director Emerald Fennell -- and a career highlight for Carey Mulligan."

Even so, the film was notable for its controversial ending, to which Fennell stated, "The original ending was deemed too bleak, and normally, I wouldn't care about being too bleak. But the point was made to me [by the studio]. There comes a point where something can be so enraging to an audience that people won't want to watch it." Fennell made a brief uncredited appearance in the film as the host of a 'blowjob lip' make-up tutorial video. She also produced the film with, amongst others, Margot Robbie and her LuckyChap Entertainment production company. The film went on to earn five Academy Award nominations, including Best Picture, Best Director, and Best Original Screenplay for Fennell. She became one of only seven women, and the first British woman, to earn a nomination in the directing category. As well, Fennell's directing nomination alongside that of Chloé Zhao marked the first instance of two women earning directing nominations in the same year. For the film, she received Best Original Screenplay awards at the Critics Choice Awards, the Writers Guild of America Awards, and the Academy Awards.

In January 2020, Andrew Lloyd Webber announced he would collaborate with Fennell on the musical Cinderella, which opened in London in August 2021. The West End production received generally positive reviews from critics. It made the transfer to Broadway in 2023, titled Bad Cinderella, with Fennell's original book adapted by playwright Alexis Scheer. Naveen Kumar for Variety criticised the revised book, writing, "[it's] an illogical head-scratcher, despite being based on a story most everyone knows". The show closed in June 2023.

On 22 March 2021, Fennell was attached to write a Zatanna film for Warner Brothers, set in the DC Extended Universe. On 18 May 2021, Mark Millar revealed that Fennell had written the latest screenplay of the film adaptation of his comic Nemesis. In 2023, Fennell told The New Yorker Radio Hour that she is no longer attached to either film. About Zatanna, Fennell later confessed, "It was a script reflective of a woman in the middle of a nervous breakdown... it was maybe too far away from the (superhero) genre... It was really dark." In July 2022, Cuban-Spanish actress Ana de Armas stated in an interview with Elle that Fennell was hired to contribute to the script of the John Wick spin-off film Ballerina as one of its writers. The film was released in June 2025.

In 2023, Fennell wrote, produced, and directed her second feature film, Saltburn, a black comedy and psychological thriller starring Barry Keoghan, Jacob Elordi, Rosamund Pike, Richard E. Grant, Alison Oliver and Archie Madekwe. The film premiered at the 50th Telluride Film Festival. It received generally positive reviews, with critics praising the performances and cinematography while criticising its ending. On Rotten Tomatoes, the film's critical consensus states, "Emerald Fennell's candy-coated and incisive Saltburn is a debauched jolt to the senses that will be invigorating for most." The film was shot using a 1.33:1 aspect ratio, usually used in silent films. About her inspiration for Saltburn, Fennell stated, "So much of this film, and so much of everything I make, is me trying to come to terms with what an embarrassing person I am [and] what embarrassing people we all are." In producing Saltburn, Fennell specified, "All the editing was in Soho, London, and then we did sound editorial at Cinphonic, ADR at Goldcrest, the score was done at Air Studios and the re-recording mix in Dolby Atmos was at Pinewood. I love the whole post-process, especially the editing." That same year, Fennell also played the role of Midge in Greta Gerwig's fantasy comedy film Barbie.

In July 2024, she announced that her next film would be an adaptation of Emily Brontë's novel Wuthering Heights. Later that year, it was announced that Margot Robbie and Jacob Elordi would be starring as Cathy and Heathcliff respectively. Fennell asked Elordi to play Heathcliff after seeing him on the set of Saltburn one day, as he "looked exactly like the illustration of Heathcliff in the first book that I read." The casting was widely criticised online due to Robbie being cast as a teenage protagonist and Elordi playing a role described as "dark-skinned" in the original novel. In talking about her goals for the film, Fennell stated, "I wanted to make something that made me feel like I felt when I first read it, which means that it's an emotional response to something. It's, like, primal, sexual." Wuthering Heights was released in February 2026 to mixed reviews.

== Personal life ==
Fennell's husband is film and advertising director and producer Chris Vernon. The couple have two children, the elder of whom is a son who was born in 2019. She revealed that she was pregnant with their second child at the 93rd Academy Awards in April 2021.

== Filmography ==
=== Feature film ===
Year	Title	Director	Writer	Producer
2020	Promising Young Woman	Yes	Yes	Yes
2023	Saltburn	Yes	Yes	Yes
2026	Wuthering Heights	Yes	Yes	Yes

Short film

Year	Title	Director	Writer
2018	Careful How You Go	Yes	Yes

Acting roles

Year	Title	Role	Notes
2010	Mr Nice	Rachel	
2011	Albert Nobbs	Mrs Smythe-Willard	
2012	Anna Karenina	Princess Merkalova	
2015	The Danish Girl	Elsa	
2015	Pan	Commander	
2018	Vita & Virginia	Vanessa Bell	
2020	Promising Young Woman	Video Tutorial Host	Cameo
2023	Barbie	Midge	

=== Television ===
Year	Title	Writer	Executive Producer	Notes
2016	Drifters	Yes	No	2 episodes
2019	Killing Eve	Yes	Yes	8 episodes

Acting roles

Year	Title	Role	Notes
2007	Trial & Retribution	Sheena	Episode: "Sins of the Father - Part 1"
2010	New Tricks	Vicky the Receptionist	Episode: "Coming Out Ball"
2010	Any Human Heart	Lottie	3 episodes
2011–2013	Chickens	Agnes	7 episodes
2013	Blandings	Monica Simmons	Episode: "Problems with Drink"
2013	The Lady Vanishes	Odette	Television film
2013	Murder on the Home Front	Issy Quennell	Television film
2013–2017	Call the Midwife	Nurse Patsy Mount	27 episodes
2016	Drifters	Lizzie	Episode: "Halloween"
2017	Victoria	Ada Lovelace	Episode: "The Green Eyed Monster"
2019–2020	The Crown	Camilla Parker Bowles	7 episodes

=== Theatre ===
Year	Title	Credit	Venue
2021–2022	Cinderella	Book by	Gillian Lynne Theatre, West End
2023	Bad Cinderella	Original story and book by	Imperial Theatre, Broadway

== Awards and nominations ==
Award	Year	Category	Work	Result	Ref.
AACTA Awards	2021	Best Film	Promising Young Woman	Won	
AACTA Awards	2021	Best Direction	Promising Young Woman	Nominated	
AACTA Awards	2021	Best Screenplay	Promising Young Woman	Nominated	
Academy Awards	2021	Best Picture	Promising Young Woman	Nominated	
Academy Awards	2021	Best Director	Promising Young Woman	Nominated	
Academy Awards	2021	Best Original Screenplay	Promising Young Woman	Won	
Alliance of Women Film Journalists	2021	Best Director	Promising Young Woman	Nominated	
Alliance of Women Film Journalists	2021	Best Writing, Original Screenplay	Promising Young Woman	Won	
Alliance of Women Film Journalists	2021	Best Woman Director	Promising Young Woman	Won	
Alliance of Women Film Journalists	2021	Best Woman Screenwriter	Promising Young Woman	Nominated	
Alliance of Women Film Journalists	2024	Best Woman Director	Saltburn	Nominated	
Alliance of Women Film Journalists	2024	Best Woman Screenwriter	Saltburn	Nominated	
Amanda Awards	2021	Best Foreign Feature Film	Promising Young Woman	Nominated	
Austin Film Critics Association	2021	Best Director	Promising Young Woman	Nominated	
Austin Film Critics Association	2021	Best Original Screenplay	Promising Young Woman	Nominated	
British Academy Film Awards	2021	Best Film	Promising Young Woman	Nominated	
British Academy Film Awards	2021	Best Original Screenplay	Promising Young Woman	Won	
British Academy Film Awards	2021	Outstanding British Film	Promising Young Woman	Won	
British Academy Film Awards	2024	Outstanding British Film	Saltburn	Nominated	
Chicago Film Critics Association	2020	Best Director	Promising Young Woman	Nominated	
Chicago Film Critics Association	2020	Best Original Screenplay	Promising Young Woman	Nominated	
Chicago Film Critics Association	2020	Milos Stehlik Award for Promising Filmmaker	Promising Young Woman	Won	
Critics' Choice Movie Awards	2021	Best Director	Promising Young Woman	Nominated	
Critics' Choice Movie Awards	2021	Best Original Screenplay	Promising Young Woman	Won	
Dallas–Fort Worth Film Critics Association	2021	Best Director	Promising Young Woman	Nominated	
Dallas–Fort Worth Film Critics Association	2021	Best Screenplay	Promising Young Woman	Won	
Detroit Film Critics Society	2021	Best Original Screenplay	Promising Young Woman	Nominated	
Directors Guild of America Awards	2021	Outstanding Directing – Feature Film	Promising Young Woman	Nominated	
Dorian Awards	2021	Best Film	Promising Young Woman	Nominated	
Dorian Awards	2021	Best Director	Promising Young Woman	Nominated	
Dorian Awards	2021	Screenplay of the Year	Promising Young Woman	Won	
Dublin Film Critics' Circle	2021	Best Director	Promising Young Woman	Nominated	
Dublin Film Critics' Circle	2021	Best Screenplay	Promising Young Woman	Nominated	
European Film Awards	2021	European Discovery – Prix FIPRESCI	Promising Young Woman	Won	
Florida Film Critics Circle	2020	Best Original Screenplay	Promising Young Woman	Nominated	
Georgia Film Critics Association	2021	Best Director	Promising Young Woman	Nominated	
Georgia Film Critics Association	2021	Best Original Screenplay	Promising Young Woman	Won	
Georgia Film Critics Association	2021	Breakthrough Award	Promising Young Woman	Won	
Golden Globe Awards	2021	Best Director – Motion Picture	Promising Young Woman	Nominated	
Golden Globe Awards	2021	Best Screenplay – Motion Picture	Promising Young Woman	Nominated	
Grammy Awards	2025	Best Compilation Soundtrack for Visual Media	Saltburn	Nominated	
Hollywood Creative Alliance	2021	Best Female Director	Promising Young Woman	Nominated	
Hollywood Creative Alliance	2021	Best Original Screenplay	Promising Young Woman	Won	
Hollywood Creative Alliance	2021	Best First Feature	Promising Young Woman	Won	
Hollywood Creative Alliance	2021	Filmmaker on the Rise	—N/a	Won	
Hollywood Creative Alliance	2024	Best Director	Saltburn	Nominated	
Hollywood Creative Alliance	2024	Best Original Screenplay	Saltburn	Nominated	
Houston Film Critics Society	2021	Best Director	Promising Young Woman	Nominated	
Houston Film Critics Society	2021	Best Screenplay	Promising Young Woman	Won	
Independent Spirit Awards	2021	Best Director	Promising Young Woman	Nominated	
Independent Spirit Awards	2021	Best Screenplay	Promising Young Woman	Won	
Los Angeles Film Critics Association	2020	Best Screenplay	Promising Young Woman	Won	
Mill Valley Film Festival	2023	Filmmaker of the Year	Saltburn	Won	
Nashville Film Festival	2018	Best Narrative Short Film	Careful How You Go	Nominated	
New York Film Critics Online	2021	Best Screenplay	Promising Young Woman	Won	
New York Film Critics Online	2021	Best Debut as Director	Promising Young Woman	Won	
Online Film Critics Society	2021	Best Director	Promising Young Woman	Nominated	
Online Film Critics Society	2021	Best Original Screenplay	Promising Young Woman	Won	
Online Film Critics Society	2021	Best Debut	Promising Young Woman	Won	
Primetime Emmy Awards	2019	Outstanding Drama Series	Killing Eve	Nominated	
Primetime Emmy Awards	2019	Outstanding Writing for a Drama Series	Killing Eve (Episode: "Nice and Neat")	Nominated	
Primetime Emmy Awards	2021	Outstanding Supporting Actress in a Drama Series	The Crown	Nominated	
Producers Guild of America Awards	2021	Best Theatrical Motion Picture	Promising Young Woman	Nominated	
Robert Awards	2022	Best English Language Film	Promising Young Woman	Nominated	
San Diego Film Critics Society	2021	Best Original Screenplay	Promising Young Woman	Nominated	
San Francisco Bay Area Film Critics Circle	2021	Best Director	Promising Young Woman	Nominated	
San Francisco Bay Area Film Critics Circle	2021	Best Original Screenplay	Promising Young Woman	Nominated	
Satellite Awards	2021	Auteur Award	Promising Young Woman	Won	
Satellite Awards	2021	Best Original Screenplay	Promising Young Woman	Won	
Savannah Film Festival	2023	Audience Award	Saltburn	Won	
Screen Actors Guild Awards	2021	Outstanding Performance by an Ensemble in a Drama Series	The Crown	Won	
Seattle Film Critics Society	2021	Best Director	Promising Young Woman	Nominated	
Seattle Film Critics Society	2021	Best Screenplay	Promising Young Woman	Won	
St. Louis Film Critics Association	2021	Best Director	Promising Young Woman	Nominated	
St. Louis Film Critics Association	2021	Best Original Screenplay	Promising Young Woman	Won	
Sundance Film Festival	2018	Short Film Grand Jury Prize	Careful How You Go	Nominated	
USC Scripter Awards	2020	Television	Killing Eve (Episode: "Nice and Neat")	Nominated	
Vancouver Film Critics Circle	2021	Best Screenplay	Promising Young Woman	Nominated	
Washington D.C. Area Film Critics Association	2021	Best Director	Promising Young Woman	Nominated	
Washington D.C. Area Film Critics Association	2021	Best Original Screenplay	Promising Young Woman	Won	
Women Film Critics Circle	2023	Best Movie by a Woman	Saltburn	Runner-up	
Women Film Critics Circle	2023	Best Woman Storyteller	Saltburn	Nominated	
Writers Guild of America Awards	2021	Best Original Screenplay	Promising Young Woman	Won	
Writers' Guild of Great Britain	2022	Best First Screenplay	Promising Young Woman	Won	
NTFCA Award	2023	Best Director	Saltburn	Nominated	
EDA Female Focus Award	2023	Best Woman Director	Saltburn	Nominated	
EDA Female Focus Award	2023	Best Woman Screenwriter	Saltburn	Nominated	
DFCS Award	2024	Best Original Screenplay	Saltburn	Nominated	
DFCS Award	2024	Best Director	Saltburn	Nominated	
LEJA Award	2024	Best Original Screenplay	Saltburn	Nominated	
Music+Sound Award	2024	Best Sync in Film	Saltburn	Won	
OFTA Film Award	2024	Best Original Screenplay	Saltburn	Nominated	

== See also ==
- List of Academy Award winners and nominees from Great Britain

== Bibliography ==
- Shiverton Hall. A&C Black. 2013. ISBN 978-1-4088-2778-9.
- Shiverton Hall: The Creeper. A&C Black. 2014. ISBN 978-1-4088-2779-6.
- Fennell, Emerald (2014). Rollercoasters Shiverton Hall. Oxford University Press. ISBN 978-0-19-834086-7.
- Fennell, Emerald (2015). Monsters. Hot Key Books. ISBN 978-1-4714-0462-7.
- Fennell, Emerald (2026). Emerald Fennell Presents: Wuthering Heights. ISBN 978-1-6682-3682-6.
