= 2023 Academy Awards =

2023 Academy Awards may refer to:

- 95th Academy Awards, the Academy Awards ceremony that took place in 2023, honoring the best in film for 2022
- 96th Academy Awards, the Academy Awards ceremony that took place in 2024, honoring the best in film for 2023
