= Midge (Barbie) =

Doll in the Barbie line

Midge Hadley
- Barbie character
- The controversial "pregnant" Midge doll
- First appearance: 1963
- Created by: Mattel
- Portrayed by: Emerald Fennell (2023 film)
- Voiced by: Ashlyn Madden (Barbie: Life in the Dreamhouse)

In-universe information
- Full name: Midge Hadley Sherwood
- Nickname: Midge

Midge Hadley Sherwood is a doll character in the Barbie line of toys by Mattel that was first released in 1963. She was marketed as Barbie's best friend.

Although created at the same time as Skipper, Midge was re-introduced in 1988 as part of the play line, though two vintage re-production dolls were made specifically for collectors in 1993 and 1998. These dolls were typically redheaded, freckled and blue-eyed.

Also in the period, Wedding Day Midge was sold, with the groom being Allan Sherwood, who had been marketed as Midge's boyfriend in the earlier years. The two had three children named Ryan, Nikki and Cassandra; they also had twins who were not introduced. This was known as the Happy Family line and, in the set, Midge was sold "pregnant" with Nikki as a newborn baby. The Happy Family product became the subject of controversy when some parents disliked the "pregnant" Midge toy because they believed that Midge was too young to have children.

In 2013, Mattel decided to revamp Midge's history, reintroducing her as a best friend of Barbie's, but unmarried, without any children nor connection to Allan.

== History ==
=== Vintage years ===
When Barbie debuted, she was the subject of a lot of criticism, some of which claimed Barbie was too mature-looking for children. Midge was the first same-size friend of Barbie and was created to oppose these controversies. She had a fuller, gentler face mold, although her body proportions were the same as Barbie's and they both stood at 11 1/2 inches (290 mm) tall. This allowed the two dolls to be able to share clothes and accessories. Her head mold was stamped "1958", the same as Barbie's. When Midge arrived, the markings on the straight leg body mold they shared changed to include both her and Barbie. Midge had shoulder-length hair that flipped at the ends. Buyers had an option of buying a doll with one of three different hair colors: red, blonde, or brunette. Her face was usually brushed with freckles. The dolls that were sold without freckles had a longer hairstyle and are now hard to find. Depending on the doll's hair color, the color of her two-piece swimming suit varied. If Midge had red hair, her swimsuit was yellow and orange; for blond hair, it was in two shades of blue, and if she was brunette, it was pink and red. The first vintage Midge dolls had a value of $175 MIB (Mint In Box) in 2007.

For the first two years, she had "straight legs" that could not bend at the knee. A rare Midge with teeth was sold the first year and is now sought after by collectors. One year later, in 1964, the dolls that were sold had slightly longer hair. Midge's boyfriend Allan arrived as well. Early in 1965, Wigs Wardrobe Midge was sold, and consisted of a Midge head with short molded hair and three wigs. This was the Midge counterpart of the Fashion Queen Barbie. Since she came with only a head, another doll had to provide for the body. In 1965, Midge with bendable legs was introduced. She had shorter "bobbed" hair, like the American Girl Barbie, with a blue headband. Her swimsuit was different as well, and was now one-piece and striped.

There was also a Japanese exclusive Midge only offered in Japan in the years 1963 and 1964. These dolls were similar to a fashion queen in that they had molded hair, but a very different face mold and more of a bouffant-shaped head.

=== Return ===
A 35th anniversary Midge reproduction doll, produced for collectors.

From her introduction until 1967, Midge was marketed as Barbie's original best friend, but no dolls were sold for about 20 years until 1988, when California Dream Midge was sold as part of a beach line, which used the "Steffie" mold. The same "Steffie" mold was used for Cool Times Midge in 1989. In 1990, she began to use the "Diva" mold for All Stars Midge and The Beat Midge. In 1991, she was married to Allan (now spelled "Alan"). Before and after the Wedding Day Midge doll was sold, many Midge play line dolls were produced. Before Wedding Day Midge, Midge dolls still had freckles, but up until Hawaii Midge was sold in 1999, the dolls lacked freckles. Most of the dolls were red-haired with blue or green eyes, but some dolls were brunette. The most commonly used head mold for Midge in this period was the "Diva" mold, stamped 1985.

A 35th anniversary Midge reproduction doll was sold in 1998 for collectors, made to look like the vintage Midge dolls. She had red hair, was dressed in her original orange and lime two-piece swimming suit, and came with a reproduction of the Senior Prom outfit from 1964–1965 as well as a reproduction of the box the Midge dolls originally came in. Earlier in 1993, for Midge's 30th anniversary, a Midge reproduction doll was also produced, but she did not possess a reproduction of her original swimsuit or the original box. Like the later version, she came in a reproduction of the Senior Prom outfit.

In 2013, Midge appeared on the webseries Barbie: Life in the Dreamhouse where it is revealed that she has moved to Malibu. With this, her canon has been changed extensively, and she is a teenager who is retro at heart and still uses old-fangled terms. The whole Happy Family canon has been dropped altogether due to controversy. Two Midge dolls were released in 2013, one as part of a collectors' set with Barbie, and the other on her own in the Life in the Dreamhouse doll line.

=== Happy Family line ===
The year after Midge and Alan were married, a picture of the couple with twin babies was shown in a pamphlet, but the dolls were never produced. However, in 2003, she and Alan were re-introduced with a family consisting of them and three different kids, including three-year-old Ryan and newborn baby Nikki. This was known as the Happy Family line, and was similar to the discontinued Heart Family line of the 1980s. The dolls came in both White American and African American versions. This was the first time an African-American Midge was ever produced.

Midge was sold "pregnant" with Nikki, who was a tiny baby inside Midge's magnetic removable womb. This led to some controversy with some consumers saying that the doll was inappropriate for children, or that it promoted teen pregnancy. Another cause for this controversy was that Midge did not initially have a wedding ring, but this was later fixed. She was also packaged without Alan. Customers' complaints about the doll led to Walmart pulling the Happy Family line off their shelves. A new version of this Midge was produced for Walmart. In this version, she was not pregnant and was accompanied by a cardboard cut-out display of Alan and Ryan standing next to her inside the box. The Happy Family Line included everything from a talking house, a backyard swimming pool, neighborhood market, and playground.

Later, around Nikki's first birthday, Midge was "pregnant" again with another child, who was neither named nor given a specific gender, as the gender was a surprise when the owner opened the doll's box. Midge's new baby was later named Cassandra. Midge has two known parents who are simply called "Grandpa" and "Grandma". At first, the grandparent dolls were sold together as part of a big set consisting of the dolls and a kitchen play set, but for Nikki's first birthday, they were sold separately. Midge, Alan, and Ryan gave Nikki a dog for her birthday. They also came in both White and African American versions. They use different body molds to reflect their age.

== Head molds ==
- Midge's first appearance was made with her own head mold, Vintage Midge.
- During 1964-65, the Japanese exclusive "new Midge" face mold was released and was only offered in Japan.
- Midge next used the Steffie head mold until the first introduction of Teresa, which took over the Steffie head.
- Later, Midge used the Diva head mold from the "Barbie and the Rockers" set.
- One version of the Florida Vacation Midge uses the Diva sculpt, while an alternative version used the Mackie head mold.
- Midge returned to the Steffie head mold for the 50-year anniversary version.

== In other media ==
- Midge appears in the web series Barbie: Life in the Dreamhouse in the episode "A Smidge of Midge", voiced by Ashlyn Madden.
- The Happy Family pregnant version of Midge was satirized in Season 10 of Robot Chicken, where she was sent to the Island of Recalled Toys.
- British actress Emerald Fennell portrays Midge in the 2023 live-action film Barbie, based on the pregnant version of the doll.
