= Caitlyn Bairstow =

Canadian actress

- Born: Vancouver, British Columbia, Canada
- Education: BCIT
- Occupation: Voice actress
- Years active: 2014–present

Caitlyn Bairstow is a Canadian voice actress in Vancouver, British Columbia.

She is known for her voice roles of Suna in Mega Man: Fully Charged, Glitch in Spy Kids: Mission Critical, Lucky in Super Lucky's Tale and Blue Bobbin in My Little Pony: Friendship Is Magic.

== Personal life ==
Bairstow has been dating Ian Hanlin since 2017. They first met while recording Nexo Knights. They live together and own a dog named Nester.

== Filmography ==
=== Animation ===
List of voice performances in animation
Year	Title	Role	Credit
2015	Mind Janitors	Timmy	
2016–2017	World Trigger	Chika Amatori	
2016–2018	My Little Pony: Friendship Is Magic	Blue Bobbin	Tweet
2017	Nexo Knights	Izzy Richmond, Lotta Fun, Lotta Budget	Tweet
2017–2018	Beyblade Burst	Honey Guten	
2018	Line Rangers	Cony, Eva, Bommm-Bi	
2018	Nina's World	Rhea the Raptor	
2018	Spy Kids: Mission Critical	Glitch, Training Orb, Lena	
2018	Littlest Pet Shop: A World of Our Own	Miss Hiss	
2018–2019	Mega Man: Fully Charged	Suna Light	Tweet
2019	Tobot Athlon	Tori	
2019	Hatchimals: Adventures in Hatchtopia	Cassie	Tweet
2020	Tobot Galaxy Detectives	Quinn	
2020	Zoids Wild	Tamara	
2020	Coach Me If You Can	Timea	
2021	Gigantosaurus	Plink	
2021	Lego Friends Holiday Special	Mia	
2022	Lego Friends Heartlake Stories: Fitting In	Mia	
2022	Lego Friends Heartlake Stories: Plight of the Bumblebee	Mia	
2022	Lego Friends Heartlake Stories: The Final Countdown	Mia	
2022	The Guava Juice Show	Daisy	
2023	Glitzy Dolls Go Dating	Chillie	
2023	Monster Loving Maniacs	Aevel	
2024	Dead Dead Demon's Dededede Destruction	Ai Demoto	
2025	Super Team Canada	Emoji	
2026	Smoking Behind the Supermarket with You	Yamada/Tayama	

=== Film ===
List of voice performances in film
Year	Title	Role	Notes
2016	Dive Olly Dive and the Octopus Rescue	Coco	Direct-to-DVD
2017	My Little Pony: The Movie	Additional Voices	Theatrical release
2019	Spirit Glitch	Claire	Telus Storyhive
2020	The Willoughbys	Additional Voices	Netflix Original
2022	Ivy + Bean: Doomed to Dance	Voice of Willis	Netflix Original
2025	Sylvanian Families the Movie: A Gift from Freya	Lyra Persian	Theatrical Release
2026	The Stickman's Hollow	Clara (voice)	Streaming

=== Video games ===
List of voice performances in video games
Year	Game	Role	Credit
2014	Crypt of the Necrodancer	Mary	Tweet
2017	A Hat in Time	Rumbi	
2017	Super Lucky's Tale	Lucky	
2018	Aegis Defenders	Kobo, Shreya	Tweet
2018	Dragalia Lost	Botan, Yachiyo, Linnea, Otoha	Tweet
2019	New Super Lucky's Tale	Lucky	
2023	Torchlight: Infinite	Crow Fiona	Tweet
2023	Arknights	W/Wiš'adel (English Voice Actor)	
2025	Rift of the NecroDancer	Dove	Instagram
2025	Avatar: Frontiers of Pandora	Mangkwan Raider	Instagram
2025	Love At The Milky Way Diner	Vega	Instagram
2026	Torchlight: Infinite	Vendetta's Sting Erika, Shelley	Instagram
2026	The Long Dark Episode 5: The Light at the End of All Things	Bar Patron	

=== Voice direction ===
List of Voice Director Credits
Year	Game	Credit
2021	La Tale Scenario Trailer	
2026	The Long Dark Episode 5: The Light at the End of All Things	

== Awards ==
- SOVAS Awards - Outstanding Anime Character - Best Voiceover (2023) - Nominee
- Leo Awards - Best Voice Performance Animation Series (2024) - Nominee
