= Royal Soldier =

Royal soldiers are a group of soldiers that protect a royal person.

Royal Soldier may also refer to:

- Royal Soldier, an album by Jah Cure, 2019
- Royal Soldiers (Nexo Knights), a character in Nexo Knights
