= Lucky's Tale =

2016 3D platforming video game for Oculus Rift

- Developer: Playful Studios
- Publisher: Playful Studios
- Engine: Unity
- Platforms: Oculus Rift, Meta Quest 2 ,Meta Quest , SteamVR, PlayStation VR
- Release: Oculus Rift: WW: March 28, 2016; Oculus Quest 2: WW: November 18, 2021; SteamVR: WW: December 9, 2021; PlayStation VR: WW: April 7, 2022
- Genre: Platform
- Mode: Single-player

Lucky's Tale is a 2016 platform game developed and published by American studio Playful Studios and released in 2016 as a launch title and pack-in game for the Oculus Rift virtual reality headset. A sequel without VR support titled Super Lucky's Tale was released worldwide in November 2017. A remastered version of the game was released for Oculus Quest 2 and PCVR headsets via Steam in 2021, featuring improvements to the game's graphics, audio and movement, as well as replacing Lucky's character model with the one from New Super Lucky's Tale. A PlayStation VR version was released on April 7, 2022.

== Gameplay ==
In game's opening cutscene, Piggy is kidnapped by the evil Glorp, setting Lucky out on a quest to save his friend. Lucky's Tale focuses on 3D platforming, with the player completing linear levels set in themed worlds. The player views Lucky from a 3rd person perspective, and can aim by tilting the headset. The player gains an extra life when they collect a hundred coins, and holes can be found that transport the player to hidden underground areas. Each stage has three separate objectives: to reach the end of the level, to complete a time trial, and to find all the hidden coins scattered throughout.

Lucky's Tale was designed with the intent of giving players the true experience of being inside a game. Paul Bettner, CEO of Playful Studios, explained, "Everything that we've done has been designed to evoke that feeling as strongly as possible of 'this is what I always expected it might feel like if I actually was in the games of my childhood.'"

Bettner described the game's partnership with the Oculus Rift VR headset as an "opportunity to create an entry point for people encountering this phenomenal new hardware and yet to play something familiar and comfortable."

== Reception ==
Reception

Aggregate score
Aggregator	Score
Metacritic	66/100

Review scores
Publication	Score
Destructoid	7.5/10
Game Informer	6.5/10
GameSpot	5/10
IGN	6/10
PC Gamer (US)	72/100

Lucky's Tale received "mixed or average" reviews, according to review aggregator website Metacritic.

In a review for Game Informer, Andrew Reiner criticized the variety of the game, writing "Leaping across lily pads and tail-whacking enemies becomes the routine for most of the stages, and the occasional boss fights and bomb-throwing sequences aren't enough to spice up the action". Destructoid's Chris Carter praised the sense of presence virtual reality brought to the game. "I appreciate the fact that I can just tilt my head ever so slightly to look around for threats rather than move an analog stick, and it truly does add to the experience". PC Gamer liked the way the game used verticality, but felt that the levels took a long time to become interesting, "While the last couple of levels feel slightly more distinct, with more complex moving platforms and shifting walls, they only arrive at the very end of the game".

IGN disliked how the game forced players to replay levels in order to progress, calling it, "blatantly repetitive padding". GameSpot wrote that the game felt formulaic and struggled to hold the player's interest over its five-hour runtime, "Coupled with its benign art style, the simple design of Lucky's Tale makes it feel like a safe, calculated effort, rather than a creative achievement".
