= List of Nexo Knights characters =

This is a list of characters from Nexo Knights.

== Nexo Knights ==
The Nexo Knights are the defenders of Knighton. The Nexo Knights fight the forces of Jestro and Monstrox. Among the members of the Nexo Knights are:

- Clay Moorington (voiced by Giles Panton) – Clay Moorington is the leader of the Nexo Knights. Clay is no-nonsense and lives by the Knight's Code, dedicated to being the best knight he can (having dreamed of it since being a young orphan). His strictly regimented style occasionally causes him to clash with his fellow knights, particularly the more laid back Lance. His armor is blue and his crest shows a falcon and his signature weapon is a Claymore, which has the ability to supercharge into the "Sword of Strength". Clay rides around in the Rumble Blade, a large vehicle with two sidecars and a plane shaped like a sword that splits off into smaller vehicles. Beginning in "The Cloud," Clay drives the Falcon Fighter Blaster, a fighter jet with bladed wings. Starting in "A Little Rusty," Clay is affected by the Cloud of Monstrox's dark magic, which slowly transforms him to stone. The transformation is completed in "Rock Bottom", with Aaron covering for Clay until he can be restored. In "The Gray Knight", Clay is reanimated by the Cloud of Monstrox and used to try and destroy the other knights. In "Heart of Stone", it is revealed that Ruina is Clay's mother and Merlok's sister, making Clay the nephew of Merlok. Later on, Clay regains his human form and heroic mindset and helps to battle the Colossus of Ultimate Destruction.
- Princess Macy Halbert (voiced by Erin Mathews) – Princess Macy Halbert is one of the Nexo Knights, and is the only female in the team. Her parents are King and Queen Halbert, but King Halbert initially disagrees with her decision to join the knights. Her armor is red and her crest shows a dragon, and she carries a power mace in battle. Macy's vehicle is the Thunder Mace, a large motorcycle with twin cannons. In "Rock Bottom," Macy starts using a dragon-shaped vehicle named "Hotspur" that can fly, shoot fireballs, and combine with her battle suit.
- Lancelot "Lance" Richmond (voiced by Ian Hanlin) – Lance Richmond is a Nexo Knight who does not always have a positive attitude towards training and usually butts heads with Clay. He is very rich and displays a spoiled personality. His armor is white and his crest is a horse. His weapon is his namesake, a lance. Outside the Fortrex, his preferred means of travel is his Mecha Horse/Turbo Jouster, a robotic horse that can convert into a motorcycle. Both forms possess a larger version of Lance's trademark weapon. In "Greed is Good?," it was revealed that Lance was forced to become a knight by his parents when he was young. Starting "A Little Rusty," Lance drives the Twin Jouster, which can detach its back half to increase its speed.
- Aaron Fox (voiced by Alessandro Juliani) – Aaron Fox is one of the Nexo Knights who enjoys thrills. His armor is green and his crest is a fox, and he employs a Blazer Bow as his main weapon. Aaron enjoys employing his knight shield as a hover board, and often attacks from the air. Aside from his shield, his main choice of transportation is a crossbow-shaped fighter jet called the Bow Flyer. Upon Clay's transformation to stone, Aaron was made into the new leader for the Nexo Knights until Merlok 2.0 can find a way to restore Clay to normal. After "In Charge", Aaron drives a new vehicle called the Rock Climber.
- Axl (voiced by Brian Drummond) – Axl is the largest of the Nexo Knights. He loves food and is the strongman of the team. His armor is yellow and his crest is a bull, and he wields a massive battleaxe. When in need of a vehicle he boards the Tower Carrier, a truck pulling a detachable small tower. Later on, Axl drives a new vehicle called the Rumble Maker, which is equipped with twin drills and can transform into an aerial vehicle.

== Supporting characters ==
- Merlok 2.0 (voiced by Brian Drummond) – A digital wizard who helps the Knights defeat evil by sending them Nexo Powers. Merlok was originally a normal wizard who was the last wizard in the kingdom of Knighton and a member of the Wizards' Council. He had a sister named Wanda Moorington, who was also on the Wizards' Council before being turned evil by Monstrox and becoming Ruina. Due to Wanda being Merlok's sister, this makes Merlok the uncle of Clay, which he initially refused to tell Clay. When Jestro first allied with the Book of Monsters, Merlok used his magic to drive them out of the capital city, but was inadvertently absorbed into the castle's computers. In "The Fall," Merlok 2.0 downloads his form into a robot body dubbed Mechlok.
- Robin Underwood (voiced by Erin Mathews) – Robin wants to become a Nexo Knight and is a first-year student at the Knights' Academy. His crest shows a chicken and he often employs the Fortrex's weapons during battles with the Lava Monster Army. Robin is known as the master mechanic who built the battle suits and more.
- Ava Prentis (voiced by Maryke Hendrikse) – Robin's friend and the resident tech expert who supports the Knights in their battle against evil. Ava is very sensible despite her young age, and usually assists the knights from the inside of their high-tech base. She has a knack for programming and high tech inventions such as the computer sword Techcalibur which enabled her to upload Merlok 2.0 into the Fortrex.
- King Halbert (voiced by Brian Drummond) – The King of Knighton, Queen Halbert's husband, and Princess Macy's father. Despite his position, he is rather timid and inclined to panic or worry at the first sign of trouble. King Halbert loves his wife and daughter but is not entirely comfortable with Macy being one of the knights, and wouldn't have allowed her to graduate had it not been for his queen's intervention. Despite this, he does his best to aid the knights in their efforts to protect the kingdom including allowing them to overhaul his RV into their Fortrex base. King Halbert also commands a large humanoid mech when the need arises for him to go into battle.
- Queen Halbert (voiced by Nicole Oliver) – The Queen of Knighton, King Halbert's wife, and Macy's mother. Unlike her husband, Queen Halbert approves of Macy's desire to be a knight and seems much more confident in tense situations. Macy takes after her mother in terms of both appearance and fighting ability, and the queen is just as handy with a mace as her daughter.
- Hamletta – Lance's pet domestic pig. Lance initially encountered Hamletta while being held hostage by the Lava Monster Army and adopted her after escaping.
- Haute FancyPants – A Kingbot who is the personal attendant of King Halbert and Queen Halbert.
- Herb Herbertson (voiced by Brian Drummond) – Knighton's resident newscaster on the Knighton News Network (KNN).
- Alice Squires (voiced by Nicole Oliver) – A robot newscaster who assists Herb Herbertson on the Knighton News Network.
- Chef Eclair (voiced by Brian Drummond) – A Chefbot that cooks different meals for the inhabitants of Knightonia's castle. He is considered to be Axl's favorite robot as Chef Eclair never gets tired of cooking for him.
- Robots – The Kingdom of Knighton is home to a number of robots who serve various tasks such as helping defend the kingdom or providing the knights with training partners.
  - Squirebots – The helpful robots who fight to defend the kingdom.
    - Dennis – A Lancebot who is Lance's personal attendant, having taken care of Lance since he was a baby. Dennis quit working for Lance in "The Book of Total Badness," but returned on the condition that Lance serves him once a week. In "Storm Over Rock Wood," Dennis quits working for Lance to join Robot Hoodlum's Merry Mechs.
    - Claybot – The Squirebot of Clay who wields a claymore. The Claybots can oil swords and sharpen the boots.
    - Macybot – A Squirebot who was originally commissioned by King Halbert to teach Macy how to be a princess. Although it has been reprogrammed by Ava when Macy became a knight, it still has some of its old programming left.
    - Aaronbot – The Squirebot for Aaron who is dedicated to Aaron's safety. The Aaronbot can help calculate risk and assert dangerous situations.
    - Axlbot – A Squirebot who serves Axl in going back and forth from the kitchen to get Axl's food. It tends to have a bad sense of direction.
    - Deputybots - Squirebot cowboys employed by Jorah Tightwad that live in the west, specifically in the town of Nothing Hill.
  - Royal Soldiers – The obedient robots that serve the Knightonia Royal Family as soldiers. The Royal Soldiers tend to prefer to stand in long ranks, then be thrown into battle against the attacking monsters.
  - Chili Vanilla - A mech-hop group of two Squirebots.
- Sir Swordmore Brickland (voiced by Michael Adamthwaite) – The principal of the Knights Academy.
- Jorah Tightwad (voiced by Brian Drummond) – A wealthy "gold factory" owner who is somewhat full of himself. He obtained the Book of Envy when Merlok scattered the Books of Power across the kingdom, making him desire everything. He was robbed of the Book of Envy in "The King's Tournament" by Macy who in turn lost it to Jestro's forces. He harbours a hatred for the Nexo Knights in the fourth season due to the fact that they tend to foil his illicit attempts to make money for himself. He has a Scottish accent.
  - Lotta Fun & Lotta Budget (voiced by Caitlyn Bairstow) – Tightwad's twin Squirebot assistants. Their personalities reflect their names with Lotta Fun being perky and upbeat, while Lotta Budget is more grumpy and money focused.
  - Tighty Knighties – Tightwad's servants who serve as his counterparts of the Nexo Knights. Although they appear to be skilled with their weapons in tournaments, they are actually cowardly and inept at combat against Jestro and Monstrox's forces. Their names parody those of real-life celebrities.
    - Shia LaBlade (voiced by Ian Hanlin) – The Tighty Knighties' counterpart of Clay who wields a double-bladed sword. His name is a reference to Shia LaBeouf.
    - Jousting Bieber (voiced by Vincent Tong) – The Tighty Knighties' counterpart of Lance. His name is a reference to Justin Bieber.
    - Brickney Spears (voiced by Maryke Hendrikse) – The Tighty Knighties' counterpart of Macy who wields a modified spear. She is named after Britney Spears.
    - The Blok (voiced by Giles Panton) – The Tighty Knighties' counterpart of Axl who wields a sledgehammer. His name is a reference to Dwayne "The Rock" Johnson.
- Robot Hoodlum – A rebel Squirebot who lives in Rock Wood Forest. As the leader of the Merry Mechs, Robot Hoodlum steals from the rich and uses their money to take care of the many forgotten and disused robots that have joined up with the Merry Mechs. He is a parody of Robin Hood.

== Villains ==
- Monstrox (voiced by Mark Oliver) – The main antagonist of the series. Monstrox was a necromancer and former member of the Wizards' Council who terrorized Knighton with his monster armies and the Forbidden Powers a century ago prior to the events of the series. Merlok transformed Monstrox into a sentient book of dark magic known as the Book of Monsters, containing the essence of his monster army that can be summoned from his pages. Merlok also divided Monstrox's corruptive power into eleven spellbooks: the Book of Evil, the Book of Chaos, the Book of Fear, the Book of Anger, the Book of Deception, the Book of Destruction, the Book of Revenge, the Book of Greed, the Book of Envy, the Book of Cruelty, and the Book of Betrayal. Out of pride, Merlok did not destroy the books and housed them in his library to study them. At the start of the series, Monstrox is found by Jestro, concealing his true identity while persuading the jester to aid him in regaining the books. After Jestro turns on him, Monstrox's true identity is revealed along with his need to possess a host body to regain a physical form. Monstrox originally intends to possess Jestro, but he decides to use Clay instead. After Clay destroys the Book of Monsters, Monstrox survives as a cloud-like being called the Cloud of Monstrox. The Cloud of Monstrox leads Jestro and the Stone Monster Army into awakening the Colossus of Ultimate Destruction to destroy Knighton. The Cloud of Monstrox possesses the Colossus, only to be destroyed by Clay.
- Jestro (voiced by Vincent Tong) – Jestro was once the king's court jester, and was mocked due to his clumsiness. This allowed Monstrox to persuade him to turn to evil in order to take revenge on his former mockers. After stealing one of Merlok's magic staffs and getting his magic library scattered across the wilds of Knighton, Jestro is guided by Monstrox to retrieve the other books that contain his power. Despite giving in to the Book's pressure and being exposed to the Book of Evil and gaining a monstrous appearance, Jestro harbors doubts about his villainous role before learning he was intended to become Monstrox's new body once he regained his full power. In the season 2 finale, Jestro reforms completely and helps the Nexo Knights save Clay, reverting to his original appearance upon Monstrox's apparent destruction. In third season, Jestro encounters the Cloud of Monstrox, who uses his lightning to control Jestro into helping him again, giving him an electrifying appearance and turning him even crazier than his original corruption. He reforms again after being freed from Monstrox's lightning.
- Roberto Arnoldi (voiced by Vincent Tong) – Roberto Arnoldi is a sculptor who used to work for King Halbert and takes things very literally. One day, he was commissioned to make a "smashing" statue of Queen Halbert. When he literally made a smashing statue of Queen Halbert hammering Scurriers and Globlins, Queen Halbert was pleased while King Halbert was displeased. After King Halbert fired him and kicked him out of Knightonia, Arnoldi settled in the Badlands near Mount Thunderstrox, where he sold Stone Garden Gnomes to make money. After meeting Jestro and the Cloud of Monstrox, Arnoldi sided with them in order to get revenge on Knightonia. After the Colossus of Ultimate Destruction is destroyed, Arnoldi and Jestro were seen cleaning up its remains.

=== Lava Monster Army ===
The Lava Monster Army is a group of fiery monsters made of lava that fight the Nexo Knights upon being summoned from the Book of Monsters by Jestro. When the members of the Lava Monster Army are defeated, they end up back in the Book of Monsters. In "Hot Rock Massage", it is revealed that the destruction of the Book of Monsters left them without a job. They wandered the kingdom until they found a Rogul containing the Forbidden Power of Blazing Burn and gained hope that they could build a town for them to live in called Burningham. After doing so, they ended up regretting the crimes they had done under the Book of Monsters' control and were no longer interested in fighting.

Among the members of the Lava Monster Army are:

- General Magmar (voiced by Garry Chalk) – A lava monster who is Jestro's chief strategist, warrior, and cook. Back when Monstrox still had a body, General Magmar served as Monstrox's right-hand man. In the third season, Magmar becomes the Mayor of Burningham and the new leader of the Lava Monster Army.
- Bookkeeper – A dim-witted humanoid lava monster that carries the Book of Monsters around. It serves no other apparent function and tends to screw up. In the third season, the Bookkeeper becomes a glockenspiel performer. During this time, the Cloud of Monstrox didn't know that the Bookkeeper can talk.
- Burnzie (voiced by Giles Panton) – A large horned lava monster with large teeth who is best friends with Sparkks. He and Sparkks make up the muscle of the Lava Monster Army.
- Sparkks (voiced by Alessandro Juliani) – A lava monster with one eye, horns, and bat-like wings who is best friends with Burnzie. Together, they make up the muscle of the Lava Monster Army.
- Beast Master (voiced by Giles Panton) – An eyepatch-wearing lava monster who specializes in ordering the other Lava Monsters around to do Jestro's bidding. He wields two chains with Globlins at the other end of them.
- Lavaria (voiced by Nicole Oliver) – A sneaky lava monster who serves as Jestro's chief spy. It is hinted in her LEGO.com description and the episode "The Golden Castle" that she was in love with Jestro and vice versa. In the third season, Lavaria has become a yoga teacher in Burningham.
- Whiparella (voiced by Nicole Oliver) – A female lava monster with a snake tail in place of legs. She carries a pair of whips that can cause anyone struck by them to have their greatest fears come to life. In the third season, Whiparella has become a street artist in Burningham.
- Flama (voiced by Ian Hanlin) – A molten lava monster with a ghostly tail who is the twin brother of Moltor. In the third season, Flama works at the Hot Rock Cafe in Burningham.
- Moltor – A black-skinned lava monster with rocky fists who is the twin brother of Flama. In Season 3, Moltor works at the Hot Rock Cafe in Burningham.
- Flame Throwers – Lava monster soldiers in mohawks with infernal insides.
- Crust Smashers – Hard-skinned lava monster soldiers.
- Ash Attackers – Armored lava monster soldiers made up of volcanic ash that wear horned helmets. Some of the Ash Attackers feature bat-like wings.
- Globlins – Spherical lava monsters who lack limbs and attack with their teeth.
  - Spider Globlins – A version of the Globlins with spider-like legs who were created by the Book of Fear.
- Scurriers – Diminutive pear-shaped, goblin-like, lava monsters who are one of the most numerous lava monsters at Jestro's command. He gained the ability to summon them using the Book of Chaos.
- Infernoxes – Gigantic lava monsters with gaping maws and huge hammers. Jestro gained the ability to summon them using the Book of Destruction.

=== Stone Monster Army ===
The Stone Monster Army is a group of rock monsters that are reanimated by the Cloud of Monstrox's lightning.

- Ruina Stoneheart (voiced by Heather Doerksen) – A Stone Monster who is the Stone Monster Army's residential witch and was first introduced in "Rock Bottom". She is given the task of capturing the 'heart' of the kingdom Macy's mother. In "Heart of Stone", she reveals to Clay that she is his mother. In the following episode "Between a Rock and a Hard Place," Merlok tells Ruina's sad tale, in which he reveals that Ruina was actually his sister Wanda Moorington and was a member of the Wizard's Council before she became unwillingly evil through Monstrox's influence.
- General Garg (voiced by Noel Johansen) – A black gargoyle-like Stone Monster that serves as the general of the Stone Monster Army and a member of Jestro and the Cloud of Monstox's inner circle. Unlike most of his kind, he is relatively intelligent and well-modulated.
- Lord Krakenskull (voiced by Noel Johansen) – A Stone Monster warlord who can combine Forbidden Powers. He created the Forbidden Power of Petrified Quake by combining two other Forbidden Powers together, allowing his Krakenbeast to generate earthquakes and petrify objects with a roar. Krakenskull only speaks in an indecipherable language referred to as "Kraken," though many of his fellow Stone Monsters and Monstrox tend to understand him.
  - Krakenbeast – Lord Krakenskull's monstrous, draconic-like steed that harnesses his combined Forbidden Powers. It can track down the Forbidden Powers by scent.
- Three Brothers (all voiced by Jason Simpson) – The Three Brothers are three granite golems who nearly defeated the original Wizards Council only to be buried underground by them under a mountain.
  - Reex – A Stone Monster with a left eyepatch who is the younger brother of Roog and Rumble. He is said to be fastest of the Three Brothers.
  - Roog – A Stone Monster who is the middle brother of Reex and Rumble. He is said to be a master strategist and the smartest of the Three Brothers.
  - Rumble – A Stone Monster who is the oldest and largest of the Three Brothers. Roberto Arnoldi sculpted a vehicle-like body for Rumble after his original body was destroyed in battle.
- Harpies – These Harpies are a trio of flying Stone Monsters that are good at grabbing and "old friends" of Monstrox. The Harpies were originally statues in a swamp until they were reanimated by the Cloud of Monstrox.
  - Hilda – A Harpy.
  - Ingrid – A Harpy.
  - Ulrika – A Harpy.
- Roguls – The Roguls are humanoid Stone Monsters who were created to guard the Forbidden Powers. The Roguls were returned to their statue state after the defeat of the Monstrox-possessed Colossus.
- Gravellers – A group of round Stone Monsters who are one of the foot soldiers of the Stone Monster Army.
- Bouldrons – A group of wheel-shaped Stone Monsters who are one of the foot soldiers of the Stone Monster Army.
- Stone Gnomes – A group of pointy-headed garden gnomes created by Roberto Arnoldi and brought to life by the Cloud of Monstrox to strengthen the Stone Monster Army. They can launch themselves head first into their enemies like missiles.
- Bricksters – A group of brick-themed Stone Monsters who are one of the foot soldiers of the Stone Monster Army.
- Stone Stompers – A group of Stone Monsters who serve as the ground foot soldiers of the Stone Monster Army.
- Gargoyles – A group of gargoyles reanimated by the Cloud of Monstrox who serve as the aerial foot soldiers of the Stone Monster Army.
- Grimrocs – A group of terracotta-made Stone Monsters who were petrified by Merlok during his fight with them and Monstrox in Rock Wood Forest. Some versions of them have wings. The Grimrocs were later reanimated by the Cloud of Monstrox.
- Colossus of Ultimate Destruction – A gigantic Stone Monster buried within Mount Thunderstrox. It possesses the ability to harness each of the Forbidden Powers stored within its crown. It was awoken and possessed by the Cloud of Monstrox in "Between a Rock and a Hard Place," and, using it, Monstrox to full command of the Stone Monster Army. Clay manages to destroy the Colossus, though Ruina secretly takes a fragment of its body.

=== CyberBiters ===
The third wave of Nexo Knights action figures features the CyberBiters which are a group of cybernetic vampires infected by Monstrox's computer virus. Due to the show stopping production, they only appear in the toyline.

- Count Dragov - The leader of the CyberBiters, father of Fred and Pola and former member of the Wizards' Council. He is corrupted by Monstrox's virus to help him take over Knighton.
- Fred - A member of the CyberBiters and the twin brother of Pola.
- Pola - A member of the CyberBiters with a cybernetic right eye and the twin sister of Fred.
- Cezar - A member of the CyberBiters with spider-like legs who acts as an assassin.
- Berserker - A member of the CyberBiters who pilots a bomber who acts as a brute.
- Vanbyter No. 307 -
- Vanbyter No. 407 -
- CyberCritters - small insects that spread Monstrox's computer virus all across Knighton.
- InfectoByters - A group of corrupted cybernetic vampires that are the foot soldiers of the CyberBiters.
- MegaByter - An InfectoByter that ride on a Vyro Glyder.
- MechaByter - An InfectoByter that rides on a Vyro Suit.
- Cyberbyters - A group of Squirebots infected by Monstrox's virus.

=== Forest Monster Army ===
The Forest Monster Army is a group of monsters seen in the book "Lego Nexo Knights: The Book of Monsters" and did not appear in the animated series. They consist of twisted plants and fungus.

Among the members of the Forest Monster Army are:

- Mushlord - A mushroom-themed Forest Monster who is the leader of the Forest Monster Army.
- Baron Badwood - A tree-type Forest Monster and commander of the Forest Monster Army who wields a sword made out of flies.
- Dame Flora - A flower-type Forest Monster who serves as the chief gardener of the Forest Monster Army.
- Bramblina - A grape-type Forest Monster who wields thorny vine-like whips.
- Loggerhead - A tree-themed Forest Monster who uses a cane. As Loggerhead has no brain, there is a woodpecker living in him that helps him by telling him which way to go.
- Deadwood and Knot - Deadwood is a tree-themed Forest Monster and Knot is a sentient knot of wood on Deadwood's belt whose real name is Addison Posh St. Claire III. As Deadwood is easily confused, the short-tempered Knot has to constantly monitor him. Deadwood is known to enjoy woodcarving and building campfires, to the chagrin of Knot.
- Berry Globlins - A group of berry-type Globlins that are commanded by Bramblina. They shoot exploding seeds.
- Shrooms of Doom - A group of small mushroom-type Forest Monsters who work for Mushlord.
- Elm of the Dark Realm - A giant tree monster.

=== Sea Monster Army ===
The Sea Monster Army is a group of monsters seen in the book "Lego Nexo Knights: The Book of Monsters" and did not appear in the TV series. They consist of humanoid sea creatures who travel on a pirate ship that is powered by electric eels.

Among the members of the Sea Monster Army are:

- Marquis de Seaweed - The leader of the Sea Monster Army who wields a trident. He has a pet piranha named Shredder and once dated a sea urchin.
- Mate Squiddybeard - The commander of the Sea Monster Army with tentacles for a beard and a crab-like claw for a left hand. He enjoys sushi and once dated a coral.
- Chef Savage - The chef of the Sea Monster Army with a headband over his left eye and a trident-like prong for a left hand who owns his own restaurant. Chef Savage is said to cook better than General Magmar.
  - Poop and Deck - Fish-like waiters who work for Chef Savage.
- Sharkerado - A knight-armored shark-type member of the Sea Monster Army who wields a mace-tipped flail and specializes in crossing moats.
- Siren - A mermaid-type member of the Sea Monster Army.
- Behemoth of Brine - A giant sea monster who is the largest member of the Sea Monster Army. Its forehead resembles a tropical island and once dated an iceberg.

== Other characters ==
- Goldie Richmond (voiced by Jennifer Hayward) – Lance's mother.
- Cuthbert Richmond (voiced by Brian Drummond) – Lance's father.
- Izzy Richmond (voiced by Caitlyn Bairstow) – Lance's little sister who attends the Knights' Academy alongside Fletcher Bowman. Originally appearing as a main character in the "Knights Academy" spin-off books series, Izzy made her mainline debut in the animated series episode "Weekend at Halbert's", where she is shown visiting the Fortex as part of a Knights' Academy student field trip. In the book series, she is described as being a talkative and excitable young knight who is not a fan of all the media attention that comes with being a Richmond.
- Fletcher "Fletch" Bowman (voiced by Sam Vincent) – An orphan from the countryside who attends the Knights Academy alongside Izzy Richmond. Originally appearing as a main character in the "Knights' Academy" spin-off books series, Fletcher made his mainline debut in "Weekend at Halbert's", where he is shown visiting the Fortex as part of a Knights Academy student field trip. In the book series, Fletcher is shown to be a bit clueless in regards to his knight training, while subsequently demonstrating a talent for sorcery. It was to be revealed later on that he is the son of Ruina Stoneheart and Clay's younger brother, left by his mother before she succumbed to evil.
- Axlina (voiced by Brian Drummond) - Axl's younger sister. She has a crush on Robin.
- Coughmeyer (voiced by Colin Murdock) - The mayor of Snottingham.
- Edvard Evanson (voiced by Ian Hanlin) - The curator at the Knighton Official Museum of Art. He has an intense dislike for Roberto Arnoldi.
- Gobbleton Rambley (voiced by Alan Marriott) – A Knighton celebrity chef who Axl admires and was a culinary classmate to Chef Eclair. He is a parody of Gordon Ramsay. Though he is seen to be always angry on camera, he is timid off-camera.
- Hadda Hammerin (voiced by Lisa Bunting) - The mayor of the town Hammerin and cousin to the Queen.
- Lance cosplayer (voiced by Michael Daingerfield) – A kid cosplaying as Lance at Knight-A-Con.
- Jokes Knightly (voiced by Michael Daingerfield) – A washed-up comedian who is Jestro's hero and the reason why he became a jester.
- Jurgen von Stroheim (voiced by Ian Hanlin) – A Knighton film director. He first appears in "The Golden Castle" as the director of the remake of the titular film. He becomes a heavily recurring character in Season 3 where he is first seen directing the Tighty Knighties' music video and then later working alongside Lance to try and film a Nexo Knights reality holovision show. Jurgen shows respect towards leading actors, but he disrespects extras believing them to be nothing more than "talking props."
- Jack Shields (voiced by Ian Hanlin) – A member of the King's secret service who trains Clay on how to be a spy. He is a parody of James Bond.
- Maynard - Lance's agent.
- Roger the Scrubber (voiced by Vincent Tong) - The mayor of Cleanington who owns the Scrubbery Barn.
- Sir Griffiths (voiced by Michael Adamthwaithe) - A teacher and old acquaintance of Principal Brickland who is portrayed with a southern drawl.
- Slab Rockowski (voiced by Kirby Morrow) – A magician and demolitions expert who is an old friend of Merlok's.
