= Mega Man: Fully Charged =

American-Japanese-Canadian animated television series

- Series title card
- Genre: Action; Adventure; Science fantasy; Superhero
- Based on: Mega Man by Capcom
- Developed by: Man of Action; Dentsu Entertainment USA
- Written by: Man of Action; Marcus Rinehart; A.J. Marchisello; Michael Oliver; Joe Barnathan
- Directed by: Gino Nichele; Clint Butler
- Voices of: Vincent Tong; Michael Adamthwaite; Caitlyn Bairstow; Kathleen Barr; Ryan Beil; Garry Chalk; Brian Drummond; Cole Howard; Ian Hanlin; Andrew McNee; Peter New; Mark Oliver; Travis Turner; Samuel Vincent
- Theme music composer: Steffan Andrews
- Composer: Steffan Andrews
- Countries of origin: United States; Japan; Canada
- Original language: English
- No. of seasons: 1
- No. of episodes: 52

Production
- Executive producers: Yuichi Kinoshita; Marc Harrington; Ken Faier; Josh Scherba; Anne Loi; Man of Action; Kazuhiro Tsuchiya; Hiroyuki Kobayashi
- Producers: Satoshi Fujii; Susane Bélec; Morgana Duque
- Editors: Joel Salaysay; Leland Miller; Lori Zei
- Running time: 11 minutes
- Production companies: Capcom; Dentsu Entertainment USA; DHX Media; DHX Studios Vancouver

Original release
- Network: Cartoon Network (United States); Family Chrgd (Canada)
- Release: August 5, 2018 – May 23, 2019

Mega Man: Fully Charged is an animated television series based on the Japanese video game series Mega Man, published by Capcom. The series was developed by Man of Action Studios and produced by Dentsu Entertainment USA and DHX Studios Vancouver for Cartoon Network and Family Chrgd. It is the fourth television series based on the franchise, and the second to draw inspiration from the "Classic" series after the 1994 series. It premiered in the United States on August 5, 2018, after the first ten episodes were first released on-demand on August 3.

== Synopsis ==
The series follows Aki Light, an advanced robot who looks like and lives the routine of a human schoolboy. He was built by scientist Dr. Light as his son and lives with his biologically human sister Suna Light. They live in Silicon City, a town co-inhabited by robots and humans rather peacefully, though is currently seeing new attacks from rogue robots (the Robot Masters of the franchise). Aki responds by transforming into "Mega Man" and battles to neutralize the threat and protect the civilians from harm. Allies to Mega Man include Mega Mini, a wise-cracking miniature robot who operates within his forehead; his robot dog Rush; and Suna Light.

Other characters include Sgt. Night, a war veteran who gives anti-robot speeches (though works with the rogue robots to reignite a human-robot war) and Bert Wily, a classmate and friend to Aki Light.

== Characters ==
=== Main ===
- Mega Man (voiced by Vincent Tong) – The protagonist and hero of Silicon City. Aki Light is a robot boy who looks like a regular human, and with the ability to transform into his superhero identity of Mega Man. He can fire energy blasts from his arm cannon and has the ability to replicate the schematics of other robots in order to copy their abilities while having the personalities of some of them as a side-effect. While he can act cocky at times, he cares deeply for his family and friends and will risk his life to protect them to the best of his ability. He is considered highly advanced due to his power set.
- Mega Mini (voiced by Ryan Beil) – Aki's mechanic and sidekick of sorts who powers his armor and gives him his abilities. He occasionally pops out of his head to speak and loves to make wisecracks. What started off as animosity for Blasto Woman after getting kidnapped by her, has turned into a full on crush that seems to be reciprocated.
- Suna Light (voiced by Caitlyn Bairstow) – Aki's human sister and ally. She is one of the few who knows about Aki's double identity. She is intelligent and has numerous gadgets at her disposal to aid her "ro-bro".
- Dr. Thomas Light (voiced by Garry Chalk) – Aki's father and a supporter of human/robot relations. In "Panic in the Lighthouse", it is revealed that he has always known of his son's double identity which he makes Aki know of after using the Mega Key to heal Chaotique.
- Rush – The Light family's robot dog. He eventually gets his own armor and becomes Mega Man's sidekick.

=== Supporting ===
- Bert Wily (voiced by Cole Howard) is Aki's friend and ally. He is an enthusiastic up-and-coming inventor who is a huge fan of Mega Man, but does not realize he and Aki are the same person. The episodes "Drilling Deep" and "A Split End" hint at his connection to Dr. Wily when he accidentally gets a similar hairstyle. The Boom comic mini-series reveals that Dr. Wily is Bert's grandfather, whom he looks up to.
- Peter Punkowski (voiced by Cole Howard) is a nerdy know-it-all student at Silicon Central School.
- Ashley Adderley (voiced by Shannon Chan-Kent) is an intellectual and sarcastic girl who Aki secretly has a crush on, which she reciprocates.
- Jacques is a small toaster-themed robot at Silicon Central.
- Principal 100100 (voiced by Brian Drummond) is a former battle robot the size of a building who is refashioned as the principal of Silicon Central School. During the Hard Age, he was a close ally and fellow soldier of Wood Man.
- The Good Guild are a police squadron in charge of protecting Silicon City. Since they are not trained to handle the rogue Robot Masters, they call upon Mega Man to help defeat them.

=== Villains ===
- Sgt. Breaker Night/Lord Obsidian (voiced by Michael Adamthwaite) is the main antagonist of the series. He is a human who believes that humans and robots can not be together and wants to destroy human/robot relations by holding anti-robot rallies and persuading some robots to attack humans. In the past, he fought in a long-forgotten conflict called the Hard Wars, which was fought between humans and robots. When he becomes Lord Obsidian, he is a powerful robot hellbent on turning into Mega Man into the perfect weapon for his own agenda. In the season 1 finale, he is defeated and his identity as Lord Obsidian is exposed. When being questioned about his hypocrisy of preaching human supremacy yet organizing a robot revolution, he reveals he seeks the "Mega Key" to turn all robots into slaves. He also states that humans are technically superior since they initially created robots as tools, but Dr. Light attempting to establish unity with them made humans feel weak. He is then arrested by the Good Guild along with most of his Robot Masters, as Light informs him robots and humans will know peace someday, which Breaker will have plenty of time to consider in prison.
- Namagem (voiced by Vincent Tong) is Sgt. Night's robot lieutenant, who was created to be superior to Mega Man. He wants to prove himself superior to his heroic counterpart by any means necessary. Unlike Mega Man, he can copy up to five schematics at a time. A running gag throughout the first season had Aki failing to learn his name, and when he finally does, he admits it sounds lame. In "The Gauntlet" Pt. II, it is revealed he is Aki's long-lost twin brother, who Sgt. Night stole during the end of the Hard Age. His true form is revealed when Sgt. Night is defeated, and he leaves while vowing revenge. In the Boom comic series, he takes on the name "Daini" and receives upgrades from Dr. Wily. He fights Aki one more time before they and Suna team up to fight Dr. Wily.
- The Hoover Gang are a trio of criminals that consist of two humans and one robot. They once worked as custodians before turning to a life of crime.
  - Wayne (voiced by Ryan Beil) is a member of the Hoover Gang.
  - Duane (voiced by Michael Adamthwaite) is a member of the Hoover Gang.
  - Vacuhead is a robot who is a member of the Hoover Gang. He has a tank on his back and a window scrubber for a left hand.
- Chaotique (voiced by Rhona Rees) is a robot with skates that allow her to move at super-speed. She claims to know Mega Man's true identity in the episode "Old School", but she mistakenly believed Peter Punkowski to be Mega Man's secret identity, and is ultimately proven wrong as she tries to recreate "The Big Fade Away" prank.

=== Robot Masters ===
The following Robot Masters in this series are listed in order of appearance:

- Fire Man (voiced by Ian Hanlin) is a former welding bot who turned against humanity after he was fired and is now loyal to Lord Obsidian.
- Drill Man (voiced by Andrew McNee) is a construction robot frustrated with being forced into the family business after it was bought by Skyraisers Inc, as he wanted to be a musician.
- Hypno Woman (voiced by Kathleen Barr) is a former school counselor robot at Silicon Central with mind control powers. She left her job after being overwhelmed with solving the students' problems. She has a human disguise named Mari and wishes to become more domesticated.
- Wave Man (voiced by Samuel Vincent) is a former sewer sanitation robot who floods the city while searching his missing alligator friend.
- Ice Man (voiced by Travis Turner) is a robot with ice-based abilities who wants to be a hero like Mega Man. However, due to a bug in his system he takes everything literally. Unlike other incarnations of the character, he wears a normal jacket and a small winter hat instead of a parka, leaving his hair visible.
- Blasto Woman (voiced by Kathleen Barr) is a jet aircraft-themed robot and former cargo delivery robot. who seeks money and will take up any contract. She later takes a liking to Mega Mini. In "The Gauntlet" Pt. 2, Mega Mini persuades her to turn against Lord Obsidian.
- Air Man (voiced by Ian Hanlin) is a vain fan-powered robot who considers himself to be the best. He resembles Wind Man, since he has fans on poles connected to his back instead of a fan-shaped torso. The fans on his shoulders help him fly and the fan for his right hand can create tornadoes. In "The Bluster Bunch", it is revealed that his arrogance hides his insecurity caused by his siblings boasting about their successful accomplishments and belittling him.
- Chemistry Man (voiced by Peter New) is a robot who was formerly known as Mr. NRT. He was a chemistry teacher at Silicon Central who was fired by Principal 100100 since his boring lectures put his students to sleep. Sgt. Breaker Night persuaded him to go rogue and gave him the name of Chemistry Man. He can emit bubbles that can affect the systems of humans and robots and is adept at making chemical compounds. His name is a pun on "inert".
- Guts Man (voiced by Peter New) is a garbage-disposal robot with super strength. He can create shock waves by slamming his hands on his robotic stomach and can also grow larger and more powerful upon eating garbage. In later episodes, it is revealed he can eat both organic and inorganic matter to power up.
- Elec Man (voiced by Andrew McNee) is a hyperactive electrical robot who can move at super speed and absorb and blast electricity from his giant plug for a left hand. Similar to the version seen in MegaMan: NT Warrior, he has surge arresters on his back.
- Wood Man (voiced by Mark Oliver) is a robot who was a soldier in the Hard Age and a close ally and fellow soldier of Principal 100100. He eventually comes to grips with the fact the war is over, and after being persuaded to stop attacking by Mega Man, he leaves for the forest and becomes a historian for tourists.
- Junk Man is a remote-controlled robot created by Aki and Suna to act as a practice robot for Rush to fight. Dr. Light later upgrades him to help guard his laboratory.
- Cut Man (voiced by Colin Murdock) – A gardener robot with a bowl cut-shaped head. He is a perfectionist with a short temper, and gets agitated if his work is messed up due to his faulty programming. He can fire small blades from his hands that can cut anything. His real name, Chauncey, is a reference to the protagonist from the movie Being There.

=== Other ===
- Man Man (voiced by Ian Hanlin) is an average man with a poorly constructed outfit who wants to be a hero like Mega Man. His costume is based on the "Bad Box Art Mega Man" from the North American cover of the original game.
- The Bluster Bunch are a trio of air-themed robots that are the siblings of Air Man. They are similar in design, ability, and personality.
  - Mary Flair (voiced by Michael Adamthwaite) is Air Man's sister, who works as an "award-winning special effects artist/director/writer extraordinaire" for weather disaster films. Her fans are a different shape than Air Man's.
  - Volt Aire (voiced by Ian Hanlin) is Air Man's brother, who is an inventor and engineer. Unlike him, he does not have fans. His name is a pun on the French philosopher Voltaire.
  - Captain Dare (voiced by Ian Hanlin) is Air Man's brother, who is a stunt pilot and has a single rocket thruster instead of fans.
- Mrs. CHO (voiced by Lauren Jackson) is a heavyset chemical-themed robot, who is the replacement chemistry teacher at Silicon Central School and is widely loved there.
- Hal (voiced by Brian Drummond) is an elderly robot who invented the Excitron 2000. In his youth, he pulled off the biggest prank at Silicon Central School, called "The Big Fade Away".
- Drill Man Sr. (voiced by Andrew McNee) is the father of Drill Man, who dragged him into the family business.
- Jenny & Max (voiced by Mavis Green and Cole Howard) are identical twins in Silicon City.

== Production and development ==
On June 2, 2015, Capcom partnered with Dentsu Entertainment USA to create a 26-episode animated television series of the company's flagship Mega Man video game franchise after 20 years since the 1994 animated series of the same name had its final run. Under terms of the deal, Dentsu Entertainment holds worldwide broadcast and licensing rights for all aspects of the new Mega Man TV series and handpicks American writing team Man of Action (Joe Casey, Joe Kelly, Duncan Rouleau and Steven T. Seagle), the creators of Ben 10 and Generator Rex, to create, write and executive produce the show.

At the Long Beach Comic Con 2015, Rouleau gave out more details regarding the show's combination of game-based and new material such as the backstories of some characters being different with "a few surprises", creating both new major and minor villains other than Dr. Wily and the Robot Masters and including Easter eggs for fans, while still focusing the show for a new audience. Man of Action also noted they've been working closely with Dentsu Entertainment and Capcom, trying to write stories that will appeal more to western audiences. They also confirmed that the art-style would be much closer to how the characters appear in the games and Capcom's official art rather than the more superhero-like designs of the 1994 series, as noted by Rouleau regarding the visual appearance of Mega Man himself "The Mega Man that you knew and fell in love with is still going to be the same Mega Man. He's going to be the younger version of him, because there are so many variations of who he could be, but we're going with the total, squat, awesome, big-boot, big-gun Mega Man".

On May 26, 2016, DHX Media announced that they would be co-producing the series with Dentsu, as well as handling distribution and licensing for it outside of Asia. An image of the first iteration of the show's design for Mega Man was released alongside the announcement. Later that year, Nerdist conducted an interview with the Man of Action creative crew, where it was said that Mega Man would be "optimistic" in this series, with the show's visual aesthetic drawn by Rouleau in conjunction with Capcom with inspiration by older anime shows like Gigantor and Speed Racer. The outlet initially reported that the series would air on Disney XD, but that was later retracted with Dentsu stating a broadcast on the channel was never confirmed. In late January 2017, footage from an incarnation of the series with the same design leaked through a demo reel posted by animation studio Film Roman. This was later removed, with a representative from Dentsu Entertainment describing it as an internal animation test not reflective of the show's current look. The pilot was leaked online on January 2, 2026.

On April 3, 2017, Dentsu and DHX announced that the series was delayed to 2018 and would premiere on Cartoon Network in the United States (making it the third series based on the franchise to air on the network, after MegaMan NT Warrior and Mega Man Star Force) and Family Chrgd in Canada. It was then revealed that the series would be animated by DHX Studios Vancouver, utilizing computer generated imagery with a heavily revised design. The next month, Jakks Pacific signed on to produce toys based on the series.

At the 2018 Licensing Expo, DHX Media's promotion for the series listed the series under the new title Mega Man: Fully Charged. The show held its premiere at the 2018 San Diego Comic-Con on July 20. The series officially debuted on television in the United States on August 5, 2018, with the first 10 episodes available through on-demand platforms on August 3. Reruns began airing on Boomerang in the United States on August 12. The series was removed from both channels' schedules after 10 weeks, though it eventually returned the following January. The Canadian Family Chrgd broadcast began on September 8, 2018. It premiered on Pop in the United Kingdom on October 1, 2018. In Southeast Asia, the series debuted on Disney XD on June 3, 2019. An Australian premiere on 9Go! followed on July 15.

== Episodes ==
| No. | Title | Directed by | Written by | Storyboarded by | Original release date | Prod. code | U.S. viewers (millions) |
|---|---|---|---|---|---|---|---|
| 1 | "Throwing Shade" | Gino Nichele; Kiran Sangherra and Johnny Darrell (co-directors) | Man of Action | Cody Shaw and Pearl Low | August 5, 2018 (US) (Note: This episode was first released on the Cartoon Network app and website on August 3, 2018.); September 8, 2018 (CAN) | 101 | 0.25 |
| 2 | "Throwing Shade" | Gino Nichele; Kiran Sangherra and Johnny Darrell (co-directors) | Man of Action | Cody Shaw and Pearl Low | August 5, 2018 (US); September 8, 2018 (CAN) | 101 | 0.25 |
"Part 1": Aki saves Silicon City as Mega Man along with his miniature sidekick Mega-Mini. Only his human sister, Suna, knows of his double identity. Their father, Dr. Thomas Light, arrives at school to give a lecture on human and robot relations, but are interrupted by Sgt. Breaker Night, Dr. Light's former medic patient, who considers robots inferior. Fire Man appears and begins to attack Sgt. Night and Dr. Light and Aki transforms to fight him, but during the scuffle is knocked away. "Part 2": Mega Man manages to replicate Fire Man's schematics, but he also replicates his anger, making him unfocused. Sgt. Night tries to push his point forward while Dr. Light and Suna try to help the students. Mega Man returns to battle Fire Man and overcomes his anger when a couple of students thought to have been killed were saved and they and the robots band together to show their unity. Fire Man escapes and returns to his boss who turns out to be Sgt. Night who now plans on defeating Mega Man in order to control Silicon City.
| 3 | "Drilling Deep" | Gino Nichele; Sylvain Blais (co-director) | Man of Action | Steve LeCouilliard and Flora Huang | August 12, 2018 (US); September 9, 2018 (CAN) | 102A | 0.26 |
After an encounter with Drill Man, Aki ends up copying his schematics, but cannot control them and is humiliated at school. Eventually, his friend, Bert Wily, reveals his bad haircut to help Aki and he runs off as Mega Man to stop Drill Man. Mega Man learns that Drill Man wanted to be a musician robot, but his company was bought by Skyraisers Inc. and was forced into the "family business". Mega Man defeats and tries to talk sense into Drill Man, but he escapes. Mega Man chases after him, despite knowing that he will not be found.
| 4 | "Videodrone" | Gino Nichele; Sylvain Blais (co-director) | Marcus Rinehart; Man of Action (story) | Steve LeCouilliard and Flora Huang | August 12, 2018 (US); September 9, 2018 (CAN) | 102B | 0.26 |
Suna criticizes Aki for being hooked on video games instead of studying. While at school, everyone except Aki and Suna are hypnotized by their phones. Aki transforms into Mega Man and he and Suna find the source: a former teacher robot taking the name Hypno Woman. Hypno Woman plans to use her hypnotizing mechanism to "help" people. Eventually, Mega Man and Suna overcome her machine and Mega Man defeats her, though she escapes and vows to get her revenge on him. Having learned his lesson, Aki agrees to study with Suna.
| 5 | "Please Rush Home" | Gino Nichele; Kiran Sangherra (co-director) | Man of Action | Cody Shaw and Pearl Low | August 19, 2018 (US); September 16, 2018 (CAN) | 103A | 0.22 |
After Aki sarcastically criticizes Rush, he runs away from home. Aki transforms into Mega Man to look for him and runs into Wave Man, a sewer sanitation robot, who is flooding the city in search of his lost alligator friend simply named "Alligator". Mega Man is washed away in a flood, but is rescued by Rush and apologizes to him. Mega Man then tricks Wave Man into telling his story so that he can scan his schematics and defeats him. As Wave Man is arrested, Mega Man and Rush make up and race home together.
| 6 | "Blaze of Glory" | Gino Nichele; Kiran Sangherra (co-director) | A.J. Marchisello; Marcus Rinehart (story) | Cody Shaw and Pearl Low | August 19, 2018 (US); September 16, 2018 (CAN) | 103B | 0.22 |
On an incredibly hot day, Suna remarks that Aki cannot understand humans due to his robot programming. Later, all cooling mechanisms throughout the city fail, so Aki becomes Mega Man to investigate with Suna and Bert tailing behind. Mega Man arrives at the cooling plant and discovers Fire Man is the culprit. With Suna and Bert's help, as well as Wave Man's schematics, Mega Man defeats Fire Man and he is arrested. Suna apologizes for her earlier remark and Mega Man accepts his robotic perspective on things.
| 7 | "Nice on Ice" | Gino Nichele; Sylvain Blais (co-director) | Marcus Rinehart; Man of Action (story) | Steve LeCouilliard and Flora Huang | August 26, 2018 (US); September 23, 2018 (CAN) | 104A | 0.32 |
Aki stops by one of Sgt. Night's televised anti-robot speeches and spreads his own positive message. Cryogenic robot Ice Man misinterprets Aki's words and resolves to freeze people together in order to spread harmony. Aki gets caught for nearly cutting class, but has to run again when Ice Man shows up and freezes the students and faculty together. With Suna's help, Aki as Mega Man learns to take things slow and defeats Ice Man. Principal 100100 takes Ice Man away to educate him better on being a good robot.
| 8 | "Hard Times in Silicon City" | Gino Nichele; Sylvain Blais (co-director) | A.J. Marchisello | Steve LeCouilliard and Flora Huang | August 26, 2018 (US); September 23, 2018 (CAN) | 104B | 0.32 |
In order to finish a history report, Suna takes Aki to the museum to be tutored by Peter Punkowski, a nerdy, annoying, know-it-all. During the tour, a mysterious robotic woman asks about the expensive exhibits and reveals herself as Blasto Woman, a robot who is trying to steal the artifacts. Through fighting her, Mega Man realizes that despite his idiosyncrasies, Peter is very informative and remembers the history of certain artifacts. He uses his knowledge to defeat Blasto Woman and she is arrested.
| 9 | "Tripping the Light Fantastic" | Gino Nichele; Kiran Sangherra (co-director) | Michael Oliver; Man of Action (story) | Cody Shaw and Pearl Low | September 2, 2018 (US); October 7, 2018 (CAN) | 105A | 0.30 |
Dr. Light reveals his new date, a woman named Mari. Aki scans her and realizes that she is Hypno Woman in disguise and transforms into Mega Man and follows them. He gets to a club and attempts to ruin their date with no results. Mari reveals herself to Mega Man and tells him to leave them alone. After realizing that Mari had only set up fireworks for her date, Dr. Light reveals that he knew she was Hypno Woman and set up the date in an effort to give her advice. He tells Mega Man to never give up on his ability to see the good in people.
| 10 | "Running Wild" | Gino Nichele; Kiran Sangherra (co-director) | Joe Barnathan; Man of Action (story) | Cody Shaw and Pearl Low | September 2, 2018 (US); October 7, 2018 (CAN) | 105B | 0.30 |
After battling and scanning Air Man, Aki begins exhibiting a vain and arrogant attitude, made more problematic when he runs against Bert and Peter to replace Suna for school president. Aki even tries using his Mega Man persona to get more votes. However, when Air Man arrives and creates havoc, Mega Man snaps out of his arrogance and defeats Air Man by blasting him away. In the end, Aki drops out of the running and Bert ends up winning with everyone, including Peter, happily accepting the outcome.
| 11 | "Unfriendly Competition" | Gino Nichele; Sylvain Blais and Robin; Shea (co-directors) | Justin Peniston; Man of Action (story) | Steve LeCouilliard and Flora Huang | September 9, 2018 (US) (Note: This episode was first released on the Cartoon Network app and website on September 7, 2018.); September 30, 2018 (CAN) | 106A | 0.23 |
Bert announces that he is joining the field day track team with his new robotic legs and speed button. Aki thinks the idea is dumb and makes fun of his new invention. Suddenly, Silicon Central School is attacked by its former chemistry teacher Mr. NRT, now going by the name Chemistry Man and Aki becomes Mega Man to stop him. Chemistry Man wants the entire school under his control so that he can teach. Eventually, Mega Man realizes that he talks too slow and gives him the speed button causing him to malfunction. Principal 100100 takes the opportunity to tell Chemistry Man that he is still fired. Afterwards, Aki praises Bert's invention.
| 12 | "Opposites Attract" | Gino Nichele; Sylvain Blais and Robin; Shea (co-directors) | Janis Robertson; Man of Action (story) | Steve LeCouilliard and Flora Huang | September 9, 2018 (US); September 30, 2018 (CAN) | 106B | 0.23 |
The Light Family head to the lake for the weekend, but find it dried up. While Dr. Light is busy building sand castles, Aki and Suna discover that Fire Man and Wave Man are working together to create a cloudy day for "the boss". Aki becomes Mega Man, but he and Suna cannot get along to find out to defeat Fire Man and Wave Man. Eventually, the two realize that their relationship is uneven and trick the robots into fighting each other. They trick them into getting sucked into their own machine and blast them away. Aki and Suna make up and return home with Dr. Light.
| 13 | "I.C.E. (In Case of Emergency)" | Gino Nichele; Sylvain Blais (co-director) | Marcus Rinehart | Steve LeCouilliard and Flora Huang | September 16, 2018 (US); October 14, 2018 (CAN) | 107A | 0.26 |
Mega Man discovers that Ice Man has turned to heroics causing him to doubt himself. Combined with Ice Man's schematics, Mega Man as Aki begins to take things literally when Ice Man tells him to leave it to the professionals. Suna tries to get him to go back to normal, but Mega-Mini cannot thaw the programming. Ice Man begins taking his heroics too far and begins freezing innocents. Suna finally reaches Aki by reminding him why he is Mega Man to begin with. He jumps back into action and stops Ice Man. Mega Man convinces the Good Guild to give Ice Man another chance at being a hero.
| 14 | "Trust Your Guts, Man!" | Gino Nichele; Sylvain Blais (co-director) | A.J. Marchisello | Steve LeCouilliard and Flora Huang | September 16, 2018 (US); October 14, 2018 (CAN) | 107B | 0.26 |
Sgt. Night approaches obsolete garbage bot Guts Man and offers him a chance to be a "Robot Master". Guts Man approaches the Light residence as Gustav Gütsman with an invention that turns waste into edible byproducts. When he sees that Dr. Light invented a mechanism that turns waste into a renewable energy source, he becomes offended and fills himself on garbage to break down Dr. Light's lab. Mega Man tries attacking him until he realizes that in order to defeat him he needs to give him exactly what he wants. Guts Man becomes full on garbage and gets a cramp resulting in his defeat.
| 15 | "Drill of the Hunt" | Gino Nichele; Kiran Sangherra (co-director) | Kevin Somers; Man of Action (story) | Cody Shaw and Pearl Low | September 23, 2018 (US) (Note: This episode was first released on the Cartoon Network app and website on September 21, 2018.); October 21, 2018 (CAN) | 108A | 0.25 |
While fighting Drill Man, Mega Man gets the idea to use Hypno Woman's schematics to hypnotize Drill Man into becoming good. Suna does not find this effectual as it removes the necessary progression of humanizing Drill Man. Mega Man as Aki begins unintentionally hypnotizing others to go with his suggestions rather than their own. They build a new performing theater for Drill Man to perform, but the awful music awakens Drill Man from his hypnotism and he starts attacking Mega Man. After defeating him, Mega Man apologizes to Drill Man for trying to change him and he forgives him.
| 16 | "Power Cycle" | Gino Nichele; Kiran Sangherra (co-director) | Lawrence H. Levy; Man of Action (story) | Cody Shaw and Pearl Low | September 23, 2018 (US); October 21, 2018 (CAN) | 108B | 0.25 |
Mega Man continues to fight crime without rest, concerning Suna who tells him he needs to take a break every now and then. Sgt. Night sends Elec Man to steal energy from Silicon City's power grid. When Mega Man absorbs Elec Man's schematics, he suddenly is overcome with a burst of energy and stops him. However, he continues to act energetic making his next battle with Elec Man one sided. Eventually, Suna gets Mega Man to discharge some of his energy and he defeats Elec Man followed by a good nap. Elec Man returns to Sgt. Night who is clearly disappointed with him.
| 17 | "Bored to Be Wild" | Gino Nichele; Sylvain Blais (co-director) | Kevin Grevioux; Man of Action (story) | Dennis Crawford and Flora Huang | September 30, 2018 (US); October 28, 2018 (CAN) | 109A | 0.22 |
Aki has classmate Ashley Adderley tutor him with chemistry while Suna and Dr. Light are away. They head to the museum to see an art exhibit based around Mega Man, but suddenly the ground turns to rubber. Chemistry Man puts Mega Man to the test by solving riddles. Due to his inability to answer, Ashley comes in annoying Mega Man. With no other choice, he invites her to help solve the riddles and both realize that Chemistry Man is hiding in a giant statue of Mega Man. Mega Man defeats him and thanks Ashley who has not figured out that he and Aki are the same person.
| 18 | "Enter the Wood Man" | Gino Nichele; Sylvain Blais (co-director) | Beata Harju; Man of Action (story) | Dennis Crawford and Flora Huang | September 30, 2018 (US); October 28, 2018 (CAN) | 109B | 0.22 |
While doing a project in the woods, Mega Man and Suna are attacked by Wood Man, a robot who fought during the Hard Age alongside Principal 100100. While Mega Man fends him off, Suna gets information from 100100 who informs Mega Man about Wood Man's history. Wood Man heads into the city and begins attacking civilians. Not wanting to use his Fire Man schematics to defeat him, Mega Man manages to get through to Wood Man who sees the error of his ways, but cannot assimilate into his new surroundings. He instead returns to the forest to act as a historian for tourists.
| 19 | "Lightfall" | Clint Butler; Kiran Sangherra (co-director) | Marcus Rinehart; Man of Action (story) | Cody Shaw and Pearl Low | October 7, 2018 (US) (Note: These episodes were first released on the Cartoon Network app and website on October 5, 2018.); November 4, 2018 (CAN) | 110A | 0.23 |
| 20 | "Lightfall" | Clint Butler; Kiran Sangherra (co-director) | A.J. Marchisello; Man of Action (story) | Cody Shaw and Pearl Low | October 7, 2018 (US); November 4, 2018 (CAN) | 110B | 0.23 |
"Part 1": When Fire Man doubts Sgt. Night's leadership, he berates him for questioning him. Mega Man attends the Unity Day Festival where he begins stroking his own ego. He gets a message from Lord Obsidian who calls Mega Man a traitor for battling other robots and he takes his offer to fight him, much to Suna's dismay. Principal 100100 speaks with Mega Man and tries giving him advice. Afterwards, Mega Man battles Obsidian and is easily defeated by him. Later, it is implied that Obsidian and Sgt. Night are one and the same. Suna rescues Mega Man and he agrees to come up with a plan with her. "Part 2": Mega Man and Mega Mini train by practicing the ability to cycle through their schematics. Obsidian arrives at the Lighthouse to find the Mega Key, a device that gives people total control over robots. While fighting him, Rush take the blast from one of Obsidian's guns angering Mega Man who then proceeds to use his new technique to finally defeat him. At the last minute, a new robot dubbed Namagem arrives and rescues Obsidian who returns to his base where Fire Man, Drill Man, and Wave Man are startled by his loss. Rush is fixed and given his own armor and now joins Mega Man on his missions to fight crime.
| 21 | "Rush to Greatness" | Clint Butler; Gino Nichele (co-director) | Sean Patrick Geraghty; Man of Action (story) | Dennis Crawford and Flora Huang | November 11, 2018 (CAN); January 5, 2019 (US) (Note: This episode was first released on the Cartoon Network app and website on January 4, 2019.) | 111A | 0.39 |
Aki enjoys Rush's new abilities as he surveys the city as Mega Man, but becomes saddened as Rush still acts like a dog and might be afraid of being a hero. Aki and Suna decide to create a robot for Rush to fight whom they dub Junk Man. Meanwhile, Rush spots Wave Man attacking the city on TV and transforms to go and fight him. Despite Wave Man's attempts to talk down to Rush about him being nothing more than a dog, Rush overcomes his insecurities and defeats the villain. Mega Man arrives late, but is overjoyed upon learning that Rush had defeated him by himself making him a true hero.
| 22 | "SWISH" | Clint Butler; Gino Nichele (co-director) | Justin Peniston; Man of Action (story) | Dennis Crawford and Flora; Huang | November 11, 2018 (CAN); January 6, 2019 (US) | 111B | 0.22 |
An overzealous Namagem wants to battle Mega Man, but Sgt. Night says he is not ready. Aki tries to sneak into Dr. Light's lab, but is caught and reprimanded. While in the city, Mega Man and Rush are attacked by Namagem and the two learn that he can carry up to four schematics as opposed to three. As Mega Man gets badly beaten, he tasks Rush with retrieving S.W.I.S.H., a new device that projects a force field. They overheat Namagem's blaster and he flees. While Mega Man accepts that he is not ready for Dr. Light's lab, Namagem plots against Sgt. Night's wishes after he had warned him that he wasn't ready.
| 23 | "Minus Mini" | Clint Butler; Kiran Sangherra (co-director) | A.J. Marchisello | Cody Shaw and Pearl Low | November 18, 2018 (CAN); January 12, 2019 (US) | 112A | 0.38 |
While battling Blasto Woman, Mega Mini is accidentally knocked out of Mega Man's head. Blasto Woman spots him and picks him up with the intent to sell him on the black market. Meanwhile, Aki begins glitching up and acting strange with Suna discovering that Mega Mini is gone and further discover security footage of Blasto Woman kidnapping him. Mega Man, Suna, and Rush find Blasto Woman and battle her, but Mega Man cannot stop glitching up. It is revealed that Mega Mini messed with Blasto Woman's schematics and she is defeated by the heroes. Mega Mini returns to Mega Man and manages to repair his damages.
| 24 | "A Cut Above" | Clint Butler; Kiran Sangherra (co-director) | Jeff Treppel; Man of Action (story) | Cody Shaw and Pearl Low | November 18, 2018 (CAN); January 13, 2019 (US) | 112B | 0.20 |
While messing with the Suna-Copter, Aki and Bert accidentally destroy a bonsai tree belonging to the Light Family's personal robotic gardener, Chauncey. Upset over his loss, he is approached by Lord Obsidian who outfits him with upgrades. As Dr. Light makes the discovery that Chauncey has faulty programming that makes him an obsessed perfectionist, he returns as Cut Man to get his revenge. Eventually, Mega Man begins fighting him until Suna returns with the repaired bonsai tree. Cut Man suddenly becomes remorseful of his actions and decides to take Dr. Light's offer of robotic therapy.
| 25 | "A Bot and His Dog" | Clint Butler; Gino Nichele and Robin; Shea (co-directors) | Marcus Rinehart | Dennis Crawford and Flora; Huang | November 25, 2018 (CAN); January 19, 2019 (US) | 113A | 0.35 |
Mega Man gives out the Mega Man Emergency Code to the public, but it results in him doing low-stakes house calls that he feels are beneath him. He suddenly gets a contact from Hypno Woman who has him come to the power plant where she has hypnotized the workers to shut down the city. Despite Mega Man warning her of an overload, she continues with her plan. Suna gets Rush to give Mega Man his Hypno Woman schematic and the two of them (who are immune to Hypno Woman's powers) team up and defeat her. Mega Man realizes that it is important to care about the minute details and he happily returns to his calls.
| 26 | "This Man, This Man Man" | Clint Butler; Gino Nichele and Robin; Shea (co-directors) | Rocco Pucillo; Man of Action (story) | Dennis Crawford and Flora Huang | November 25, 2018 (CAN); January 20, 2019 (US) | 113B | 0.20 |
While on his way to school to meet with Ashley about a drone project, Aki transforms into Mega Man when the city is apparently under attack. He ends up meeting Man Man, a clumsy DIY superhero and they trace Guts Man to the school where he intends to complete his task of eating ingredients to make himself stronger. Mega Man is upset with Man Man's interference, but a sudden unintended blunder on Man Man's part allows the two of them to defeat Guts Man with the two reconciling. Mega Man makes it to class on time and he uses Man Man's gum technique to fix the drone which earns him and Ashley an A+.
| 27 | "A Guilded Cage" | Clint Butler and Kiran Sangherra (co-director) | Ricky Mammone; Man of Action (story) | Cody Shaw and Pearl Low | January 26, 2019 (US); March 11, 2019 (CAN) | 114A | 0.28 |
Aki gets hooked on mystery films and begins talking like a detective. While in town, he discovers that the Good Guild is now causing trouble. He immediately switches to Mega Man and believes that Hypno Woman is behind the change in the Good Guild's behavior. He talks to Dr. Light about it, but he insists that Hypno Woman is innocent. He locates her hideout and discovers that she is indeed innocent and has been trying to use her abilities for good, but someone replicated them. Mega Man deduces Namagem is the culprit and finds him attacking the lighthouse with the hypnotized Guild and successfully stops him.
| 28 | "To Air Is Robot" | Clint Butler and Kiran Sangherra (co-director) | Dan Goldman; Man of Action (story) | Cody Shaw and Pearl Low | January 27, 2019 (US); March 12, 2019 (CAN) | 114B | 0.19 |
Air Man begins wreaking havoc across Silicon City with the intent to take down buildings that he claims are blocking people from noticing his greatness. Mega Man hops into action with the Air Man schematics despite the fact that they cause him to become cocky and arrogant. He fails to take him down, resulting the denizens constantly suffering from his attacks while Aki begins belittling those around him. He finally overcomes the schematics and faces Air Man has himself when he attacks the lighthouse. Mega Man tricks Air Man into flying into space where he ends up enjoying the view so everyone can see him.
| 29 | "Watt's Happening" | Clint Butler; Gino Nichele and Kiran Sangherra (co-directors) | A.J. Marchisello | Dennis Crawford and Flora Huang | February 3, 2019 (US); March 13, 2019 (CAN) | 115A | 0.19 |
While Sgt. Night has Elec Man install a power battery on a satellite dish, Aki learns that Ashley has created a play around Mega Man that will be broadcast across Silicon City. Aki decides that he will audition for the lead role which Ashley at first shoots down for not having the "it factor", but Aki trains and eventually wins the role. On the night of the play, Elec Man disrupts the show and Aki is forced to become Mega Man for real, battling him on stage. Mega Man defeats Elec Man using the very battery that he was going to use and saves Ashley, ultimately making the show a big success.
| 30 | "Chill Out, Bruh" | Clint Butler; Gino Nichele and Kiran Sangherra (co-directors) | M.J. Offen | Dennis Crawford and Flora Huang | February 10, 2019 (US); March 14, 2019 (CAN) | 115B | 0.22 |
Mega Man and Dr. Light manage to rehabilitate Ice Man by giving him a thermometer that balances his emotions. Aki accidentally schedules himself and Suna looking after Ice Man on the day of air hockey captain try outs. Sgt. Night arrives and insults the siblings while secretly attaching a device onto Ice Man that causes him to act erratic over time. At the try outs, Aki and Suna get into an argument with Peter, resulting in Ice Man attacking everyone. Mega Man spots the device affecting Ice Man and has Mega Mini remove it. Afterwards, the group suspect Sgt. Night and Jacques the toaster becomes captain.
| 31 | "Big Bad Dreams" | Clint Butler; Gino Nichele and Robin Shea (co-directors) | Marcus Rinehart; Man of Action (story) | Cody Shaw and Pearl Low | February 17, 2019 (US); March 15, 2019 (CAN) | 116A | 0.20 |
Aki begins having nightmares about Namagem attacking him which also affects Mega Mini. Sgt. Night has been having Namagem using Hypno Woman's schematics to affect Aki in his dreams which cause him to Meganize in real life. Aki begins dozing off during the day and seeing Namagem affecting him and soon becomes afraid of him. As Mega Man he goes to Dr. Light who tells him that Namagem is just his reflection and to overcome his fear. Once again, Aki confronts Namagem and turns his power around making Namagem afraid (with his fear of disappointing Sgt. Night) and defeating him.
| 32 | "License to Drill" | Clint Butler; Gino Nichele and Robin Shea (co-directors) | Marcus Rinehart | Cody Shaw and Pearl Low | February 24, 2019 (US); March 16, 2019 (CAN) | 116B | 0.19 |
Bert is working to perfect his hoverboard to train for the sport of Hover-Surfing, but Aki insists on making it cool. He upsets Bert further when he calls his board boring. Aki sees Drill Man trying to construct a tower in an effort to cover Silicon City with drill themed buildings. Mega Man battles him, but cannot defeat him, so he calls upon Bert and his hoverboard, resulting in him taking out Drill Man's fellow drill bots and Mega Man to face Drill Man. They destroy the foundation and defeat Drill Man. Afterwards, Aki approaches Bert and apologizes for his teasing behavior.
| 33 | "All Good in the Wood" | Clint Butler; Gino Nichele and Robin Shea (co-directors) | A.J. Marchisello; Man of Action (story) | Dennis Crawford and Flora Huang | March 3, 2019 (US) (Note: This episode was first released on the Cartoon Network app and website on March 1, 2019.); March 17, 2019 (CAN) | 117A | 0.29 |
Suna and Ashley work on their bio-mechanical science project, but try to keep it a secret from Aki. When he hears them mention Wood Man, he heads into the woods as Mega Man where he replicates his schematics during a friendly spar. Aside from the schematics, Mega Man also picks up on his paranoia and begins to become suspicious of everyone. Suna and Ashley's project ends up growing into a large blob that runs amok. Suna gets through to Mega Man by telling him a secret (Ashley thinks he's cute) and he and Wood Man team up to defeat the blob with Mega Man learning to be more trusting of his friends.
| 34 | "Fire Man in the Hole" | Clint Butler; Gino Nichele and Robin Shea (co-directors) | Greg Hart; Man of Action (story) | Dennis Crawford and Flora Huang | March 10, 2019 (US); March 24, 2019 (CAN) | 117B | 0.23 |
While on a hiking trip, a volcanic quake causes Ashley to drop her camera into a pit. Aki jumps in to retrieve it and transforms into Mega Man. He encounters Fire Man who is absorbing the lava for Sgt. Night so that they can break into the lighthouse. Mega Man and Fire Man fight, but the constant interior destruction results in the lava blocking their exit. They decide to work together and divert the lava with Mega Man telling Fire Man that he is proud of him, though he leaves. Suna and Ashley send a drone to get Aki and he returns the camera. Ashley sees Mega Man in the video and becomes suspicious, but ignores it.
| 35 | "A Split End" | Clint Butler; Kiran Sangherra and Robin Shea (co-directors) | A.J. Marchisello | Cody Shaw and Pearl Low | March 11, 2019 (US); March 31, 2019 (CAN) | 118A | 0.28 |
Aki remembers that picture day is tomorrow and needs a new haircut. He heads to the local salon and discovers that Cut Man has taken to being a chic hairdresser with his simplistic hairstyles. Not wanting to wait in line, Mega Man copies his schematics, but becomes a perfectionist bordering on OCD. When a customer comes back with a minor problem, Cut Man once again goes wild and Mega Man battles him in the streets. He eventually realizes that being perfect is problematic and reverts to normal, but Sgt. Night has Namagem arrive and take Cut Man back before Mega Man can defeat him and Aki sticks with his haircut.
| 36 | "All Play and No Work" | Clint Butler; Kiran Sangherra and Robin Shea (co-directors) | Bob Fingerman; Man of Action (story) | Cody Shaw and Pearl Low | March 12, 2019 (US); March 24, 2019 (CAN) | 118B | 0.20 |
Aki has been stressed from all the crime-fighting he has been doing. He decides to loosen up with the arrival of a prankster robot named Chaotique who seems to be only interested in harmless shenanigans. However, she frames Bert with stolen goods and Mega Man battles her across the city. He cannot defeat her due to her speed, but he realizes that she is ego driven. He pretends to make the claim that Bert was responsible for all of Chaotique's antics, resulting in her admitting to the thefts. She still escapes, but not before hinting to Mega Man that she knows his secret identity.
| 37 | "More More More!" | Clint Butler; Kiran Sangherra and Robin Shea (co-directors) | Joe Barnathan | Dennis Crawford; Flora Huang and Tom Sales | March 13, 2019 (US); March 31, 2019 (CAN) | 119A | 0.22 |
Mega Man encounters Guts Man while he is stealing a truck full of gold. He decides to copy his schematics which allow him to defeat him, but also causes him to work up a voracious appetite. The more Aki eats, the bigger he becomes which upsets Suna. Meanwhile, Sgt. Night as Lord Obsidian collects the Robot Masters to put up a wall through Silicon City that separates humans and robots. Suna convinces a giant Aki to become Mega Man who runs into the city to eat. Through Mega Mini's thinking, Mega Man instead attacks Lord Obsidian and the Robot Masters, who escape, and he blasts the wall down, returning him to normal.
| 38 | "Blast Resort" | Clint Butler; Kiran Sangherra and Robin Shea (co-directors) | Marcus Rinehart | Dennis Crawford; Flora Huang and Tom Sales | March 14, 2019 (US); April 7, 2019 (CAN) | 119B | 0.23 |
Mega Man is lured to the bank where he runs into Blasto Woman who invites him to do a heist with her. An EMP is being transported and the buyer is Lord Obsidian. While reluctant to trust her, he goes through with it anyway and they are successful getting the device. However, Blasto Woman traps Mega Man in the EMP so that she can deliver him to Obsidian. Suna arrives and rescues Mega Man and together they out do Blasto Woman and escape. Blasto Woman comes back to Obsidian who had her under contract. He offers her to work for him or otherwise be his enemy. She chooses the former.
| 39 | "Too Much Is Never Enough" | Clint Butler; Gino Nichele and Kiran Sangherra (co-directors) | A.J. Marchisello and Tanner Marchisello | Cody Shaw and Pearl Low | March 15, 2019 (US); April 14, 2019 (CAN) | 120A | 0.31 |
After another fight with Namagem, Mega Man learns from Dr. Light that he has a safeguard that prevents him from having more than three schematics. He has Mega Mini remove the safeguard, and tries to carry all of them, but he begins going through personality mood shifts and argues with Suna. He runs into Obsidian who has him battle Namagem, but be begins to overload. Suna arrives and with her support, Mega Man drops his schematics and defeats Namagem in base form with Suna and Rush's help. Afterwards, Mega Man apologizes to Suna about her behavior and once again does not know Namagem's name.
| 40 | "The Bluster Bunch" | Clint Butler; Gino Nichele and Kiran Sangherra (co-directors) | Rocco Pucillo; Man of Action (story) | Cody Shaw and Pearl Low | March 24, 2019 (US); April 21, 2019 (CAN) | 120B | 0.23 |
Mega Man tries to get used to the altering of his schematics when a series of wind storms blow across the city interrupting other robots' work. Mary Flair, a film director; Volt Aire, a wind generator inventor; and Captain Dare, a stunt pilot. Mega Man and Suna realize that they are related and that Air Man, who has been sabotaging their work, is their sibling. Mega Man and Air Man fight with the former becoming self-deprecating. Realizing that Air Man feels the same way, Mega Man tells him that he does not need his siblings' approval. He agrees, but leaves as he still has plans for Mega Man.
| 41 | "It's Chemistry, Man" | Clint Butler; Gino Nichele and Kiran Sangherra (co-directors) | Patricia Villetto; Man of Action (story) | Dennis Crawford and Flora Huang | March 31, 2019 (US) (Note: These episodes were first released on the Cartoon Network app and video-on-demand services on March 29, 2019.); April 28, 2019 (CAN) | 121A | 0.19 |
The students at Silicon Central get a cool new chemistry teacher named Ms. CHO who everyone adores. While getting a teacher of the month trophy, the ceremony is interrupted by the arrival of Chemistry Man who turns Principal 100100 into platinum in an effort to kidnap him. Mega Man teams up with Ms. CHO and Ashley to create a serum and turn 100100 back to normal. While trying to show off to Ashley, Mega Man gets turned to platinum. Luckily, Ms. CHO is able to create a serum that turns him and 100100 back to normal in time to stop Chemistry Man who is shocked that Ms. CHO made one so easily. Principal 100100 states to Chemistry Man that he is still fired for the last time as he is arrested by the Good Guild.
| 42 | "Flower Power" | Clint Butler; Gino Nichele and Kiran Sangherra (co-directors) | Dan Marmor; Man of Action (story) | Dennis Crawford and Flora Huang | April 7, 2019 (US); May 5, 2019 (CAN) | 121B | 0.24 |
A rare and noxious flower called the Corpse Flower is stinking up Silicon City where its pollen is causing Aki to sneeze and speak in rhyme. Wood Man, who calls the flower Steve, makes off with it while making the rest of the city sick. Mega Man gives chase all the while trying to control his sneezing and unusual rhyming. Eventually, he makes it to the woods where he and Wood Man continue the fight. Just as Mega Man is about to blow the stench away, Dr. Light and Suna arrive to stop him. The flower begins to bloom a pleasant odor and Mega Man is able to spread it across the city.
| 43 | "Enemy of My Enemy" | Clint Butler; Gino Nichele, Kiran Sangherra and Robin Shea (co-directors) | Marcus Rinehart; Man of Action (story) | Cody Shaw and Pearl Low | April 14, 2019 (US); May 12, 2019 (CAN) | 122A | 0.19 |
As Mega Man and Dr. Light fail to trace the origin of Namagem, Sgt. Night pits him and Fire Man against one another when the two of them get into another argument. Mega Man decides to take Dr. Light's advice and tries talking to Namagem, but he is uninterested in wanting to listen to him. Mega Man decides to instead talk to Fire Man due to the events of "Fire Man in the Hole". The two team up and blast Namagem with fire, revealing a human looking scarred eye. They knock him down, but Namagem blasts Fire Man before escaping. As Mega Man tries to help Fire Man, he promises to get back at Namagem.
| 44 | "Old School" | Clint Butler; Gino Nichele, Kiran Sangherra and Robin Shea (co-directors) | Man of Action; Ian Drazen | Cody Shaw and Pearl Low | April 21, 2019 (US); May 19, 2019 (CAN) | 122B | 0.24 |
The school is visited by an elderly slow speaking robot named Hal who reveals his old invention the Excitron 2000 which can make things disappear. Chatoique arrives and steals the transponders so that she can recreate Hal's old prank by making the school disappear, all the while believing that Mega Man is Peter Punkowski. Mega Man hurriedly ignores Hal, but at the last minute learns that using his Ice Man schematics can bring things back into existence. A disappointed Chaotique escapes, but not before realizing she was wrong about Mega Man's identity. Mega Man decides to listen to Hal's stories.
| 45 | "This Is Not a Drill" | Clint Butler; Gino Nichele and Kiran Sangherra (co-directors) | A.J. Marchisello and Tanner Marchisello | Dennis Crawford and Flora Huang | April 28, 2019 (US) (Note: These episodes were first released on the Cartoon Network app and video-on-demand services on April 26, 2019.); May 26, 2019 (CAN) | 123A | 0.23 |
Aki gets into a small argument with Dr. Light and leaves to go on patrol. As Mega Man, he runs into Drill Man who is trying to destroy the tunnel that his father, Drill Man Sr., is working on. When Sr. shows up, he and Drill Man get into another argument and the two of them, plus Mega Man, fall into the tunnels where they all fight one another. Dr. Light shows up to help Mega Man and use a polymer to stick Drill Man and his father together, but accidentally stick themselves as well. Nevertheless, Mega Man and Dr. Light defeat Drill Man and Sr. and Dr. Light explains that fathers still love their sons.
| 46 | "A Man Man for All Seasons" | Clint Butler; Gino Nichele and Kiran Sangherra (co-directors) | Marcus Rinehart | Dennis Crawford and Flora Huang | May 5, 2019 (US); June 2, 2019 (CAN) | 123B | 0.20 |
Mega Man gets blasted by the Hoover Gang's Chowderizer due to the interference of Man Man. Because of this, Aki's systems are all messed up and he cannot transform into Mega Man. He constructs a suit to try and stop the Hoover Gang, but fails. Ultimately, Man Man arrives to tell Mega Man that even though he has no powers, he continues to fight because it is right. They find the Hoover Gang, but they have run afoul of Blasto Woman. Mega Man gets his powers back just in time for him and Man Man to successfully take out the Hoover Gang and defeat Blasto Woman once again.
| 47 | "Change the Charge" | Clint Butler; Gino Nichele and Kiran Sangherra (co-directors) | Henry Stukenbog; Man of Action (story) | Cody Shaw and Pearl Low | May 12, 2019 (US); June 8, 2019 (CAN) | 124A | 0.22 |
While trying to stop Elec Man using his Ice Man schematics, Mega Man is hit with an electric charge and suddenly begins taking things literally again. He becomes convinced that Elec Man wants to be good. He seizes the opportunity to have him help him set up charge points throughout the city. He sets them off so that Namagem can use Hypno Woman's schematics to control all the robots in the city. Mega Man comes to his senses and has Elec Man overcharge the core so that all the robots return to normal. As Lord Obsidian decides to look for the Mega Key, he knows that Mega Man is Aki.
| 48 | "Hide and Secrets" | Clint Butler; Gino Nichele and Kiran Sangherra (co-directors) | A.J. Marchisello and Tanner Marchisello | Cody Shaw and Pearl Low | May 19, 2019 (US); June 9, 2019 (CAN) | 124B | 0.18 |
As Suna comforts Aki about his double life, Namagem attacks them forcing Aki to change into Mega Man. Suna leads Namagem away, but Mega Man, under the influence of the Wood Man schematics, becomes susceptible to Namagem influence and decides to get the Mega Key to defeat him, despite Suna warning him against going to get it. As Mega Man sends Rush to help Suna, Mega Man manages to get into Dr. Light's lab so that he can get the key, however a prerecorded message from Dr. Light convinces him otherwise and he returns to help Suna defeat Namagem, knowing he can trust family.
| 49 | "Make the Cut" | Clint Butler; Gino Nichele (co-director) | Greg Hart; Man of Action (story) | Dennis Crawford and Flora Huang | May 20, 2019 (US); June 15, 2019 (CAN) | 125A | 0.29 |
Mega Man gets super tired after having spent several days straight fighting crime. As Aki, he has to complete a project with Suna and Ashley over the weekend at Silicon Central. Meanwhile, Lord Obsidian sends Cut Man on one final mission to hunt down the Light children. Aki steps out as Mega Man when he sees that the city has been messed up, but Cut Man arrives at the school and begins attacking Suna and Ashley, Mega Man returns in time to stop him, by dumping paint on him. Aki apologizes for overworking, but Suna is glad he is back. Obsidian accepts Cut Man for determination despite failing his mission.
| 50 | "Panic in the Lighthouse" | Clint Butler; Gino Nichele (co-director) | Marcus Rinehart; Man of Action (story) | Dennis Crawford and Flora Huang | May 21, 2019 (US); June 16, 2019 (CAN) | 125B | 0.24 |
Aki is weary that Dr. Light might learn that he is Mega Man. Lord Obsidian finds Chaotique and persuades her to break into the lighthouse and steal the Mega Key simply to get back at Mega Man. Chaotique breaks into the lab, but sets off the defenses including an upgraded Junk Man. Mega Man rushes in and tries to convince her to rebel again admitting that he sees her as a friend. Chaotique is injured, but fixed by Dr. Light with the real Mega Key and released the next day. The "decoy" turns out to be a memory chip for Aki, revealing that Dr. Light always knew he was Mega Man.
| 51 | "The Gauntlet" | Clint Butler and Kiran Sangherra | A.J. Marchisello; Tanner Marchisello; Man of Action (story) | Cody Shaw and Pearl Low | May 22, 2019 (US); June 22, 2019 (CAN) | 126A | 0.26 |
| 52 | "The Gauntlet" | Clint Butler and Kiran Sangherra | Marcus Rinehart; Man of Action (story) | Cody Shaw and Pearl Low | May 23, 2019 (US); June 22, 2019 (CAN) | 126B | 0.23 |
"Part 1": Now that Aki knows of Dr. Light's knowledge of him being Mega Man all this time, he is unsure if Dr. Light will still love him as a son. Lord Obsidian and Namagem arrive at the lighthouse together with Guts Man, Elec Man, Wave Man, Cut Man, Air Man, Chemistry Man, Drill Man and Blasto Woman. The family step outside to stop the Robot Masters with Suna donning a purple helmet and hover bike and Dr. Light revealing his fighting prowess. Mega Mini jumps off of Mega Man to get to Blasto Woman. With the Robot Masters mostly taken out, Obsidian and Namagem break into Dr. Light's lab with Mega Man in hot pursuit. "Part 2": Blasto Woman switches sides thanks to Mega Mini and leaves the battle. The Mega Key is moved as Mega Man begins to take on Obsidian and Namagem while the rest of the Robot Masters are rounded up by the Good Guild. With his family in danger, Mega Man adds all of his schematics at once and takes on a powerful form that destroys Obsidian's armor, revealing him as Sgt. Night. He wanted the Mega Key to turn all robots into tools of war, infuriating Namagem. Mega Man puts in his memory chip on his father's request, learning that Namagem is his twin brother who was lost, stolen, during the war. Namagem leaves to find himself, and Sgt. Night is arrested for his crimes by the Good Guild.

== Comic book miniseries ==
On May 19, 2020, it was announced that the series would be continued as a six-issue comic book miniseries written by creators A. J. Marchisello and Marcus Rinehart, drawn by Stefano Simeone, and published by Boom! Studios.
