= Dead Dead Demon's Dededede Destruction =

Japanese manga series

- First tankōbon volume cover, featuring Kadode Koyama

デッドデッドデーモンズデデデデデストラクション (Deddo Deddo Dēmonzu Dededededesutorakushon)
- Genre: Post-apocalyptic; Science fiction; Slice of life
- Manga
- Written by: Inio Asano
- Published by: Shogakukan
- English publisher: NA: Viz Media
- Magazine: Big Comic Spirits
- Original run: April 28, 2014 – February 28, 2022
- Volumes: 12
- Anime film series
- Directed by: Tomoyuki Kurokawa
- Written by: Reiko Yoshida
- Music by: Taro Umebayashi
- Studio: Production +h.
- Released: March 22, 2024 – May 24, 2024
- Runtime: 120 minutes (each)
- Films: 2
- Original net animation
- Directed by: Tomoyuki Kurokawa
- Written by: Reiko Yoshida; Takaaki Suzuki
- Music by: Taro Umebayashi
- Studio: Production +h.
- Licensed by: Crunchyroll
- Released: May 24, 2024 – September 20, 2024
- Episodes: 18
- icon

Dead Dead Demon's Dededede Destruction (Japanese: デッドデッドデーモンズデデデデデストラクション, Hepburn: Deddo Deddo Dēmonzu Dededede Desutorakushon), also abbreviated as DDDD, is a Japanese manga series written and illustrated by Inio Asano. It was serialized in Shogakukan's seinen manga magazine Big Comic Spirits from April 2014 to February 2022, with its chapters collected in 12 tankōbon volumes. Viz Media licensed the manga for English release in North America. The story follows two young women, initially high school seniors and later college students, struggling with the mundanity of life after an alien spaceship appears over Japan.

A two-part anime film adaptation produced by Production +h. premiered its first part in March 2024, with the second part premiering in May of the same year. An 18-episode original net animation (ONA) series edition of the films streamed worldwide on Crunchyroll from May to September 2024.

By March 2022, Dead Dead Demon's Dededede Destruction had over 3 million copies in circulation. In 2021, the manga won the 66th Shogakukan Manga Award in the general category, as well as the Excellence Award of the 25th Japan Media Arts Festival in 2022.

== Plot ==
Three years before the events of the story, on August 31, an alien spaceship appeared over Tokyo. Although it has not attacked, the Japanese government, seeing it as a potential threat, unsuccessfully tries to destroy it. The situation leads to a cold war between the humans on Earth and the invaders in the mothership above the Tokyo skyline. There is further conflict between political groups who want to eliminate the aliens, called "warctopuses," and those who want to negotiate peace, called "peacesquids". Despite the tense and precarious state of the world, high school students Koyama Kadode and Nakagawa Ouran live their lives with some semblance of normalcy. The focus of the story is not on the alien invasion but on human nature and growing up in a turbulent and uncertain world.

== Characters ==
The cast of Dead Dead Demon's Dededede Destruction (from left to right): Kadode Koyama, Ai Demoto, Ouran Nakagawa, Rin Hirama, and Kiho Kurihara

=== Main characters ===
Kadode Koyama (小山 門出, Koyama Kadode)
Voiced by: Lilas Ikuta (Japanese); Elyse Maloway (English)
A third-year high school student and later university student who is a fan of the in-universe manga Isobeyan. She is of average height, has short black hair, and wears red glasses. Kadode has been best friends with Ouran since she was ten years old and calls her "Ontan". Despite her father, Nobuo, going missing on 8/31 and her friend Kiho dying in an incident involving an invader spacecraft, she has little interest in politics or the invaders.
Ouran Nakagawa (中川 凰蘭, Nakagawa Ouran)
Voiced by: Ano (Japanese); Britt McKillip (English)
A third-year high school student and later university student who is Kadode's best friend, she has oval-shaped eyebrows, is often seen drooling, and has long, black hair that she wears in pigtails with skull-shaped clips. Although Ouran is eccentric, friendly, and expressive in public, she tends to show her true self only to her friends and family. Ouran enjoys video games and dreams of bringing about the downfall of society and enslaving the human race. She values her friendship with Kadode above all else, calling their bond "absolute".

=== Supporting characters ===
Kiho Kurihara (栗原 キホ, Kurihara Kiho)
Voiced by: Atsumi Tanezaki (Japanese); Meaghan Hommy (English)
A fellow student at Kadode's and Ouran's high school who is also friends with Ai and Rin. She is short, sports a bob haircut, and has very thick eyebrows. As the most recent girl to join their friend group, she sometimes feels left out amongst the other girls. Her boyfriend is Kenichi Kohiruimaki. During the new year's holiday, she dies when an invader spacecraft is shot down over her apartment.
Ai Demoto (出元 亜衣, Demoto Ai)
Voiced by: Miyuri Shimabukuro (Japanese); Caitlyn Bairstow (English)
She was a friend of Kadode and Ouran in high school and university. She is of short, round stature and has small eyes and oversized glasses. Ai cares very little about the cold war between humans and the invaders, investing most of her time into caring for her five younger brothers. Her best friend is Rin.
Rin Hirama (平間 凛, Hirama Rin)
Voiced by: Saeko Ooki (Japanese); Kazumi Evans (English)
A tall, lean, and angular girl who is a friend of Kadode and Ouran at high school and in university. Although she is almost always silent, Rin is noted to be a major fan of boys' love manga.
Futaba Takemoto (竹本 ふたば, Takemoto Futaba)
Voiced by: Azumi Waki (Japanese); Chelsea Miller (English)
A young woman from Hakui, Ishikawa, moves to Tokyo and attends the same university as Kadode, Ouran, Makoto, Rin, and Ai. She has distinctive pink blush marks and an oval-shaped nose. During orientation, she bonds with Kadode over their shared love of Isobeyan and joins her friend group. Futaba came to Tokyo in order to become involved in the "peacesquid" movement, which advocates for the safety and rights of invaders.
Makoto Tainuma (田井沼 マコト, Tainuma Makoto)
Voiced by: Ryoko Shiraishi (Japanese); Travis Turner (English)
A student at Kadode and Ouran's university who moved from Hakui along with Futaba. Although Makoto is a boy, he loves dressing in women's clothing and wearing a blond wig. He wanted to be seen as an idol, so he moved to Tokyo in order to escape small-town gender norms and found an accepting group of friends in Futaba, Ouran, Kadode, Rin, Ai, and Oba.
Keita Ōba (大葉 圭太, Ōba Keita)
Voiced by: Miyu Irino (Japanese); Cole Howard (English)
A teen idol who disappeared on 8/31 and whose body was possessed by an invader. Oba befriends Kadode and Ouran, who quickly learn that he is an invader impersonating a human.
Kenichi Kohiruimaki (小比類巻 健一, Kohiruimaki Kenichi)
Voiced by: Koki Uchiyama (Japanese); Graham Hamilton (English)
Kiho's anxious and terminally online boyfriend. Kenichi is radicalized following the death of his girlfriend and forms a vigilante group intent on killing off the invaders.
Naoki Watarase (渡良瀬 直樹, Watarase Naoki)
Voiced by: Taito Ban (Japanese); Andrew Francis (English)
Kadode and Ouran's high school teacher, who has a stoic and pessimistic demeanor, after their graduation, Kadode pursues a brief romantic relationship with him.
Hiroshi Nakagawa (中川 ひろし, Nakagawa Hiroshi)
Voiced by: Junichi Suwabe (Japanese); Mike Li (English)
Ouran's older brother, who is obese but has idol-like features, is a Hikikomori who spends his days moderating internet forums.
Nobuo Koyama (小山 ノブオ, Koyama Nobuo)
Voiced by: Kenjiro Tsuda (Japanese); Giles Panton (English)
Kadode's father, a manga editor, disappeared on 8/31.
Isobeyan (イソベやん)
Voiced by: Tomokazu Sugita (Japanese); Ian Hanlin (English)
The titular character of the in-universe manga is Isobeyan. A parody of Doraemon, he is a humanoid mushroom who gives Debeko various gadgets in a misguided attempt to help her solve her problems.
Debeko (デベ子)
Voiced by: Tarako (Japanese); Elyse Maloway (English)
A parody of Nobita Nobi in the in-universe manga Isobeyan. She is a careless and unintelligent girl who uses Isobeyan's gadgets to solve her problems, which usually backfires.
Head of the Invaders
Voiced by: Naoto Takenaka
Ojiro-senpai (尾城先輩)
Voiced by: Chiharu Sawashiro (Japanese); Ian Hanlin (English)
Hikari Sumaru (須丸光, Sumaru Hikari)
Voiced by: Saori Ōnishi (Japanese); Kazumi Evans (English)
Takarada (宝田)
Voiced by: Kenichirou Matsuda (Japanese); Andrew Kavadas (English)
Tarō Miura (三浦太郎, Miura Tarō)
Voiced by: Kengo Kawanishi (Japanese); Bill Newton (English)
Ogino (荻野)
Voiced by: Masafumi Kobatake (Japanese); Hiro Kanagawa (English)

== Media ==
=== Manga ===
Dead Dead Demon's Dededede Destruction, written and illustrated by Inio Asano, was first announced with the tentative title Honobono Fūfu (ほのぼの夫婦; "Tender-hearted Couple"). The manga started in Shogakukan's seinen manga magazine, Big Comic Spirits, on April 28, 2014. The series went on hiatus multiple times. It finished on February 28, 2022. Shogakukan collected its chapters in twelve tankōbon volumes, released from September 30, 2014, to March 30, 2022.

Viz Media announced at the 2017 San Diego Comic-Con that it had licensed the manga in North America.

==== Volumes ====
No.	Original release date	Original ISBN	English release date	English ISBN
1	September 30, 2014	978-4-09-186500-7	April 17, 2018	978-1-4215-9935-9
2	February 27, 2015	978-4-09-186857-2	July 17, 2018	978-1-4215-9956-4
3	August 28, 2015	978-4-09-187260-9; 978-4-09-159212-5 (LE)	October 16, 2018	978-1-4215-9958-8
4	February 29, 2016	978-4-09-187563-1; 978-4-09-941867-0 (LE)	January 15, 2019	978-1-4215-9959-5
5	September 30, 2016; September 28, 2017 (LE)	978-4-09-187829-8; 978-4-09-941880-9 (LE)	April 16, 2019	978-1-4215-9960-1
6	May 30, 2017; May 26, 2017 (LE)	978-4-09-189567-7; 978-4-09-941890-8 (LE)	July 16, 2019	978-1-9747-0786-7
7	August 30, 2018	978-4-09-860100-4; 978-4-09-943025-2 (LE)	October 15, 2019	978-1-9747-0787-4
8	June 28, 2019	978-4-09-860354-1; 978-4-09-943052-8 (LE)	June 16, 2020	978-1-9747-1531-2
9	December 26, 2019	978-4-09-860520-0; 978-4-09-943058-0 (LE)	January 19, 2021	978-1-9747-1889-4
10	December 25, 2020	978-4-09-860834-8; 978-4-09-943077-1 (LE)	September 21, 2021	978-1-9747-2520-5
11	July 30, 2021	978-4-09-861157-7; 978-4-09-943089-4 (LE)	August 16, 2022	978-1-9747-3010-0
12	March 30, 2022	978-4-09-861293-2; 978-4-09-943102-0 (LE)	April 18, 2023	978-1-9747-3630-0

=== Anime ===
In March 2022, it was announced that the series would receive an anime adaptation produced by Production +h. It was later confirmed to be a two-part film adaptation directed by Tomoyuki Kurokawa, with a screenplay by Reiko Yoshida, character designs and chief animation direction by Nobutaka Ito, and music composed by Taro Umebayashi. The first part premiered in Japanese theaters on March 22, 2024. The second part was originally scheduled for April 19, but was later delayed to May 24 to improve the film's quality. The first part features the theme song "ZeZeZeZettai Seiiki" (絶絶絶絶対聖域; lit. 'Abababab Absolute Sanctuary'), performed by Ano feat. Lilas Ikuta, while the second part features the theme song "Seishun Ōka" (青春謳歌; lit. 'Adolescence Hymn'), performed by Lilas Ikuta feat. Ano.

An 18-episode original net animation (ONA) series edition of the films streamed worldwide on Crunchyroll from May 24 to September 20, 2024, featuring new footage not included in the theatrical release, written by Takaaki Suzuki. An English dub by Ocean Productions was released simultaneously with its streaming debut. The opening song is "Shinsekai Yori" (SHINSEKAIより; lit. 'From the New World'), performed by Ano and Lilas Ikuta (used as an ending song for episode 0), while the ending song is the film's first part theme song "ZeZeZeZettai Seiiki" for episodes 1–8, and the second part theme song "Seishun Ōka" for episodes 9–17. Gaga released the episodes in Japan on a limited Blu-ray Disc box set, which became available for purchase through its online store on December 4, 2024.

==== Episodes ====
No.	Directed by (Note: Information is taken from the ending credits of each episode.)	Written by	Storyboarded by	Original release date (Note: Information is taken from when Crunchyroll uploaded the episode on its website.)
0	Haruo Ōgawara; Kazumi Terada; Kenya Kodama	Takaaki Suzuki	Ikuo Yamakado; Takayuki Yamamoto; Onyoung Kaneshou	May 24, 2024
A massive ship unexpectedly emerges above Tokyo Bay, triggering a state of emergency. Amid the ensuing chaos, Nobuo Koyama, an employee at a publishing company, becomes entangled in the spaceship's crash.
1	Kazumi Terada	Reiko Yoshida	Nobutake Ito; Masatsugu Arakawa	May 31, 2024
Three years have passed since a giant ship appeared over Tokyo. Though its arrival seemed to signal the end of normal life and the world's collapse, the ship remained inactive, and life carried on as normal.
2	Akira Honma	Reiko Yoshida	Akira Honma; Tomoyuki Kurokawa	June 7, 2024
In Suginami, a smaller disc crashes into a residential neighborhood. To address the growing threat of these crashes, a private company rushes to deploy a new weapon system. Meanwhile, Kadode musters her courage and pays a visit to her teacher's home.
3	Atsuji Tanizawa; Ilya Kuvshinov	Takaaki Suzuki	Ilya Kuvshinov	June 14, 2024
Following the successful takedown of its first target by the Fujin-6, the government is urgently pushing for the rapid deployment of additional units by any means necessary. However, some voices are beginning to question this approach.
4	Onyoung Kaneshou	Reiko Yoshida	Shōtarō Kitamura	June 21, 2024
It's Christmas, and the girls are gathered to celebrate together. Meanwhile, the mother ship continues to release smaller vessels, which are being intercepted and shot down by the Fujin Model 7. However, not all of these takedowns and subsequent crashes go as planned.
5	Kazumi Terada	Reiko Yoshida	Kazumi Terada	June 28, 2024
Reflecting on their elementary school days, Oran and Kadode's friendship begins during a summer course when Oran reaches out to Kadode, who is frequently bullied by their classmates. However, Oran struggles to defend her new friend back at school. During this time, the pair also stumble upon a mysterious creature, adding an unusual twist to their bond.
6	Katakuri; Kazumi Terada	Reiko Yoshida	Akira Honma	July 5, 2024
Kadode takes it upon herself to use the "invader's" tools to assist those in need. One sweltering summer day, she attempts to help a pregnant woman stranded at a closed railway crossing but inadvertently causes a train derailment in the process. Horrified by the unintended consequences of her actions, Kadode is devastated that her efforts to do good resulted in harm. Determined to make amends, she vows never to fail again.
7	Atsuji Tanizawa	Takaaki Suzuki	Ilya Kuvshinov	July 12, 2024
Ai joins an admirer on a sightseeing bus tour through Tokyo. At the same time, the company SES pushes forward with the development of advanced weapons systems, aiming to make Japan self-reliant and eliminate its dependence on foreign nations.
8	Taku Kimura	Reiko Yoshida	Taku Kimura	July 19, 2024
Kadode and Oran graduate from high school, stepping into a new chapter of their lives. Meanwhile, Japan continues its intense efforts in constructing the Chokujin, while the existence of the invaders is kept a secret. However, a growing resistance begins to emerge.
9	Takayuki Yamamoto	Reiko Yoshida	Masatsugu Arakawa	July 26, 2024
Kadode, Oran, Ai, and Rin start their studies and encounter Futaba on campus. As protest movements gain momentum, the government struggles to conceal the existence of the invaders any longer, especially after a recent incident exposes the truth.
10	Kazumi Terada; Kenya Kodama	Reiko Yoshida	Yōjirō Arai; Kazumi Terada	August 2, 2024
Oran comes across the invader inhabiting Oba's body and chooses to temporarily shelter him with Kadode. At the same time, the JSDF and other organizations initiate a public search for the invaders following the revelation of their existence.
11	Atsuji Tanizawa	Takaaki Suzuki	Ilya Kuvshinov	August 9, 2024
As the Fujin Model 9 is introduced, the invaders' situation becomes more perilous. SHIP grows increasingly desperate as their efforts fail to garner attention and public interest fades. Meanwhile, the government upgrades the new Fujin models with AI technology.
12	Asahi Yoshimura	Reiko Yoshida	Taku Kimura	August 16, 2024
Aware that the world is on the brink of destruction, Kadode plans a meeting with her former teacher, Watarase. Meanwhile, Oba confronts an invader, seeking answers about the situation aboard the mothership. The Occultism Club also embarks on a summer camp trip.
13	Asahi Yoshimura	Reiko Yoshida	Takashi Iida	August 23, 2024
Futaba makes a choice about the mission given to her by SHIP. Meanwhile, Ontan sneaks away early in the morning, sparking concern in Oba, who fears the worst. Worried about what might happen, Oba teams up with Makoto to locate Oran before things take a turn for the worse.
14	Atsuji Tanizawa	Takaaki Suzuki	Kazumi Terada	August 30, 2024
As the mothership falls apart and crashes toward Tokyo, the government struggles to prevent foreign interference. In their final moments of desperation, the invaders see no choice but to resort to a drastic measure.
15	Xu Chuanfeng (Note: Credited as the Japanese reading, Jyo Denhou.)	Reiko Yoshida	Yoh Koike	September 6, 2024
As Kadode, Oran, and their friends debate whether to return to Tokyo, the situation in the city intensifies. The government accelerates the launch of their ark, "Ocean", and prepares to abandon the city. Meanwhile, Kohiruimaki is formulating his own plan.
16	Kazumi Terada	Reiko Yoshida	Kazumi Terada	September 13, 2024
As the world nears destruction, Kadode, Oran, and their friends return to Tokyo, while Oba races against time to use the password and shut down the mothership's reactor before it detonates.
17	Tomoyuki Kurokawa; Kazumi Terada; Kenya Kodama	Takaaki Suzuki	Masahiko Ohkura; Tomoki Kyoda	September 20, 2024
Returning to the world after August 32nd, Makoto encounters Kadode's father. Makoto realizes there is only one possible solution for Nobuo: he must reset the world again and return to the moment 12 years ago, the point where the Shift Machine is anchored.

== Reception ==
By March 2022, the manga had over 3 million copies in circulation.

Dead Dead Demon's Dededede Destruction, alongside PLINIVS, placed eighteenth on Takarajimasha's Kono Manga ga Sugoi! 2016 ranking of top 20 manga for male readers. It won the French award of "Daruma for Best Drawing Manga" at the Japan Expo Awards in 2017. The series was chosen as one of the best manga at the San Diego Comic-Con Best and Worst Manga Awards of 2018. The manga received the Attilio Micheluzzi Award in 2018 for Best Foreign Manga. The series won the French Konishi Prize for the Best Translated Manga in 2019. In 2021, along with Police in a Pod, Dead Dead Demon's Dededede Destruction won the 66th Shogakukan Manga Award in the general category. It was also awarded an Excellence Award in the Manga Division at the 25th Japan Media Arts Festival in 2022.

The manga was nominated for an Eisner Award in the category "Best U.S. Edition of International Material—Asia" in 2019.
