= Spy Kids: Mission Critical =

Animated adventure-comedy TV series

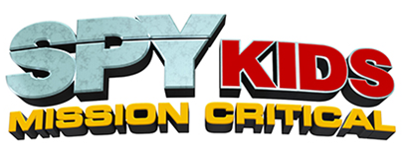
- Genre: Adventure; Comedy; Children
- Created by: Michael Hefferon; Sean Jara
- Based on: Spy Kids by Robert Rodriguez
- Developed by: F.M. De Marco
- Voices of: Ashley Bornancin; Carter Hastings; Travis Turner; Mira Sorvino; Candi Milo; Tom Kenny; Richard Ian Cox; Christian Lanz; Nesta Cooper
- Composer: Joel S. Silver
- Country of origin: United States
- Original language: English
- No. of seasons: 2
- No. of episodes: 20

Production
- Executive producers: F.M. De Marco; David L. Glasser; Michael Hefferon; Keith Levine; Robert Rodriguez; Matthew Signer; Bob Weinstein (4 episodes); Jill Sandford and Andy Yeatman (1 episode)
- Running time: 23 – 25 minutes
- Production company: Dimension Television

Original release
- Network: Netflix
- Release: April 20 – November 30, 2018

Spy Kids: Mission Critical is an American CGI-animated adventure-comedy children's television series based on the Spy Kids franchise by Robert Rodriguez (Note: The writer, F.M. DeMarco, wrote in a deleted tweet that the show has no continuity with the previous films before it, having its own style and attitude. Tweet link.) and produced by Dimension Television and animated by Mainframe Studios. It was released in two seasons of 10 episodes each on April 20 and November 30, 2018 on Netflix in the United States.

== Plot ==
In Mission Critical, brother-and-sister team Juni and Carmen Cortez attend Spy Kids Academy, a top-secret spy school for kid agents. When a new counter-spy agency threatens the safety of the world, it will be up to junior spies Juni and Carmen to train and lead a team of fellow Spy Kids cadets against the forces of S.W.A.M.P. (Sinister Wrongdoers Against Mankind's Preservation) and their diabolical leader, Golden Brain. The Mission Critical team may not be ready, but they are the only ones to call when grown-up spies can't do the job.

== Voice cast and characters ==
- Ashley Bornancin as Carmen Cortez / Tango, and Barracuda
- Carter Hastings as Juni Cortez / Aztec
- Caitlyn Bairstow as Glitch and Gablet
- Nicholas Coombe as Ace
- Nesta Cooper as Claudia Floop / Scorpion
- Richard Ian Cox as Sir Awesome
- Tom Kenny as Golden Brain, Spurious Visage, Professor Küpkakke, and Dave-Bot
- Travis Turner as Peter St. Ignatius / PSI / Agent No-One
- Christian Lanz as Gregorio Cortez, Fegan Floop, DJ Otto Tune / Death Meddle
- Candi Milo as Vida Immortata, Malware, Mauly the Sparkle Scout, Kopi Vasquez and Glendora Chatting-Botham
- Mira Sorvino as Ingrid Avellan-Cortez
- Yuri Lowenthal as Desmond "Dez" and Zedmond "Zed" Vasquez / Rock n' Roll, Jaime Vasquez, Talon and Jason Pietranthony / Improv / Improvisario
- Molly Shannon as Murna
- Kate Micucci as Therese
- Patton Oswalt as Bradley Feinstein / Mint Condition
- Bobcat Goldthwait as JT / The Worm
- Thomas Lennon as Dr. Chad Jericho
- Terrence Stone as the deeply-distorted voice of Agent No-One (season 1)
- Robert Englund as Agent No-One's disguised voice (season 2, episode 8)

== Production ==
The production was announced as a production by The Weinstein Company and Netflix and was scheduled for release in 2018. The two seasons each consist of 10 episodes and were co-produced by Mainframe Studios as part of a deal between its parent company, Wow Unlimited Media, TWC and Netflix.

Mike Fleming, Jr. of Deadline Hollywood announced the composition, look and style of the series whose creators were revealed as Michael Hefferon, president of Rainmaker Studios (which would be consolidated under Mainframe Studios itself in 2020) and Sean Jara, who created the Nickelodeon series Mysticons the year prior. The villains in the show were described to be as "colorful" as the protagonists. The series was said to contain "as much comedy as wish fulfillment". FM DeMarco is the head writer of the series. John Tellegen was one of the show's writers. Robert Rodriguez and Bob Weinstein served executive producers due to the firing of the latter's brother Harvey, thus making it the first Weinstein Company title not to have Harvey's involvement.

Ashley Bornancin, Carter Hastings, Travis Turner, Mira Sorvino, Tom Kenny and Christian Lanz were announced as voice cast for Carmen, Juni, PSI, Ingrid, Golden Brain and Gregorio respectively. FM De Marco said that he had "many inspirations for the series but it has its own very specific style and attitude". He also said that the show has a nice mix of all kinds of humor, and contains old and new characters. Travis Turner faced controversy for being cast as the voice of PSI, a black character, since Travis himself is white. Just before the 18 April launch, the Weinstein Company was removed and replaced with Dimension Television, the television label of Dimension Films, which handled production in-series, as the distributor. Bob Weinstein's name was also removed from the show's credits in all but 4 episodes.

== Episodes ==
=== Series overview ===
Season	Episodes	Originally released
1	10	April 20, 2018
2	10	November 30, 2018

=== Season 1 (2018) ===
No. overall	No. in season	Title	Directed by	Written by	Original release date
1	1	"Mission Critical"	Ian Freedman	FM De Marco	April 20, 2018
After a counter-spy organization codenamed S.W.A.M.P. completely overruns and outmatches the OSS, Gregorio Cortez sends all of his agents into deep cover when he learns that a gold version of the "Third Brain" has escaped and desires revenge. To combat this new threat, Gregorio and his wife Ingrid assign their children, the level-headed Carmen and reckless Juni to recruit and lead a team of teen Spy Cadets, the weapons master "Ace", the hyped-up hacker "Glitch", clumsy but very neat "Sir Awesome" and martial arts expert "Scorpion" to keep Golden Brain in check in their most difficult challenge ever; Codename: Mission Critical.
2	2	"School Dazed"	Ian Freedman	FM De Marco	April 20, 2018
Life in Spy Academy couldn't be better for Mission Critical... or could it? Thanks to Ace's snoring, co-leader Juni hasn't been able to get a wink of sleep. But Carmen has her own problems, because about this time of year, she usually has a slumber party with her middle school friends and has become quite distracted with all the calls and texts. To make matters worse, Juni finds himself needing to pass an impassible Gadget Gauntlet just to stay in class. Can Mission Critical's leaders find the focus and determination they need to stay in school or will all of these distractions get them expelled?
3	3	"Songs in the Key of Pain"	Mike Alcock & Ian Freedman	Mark Hoffmeier	April 20, 2018
Carmen suddenly becomes so focused on trying to figure out exactly what the serum that they recovered from their first mission is, and how it's connected to Golden Brain, that she pushes a hyped-up Glitch away, especially since Glitch wants to spend some time with her. Things only get worse when Golden Brain hires DJ Otto Tune to capture the Spy Kids and Glitch falls right into his trap thanks to listening to a new hypnotic song that only teens can hear. Carmen will have to use her own sick beats to silence Otto's Hypnotic song before Glitch becomes his slave forever.
4	4	"Desert-ed"	Craig George & Ian Freedman	Sam Cherington	April 20, 2018
Thanks to a heated competition over every little thing, Ace and Juni have been determined to prove that they're the best. But when that competition strands them in the desert with no transport and minimal supplies, Juni and Ace must put their differences aside and work together to save the rest of Mission Critical from a trap set by S.W.A.M.P.
5	5	"Frenemies for Life"	Mike Alcock & Ian Freedman	FM De Marco	April 20, 2018
During the annual Spy Games, Mission Critical runs afoul of The B-Team, a team of Spy Kids who claim that they can do a better job of keeping Golden Brain in check. To settle this debate, Carmen recklessly bet Mission Critical responsibilities as the prize for winning the games.
6	6	"And Scene!"	Craig George & Ian Freedman	Ricky Roxburgh	April 20, 2018
When the master of deception teacher, Spurious Visage, suddenly becomes distracted, forgetful and depressed, a curious Carmen decides to do a little investigation into this unusual behavior as a favor for him helping them in the Spy Games. The case eventually leads her into organizing an unsanctioned mission into a S.W.A.M.P. Training Facility to retrieve and reform former OSS cadet turned traitor known as Agent Improv who used to be Spurious' best student before the OSS sent him unprepared into the field.
7	7	"Inner-Childlike Behavior"	Mike Alcock & Ian Freedman	John Tellegen	April 20, 2018
When cadet Scorpion returns to the Academy and finds that Mission Critical has been acting like a bunch of kids since her departure, she cracks down on them hard to get them back to being the super spies they're meant to be. But when her father, Fegan Floop, comes to the Academy to become their new master of media manipulation teacher, she starts acting like a kid herself. Things only get worse for her when Floop reveals her deepest, darkest secret to Carmen, who mocks her. Realizing that she no longer has a place at the Academy, Scorpion decides to leave. Can Carmen reconcile with her and convince her to stay or will Mission Critical lose her forever?
8	8	"The Vinyl Countdown"	Mike Alcock & Ian Freedman	Justin Halliwell	April 20, 2018
When famous artist Mint Condition comes to town, PSI heads off to see him, which makes Juni somewhat jealous, especially since they have been best friends forever. But it eventually turns out that Juni's suspicions were correct when PSI leaves the academy to go work for him, but finds out that Mint Condition is working for Golden Brain and plans to turn all of Mission Critical into the latest centerpiece for his art. Juni also learns the importance of being there to support your friends when they need you the most.
9	9	"Off the Grid"	Craig George & Ian Freedman	John Tellegen	April 20, 2018
When Professor Küpkakke gives them an impossible exam to take, known as the Küpkakke Mindbender, Carmen and Juni search the academy for a quiet place to study. Matters only get worse when the rest of Mission Critical has to give Professor Küpkakke the run-around and the B-Team returns to make things harder. When Headmaster Immortata learns that they have gone AWOL, she puts the Academy on emergency lockdown, which traps Carmen, Juni and their parents in an old safe room with no air. Can they find a way out before they suffocate or is this the end of the Cortez family?
10	10	"The Cookie Crumbles"	Craig George & Ian Freedman	FM De Marco	April 20, 2018
When Mission Critical locates S.W.A.M.P. Headquarters, they proceed to take out Golden Brain's satellite network. Things get complicated when Sir Awesome's "spy sense" keeps interfering with their mission and a young cookie scout girl named Mauly shows up. With the team doubting Sir Awesome's abilities, Mauly, who is really Golden Brain's Head of Security, sees a chance to take out the Spy Kids, but Sir Awesome's spy sense saves them and keeps S.W.A.M.P.'s forces at bay long enough to defeat Golden Brain. The team also learns about the true nature of the Serum that they found and Golden Brain acquires a mole in the Spy Academy.

=== Season 2 (2018) ===
No. overall	No. in season	Title	Directed by	Written by	Original release date
11	1	"Secrets & Spies"	Mike Alcock	FM De Marco	November 30, 2018
After a string of successful missions in shutting down S.W.A.M.P. outposts, Mission Critical begins Second Semester at the Academy with Glitch's new A.I. Assistant, Gablet, and a new Etiquette Class. Things get rather Dark for our heroes when Golden Brain turns his IT guy, JT, into a Computer Virus known as "The Worm" and has his Mole uploads it into the Academy Mainframe. Without Power or Lights in the Academy, and with Gablet offline, Glitch has rely on the knowledge of The Old Spy Academy and her Self-Confidence to flush the Worm out of the Academy's System before the reprogrammed training bots hurt her friends.
12	2	"Heavy Meddle"	Mike Alcock	John Tellegen	November 30, 2018
Golden Brain is back in Business and decides to become a thief in order to expand his operation, which is why he brings in a re-branded Otto Tune as "Death Meddle" who uses the power of his new Sonic Scream to do some damage. But this is nothing compared to what Aztec has to do in order to help Ace get over all of his fears. Using Hypnosis, Juni somehow cures Ace of all his Fears, but gets them himself and has to fight through them to rescue a reckless Ace from taking out a S.W.A.M.P. Training facility on his own.
13	3	"Thumb Kind of Wonderful"	Craig George	Madison Bateman	November 30, 2018
After making a mistake that nearly cost them some important data to halt Golden Brains' operation, a Superstitious Carmen believes that she has been jinxed. To break the curse, she decides to try and make Tom Thumb-Thumb perfect, but soon realizes the importance of not dwelling on the mistakes of the past and accepting it. Golden Brain advances a step to completing his plans.
14	4	"Ace Off"	Mike Alcock	Justin Halliwell	November 30, 2018
After becoming the New face of the Cover of Espionage and Intrigue Magazine, Ace suddenly becomes insecure that he won't hold his title for next year. After receiving signs about a Miracle worker in Plastic Surgery named Dr. Chad Jericho, Ace seeks him out for some slight changes to his face, but is captured by the good doctor so that Golden Brain can get a New Face for his New Body. After being rescued by the rest of Mission Critical, the team realizes that Golden Brain has a mole in the Spy Academy and that he's been trying to get a hold of the Pinnoquinox Serum.
15	5	"Stakeout Burrito"	Craig George	Sam Cherington	November 30, 2018
After realizing that there is a mole among them in Spy Academy, the Mission Critical team's members begin accusing each other, leading to Juni and Carmen to stage two plans on unmasking the culprit: Carmen and one other will do a stakeout at the Taco Butte by posing as employees, but ends up stuck with Scorpion, who is getting on Carmen's nerves, and is Carmen's one suspect; Juni and the others try to use the Pinnoquinox serum as bait, but discover Juni never threw it into the vents, and that the mole is bouncing and masking their true signals. To make things worse, one of Carmen's school friends, Lola, shows up out of the blue and nearly exposes Carmen until Scorpion saves Carmen from being ousted as a spy. In the end, Glitch intercepts part of a transmission and the kids learn the name of the mole: Agent N-One.
16	6	"Pale Blue-Eyed Rider"	Craig George	Mitchell Golden	November 30, 2018
When Carmen spots Improv secretly following and helping Mission Critical on their latest missions to take out Golden Brain's satellite network to cut off communications with Agent No-One, Carmen learns he's the rogue agent who's been sabotaging SWAMP in the last couple of episodes, and thinks he might be trying to talk to her. Then again, considering he's her biggest crush, Juni gradually becomes the mature one when Carmen inadvertently leads her half of Mission Critical into a trap. In the end, they discover Agent Improv captured by Golden Brain in a nearby mine and that he's learned Agent No-One's true identity. But after escaping the mine, a zap from Golden Brain's cane injures Improv and erases his entire memory, much to Carmen's horror and sadness.
17	7	"Home Sick"	Mike Alcock	FM De Marco	November 30, 2018
When Juni is sent on his first solo mission by Gregorio Cortez, he ends up finding more than what he expected and barely survives a treacherous game put upon him by Agent No-One at the old OSS headquarters. Meanwhile, Carmen and the others try to covertly investigate the academy's staff to see if Agent No-One is one of them, in addition to wondering how Headmistress Vida Immortata has managed to stay so young all these years. In the end, Juni learns that Sebastian Oliver, the OSS Shadow Agent who created the Pinoquinox is an alias of his and Carmen's dad Gregorio.
18	8	"Flip-Flooped"	Mike Alcock	Will Morey	November 30, 2018
When the team's latest plan to unmask Agent No-One leads to them seeing Fegan Floop sneak into their quarters during a fake assembly staged by Sir Awesome, 4/6 of Mission Critical suspect him of being the traitor, especially after finding bugs in all his Floop brand merchandise and Scorpion's stuffed elephant "Ellie." However, while Juni grows unsure of Floop's status over the hours he and Scorpion have until morning to prove his innocence, Scorpion believes her father and plans on helping him clear his name.
19	9	"Family Unfriendly (part 1 of 2)"	Craig George	John Tellegen	November 30, 2018
After reluctantly showing PSI the secret library where the team's hiding the Pinnoquinox serum, Juni is shocked to learn that Gregorio and Ingrid Cortez have come back to join him and Carmen in the Battle of the Best Spy Family competition, along rivals Dez and Zed Vasquez and their parents, and Claudia 'Scorpion' Floop and her dad. However, after Carmen forces Juni to tell her what he's learned following his unusual behavior towards their dad, she tries to talk to Gregorio about the serum, leading Juni to inadvertently sabotage the Cortezes' chance of winning, allowing the Floops to win. Meanwhile, Glitch, Ace and Sir Awesome try and successfully intercept agent No-One's latest communique. After recording it and having Juni use his vocal manipulation skill to impersonate the disguised voice, Glitch finds a match and to everyone's surprise... PSI is Agent No-One's real voice, and the serum has been stolen.
20	10	"Moled Over (part 2 of 2)"	Craig George	FM De Marco	November 30, 2018
It is revealed that 6 months ago, PSI was blackmailed into becoming Agent No-One by Golden Brain in exchange for the last known whereabouts of his birth parents, who were lost on a mission for the OSS. In the present, Mission Critical and the Cortezes plan an all-out assault on SWAMP HQ before Golden Brain uses the Pinnoquinox serum to enhance his cybernetic body. However, PSI returns to help after regretting his recent actions and fakes his second betrayal to place an Anti-serum made from a rare mushroom's juice to sabotage Golden Brain's plan. In the end, Golden Brain's put into stasis, and PSI becomes the 7th official member of Mission Critical.
