= Ian Hanlin =

Canadian voice actor

- Born: Ian Stuart Hanlin; Cole Harbour, Nova Scotia, Canada
- Occupation: Voice actor
- Years active: 2010–present
- Partner: Caitlyn Bairstow (2017–present)

Ian Stuart Hanlin is a Canadian voice actor based in Vancouver.

Originally from Cole Harbour, Nova Scotia, he is known for his voice roles of Sunburst in My Little Pony: Friendship Is Magic, Lance Richmond in Nexo Knights, Acronix in Ninjago: Masters of Spinjitzu and Ralph in Fruit Ninja: Frenzy Force.

== Personal life ==
Hanlin has been dating Caitlyn Bairstow since 2017. They first met while recording Nexo Knights. They live together and own a dog named Nester.

== Filmography ==
=== Animation ===
List of voice performances in animation
Year	Title	Role
2010	The Little Prince	Prince Huang, Zaac
2011	GeoFreakZ	Monster Ken
2011–2016	Superbook	Prodigal Son, Angel, Naaman's Aide
2015–2017	Nexo Knights	Lance Richmond, Maynard, Jurgen von Stroheim, Edvard Evanson, Jack Shields, Shia LaBlade
2015–2019	My Little Pony: Friendship Is Magic	Sunburst, All Aboard, additional voices
2015–2024	Ninjago	Acronix, Chope, Cinder, Dan Vaapit, Imperium Guard #1, Mr. Pale (Dragons Rising Season 2(2024), Policeman, Prentis, Scroll Worm, Successful Samurai, Suetonius
2016	Littlest Pet Shop	Panda #4
2016	Supernoobs	Pete
2016	Geronimo Stilton	Julius Nosh
2016–2017	Beat Bugs	Dr. Roberts, Julia's Dad, Bug Factor Host, Bug Factor Host, Julia's Dad, Carwash Guy
2017	Tarzan and Jane	Police Officer, Goon #2, Guard #2
2017	Chuck's Choice	Abraham Stinkin, Misha's Dad, Gary
2017	Fruit Ninja: Frenzy Force	Ralph
2017–2018	Beyblade Burst	Trad Vasquez
2017–2018	Littlest Pet Shop: A World of Our Own	Mitchell Snailford, Samson Rotterton, Construction Bunny, Scrapper #3, Wilhelm, Construction Rabbit
2018	Minecraft Mini Series: Mystery of the Greek Isles	Poseidon, Theseus, Chimera
2018	Line Rangers	Paimon, Treasure Expert
2018	Mega Man: Fully Charged	Fire Man, Air Man, Man Man, Captain Dare, Volt Aire
2018	Lego Jurassic World: The Secret Exhibit	Owen Grady
2018–2022	Polly Pocket	Dad Pocket, Peanut, additional voices
2019	Tobot Athlon	Athlon Alpha
2019	Lego Jurassic World: Legend of Isla Nublar	Owen Grady, additional voices
2019	My Little Pony: Rainbow Roadtrip	Mayor Sunny Skies
2019	Tobot: Galaxy Detectives	Commander Universe, Invincible, Gregory, Ragonar, Melon Monster
2019–2023	Mr. Magoo	Mr. Magoo
2020	Marvel Battleworld: Mystery of the Thanostones	Throg, Thor
2020	Zoids Wild	Ikazuchi, Zamaas, Old School, Bronson, Ryder
2020	Dorg Van Dango	Smarmin Smarts
2020	My Little Pony: Pony Life	Snips
2020	Lego Marvel Avengers: Climate Conundrum	Thor, AIM Agent
2021	Marvel Battleworld: Treachery at Twilight	Throg
2021	Johnny Test	Various voices
2021	LEGO Marvel Avengers: Loki in Training	Thor
2021	Future Boy Conan	Kuzo
2022	LEGO Marvel Avengers: Time Twisted	Thor, Ant-Man
2022	Angry Birds: Summer Madness	Red, Neiderflyer
2022	Lego Friends Heartlake Stories: Fitting In	Joshua, Mr. Gibbons
2022	The Guava Juice Show	Hart Spirit
2022	Strawberry Shortcake: Berry in the Big City	Purple Pieman
2022	World Trigger	Koji Oki
2022–2024	Sonic Prime	Shadow the Hedgehog, Big the Cat, additional voices
2023	Dragon Quest: The Adventure of Dai	Killvern, Zamza, KillVearn, Piroro, Horkins
2023	Glitzy Dolls Go Dating	Brent Boomer, Willard Von Arschloch, Lawrence Sindinero
2023	The Dragon Prince	Shanty Singer
2023–2024	Kaeloo	Bad Kaeloo, English dub
2024	Dead Dead Demons Dededede Destruction	Isobeyan, Ojiro
2026	Lego DreamZzz: How to Fast Your Furious Dragons	Hiccup Horrendous Haddock III

=== Film ===
List of voice performances in film
Year	Title	Role	Notes
2016	Barbie: Spy Squad	Lazlo	Direct-to-video
2016	Sausage Party	Beet	Theatrical release
2016	LEGO Nexo Knights 4D: The Book of Creativity	Lance Richmond	4D Lego Land Film
2018	Valley of the Lanterns	Keelan	Limited Release
2018	Henchmen	Slap Happy, Bleep	Theatrical release
2020	Cats & Dogs 3: Paws Unite	Buck the K9 Shephard	Direct-to-video
2025	Light of the World	Jesus	Theatrical release

=== Video games ===
List of voice performances in video games
Year	Game	Role
2010	Tom Clancy's Ghost Recon	Additional Voices
2011	Trinity: Souls of Zill O'll	Areus
2013	Dead Rising 3	Brad Park
2016	Dead Rising 4	Survivors - Male
2018	Far Cry 5	Larry Parker
2018	Dragalia Lost	Alberius, Gozu Tenno, Doman
2019	Cadence of Hyrule	Octavo
2023	Industries of Titan	Sciarro Hess
2024	The Thaumaturge	Tsar Nikolai II Romanow
2025	Rift of the Necrodancer	Heph

=== Live-action ===
List of acting performances in film and television
Year	Title	Role	Notes
2013	Afflicted	Jeff	Limited release
2016	Legends of Tomorrow	Survivor	Episode: "Abominations"
2021	Time Helment	Boyfriend	

== Awards and nominations ==
- Leo Awards - Best Performance in an Animation Program (2021) – Winner
- UBCP/ACTRA Awards - Best Voice (2022) – Winner
- SOVAS Awards - Outstanding Animation Character - Film or TV - Best Voiceover (2022) – Nominee
- UBCP/ACTRA Awards - Best Voice (2023) – Winner
- Leo Awards - Best Voice Performance Animation Series (2024) - Nominee
