= Super Lucky's Tale =

2017 video game

- Developer: Playful Studios
- Publisher: Microsoft Studios
- Engine: Unity
- Platforms: Windows; Xbox One
- Release: November 7, 2017
- Genres: Platform, action-adventure
- Mode: Single-player

Super Lucky's Tale is a 2017 platform game developed by Playful Studios and published by Microsoft Studios for Windows and Xbox One. It is the sequel to Lucky's Tale, a virtual reality 3D platformer for the Oculus Rift. The game was released as a launch title for the Xbox One X on November 7, 2017. The game received an overall mixed reception from critics. It is followed by an expanded version of the game titled New Super Lucky's Tale, which saw releases for various platforms between 2019 and 2020.

== Gameplay ==
Super Lucky's Tale's gameplay has been described as reminiscent of 90's-era 3D platformers such as Banjo-Kazooie, Crash Bandicoot and Super Mario 64. Each of the game's five worlds is presented with its own hub, where each individual level can be accessed. The hubs are levels themselves, with coins to collect and some basic platforming required to reach new areas. Each hub has around five main levels, and a number of additional puzzles to complete. The goal of each of these levels is to collect clovers, which enable Lucky to take back control of the Book of Ages from Jinx. Each level has four clovers to find — one for completing the level, one for collecting 300 coins, one for finding the five letters that spell "LUCKY", and one "secret" clover, which is usually in a hidden area of the level or earned by completing a short timed challenge.

The levels themselves offer a variety of platforming challenges. Some are 3D arenas with non-linear progression. Others feature 2D side-scrolling. There are also several mini-levels in each world, including Sokoban-style puzzles and mazes where Lucky is trapped in a marble and has to be guided to an exit. Finally, there are several boss fights featuring the Kitty Litter and Jinx.

== Plot ==
Super Lucky's Tale follows Lucky Swiftail, a curious and brave fox on a quest to find his inner strength and help his sister Lyra protect the Book of Ages, inside of which exist entire worlds and characters. The game's antagonist is a cat named Jinx, a mysterious villain who is trying to steal the Book of Ages for his own nefarious purposes. Along the way, Lucky encounters a supporting cast of friends and adversaries. Lucky must confront the Kitty Litter, Jinx's mischievous children. Lucky also meets friends and allies along the way, including misplaced Yetis, Kookie Spookies, a village of farming worms, and other colorful characters, all of whom live inside the Book of Ages and who, without Lucky's help, will fall prey to Jinx and the Kitty Litter's evil machinations.

== Development and release ==
Super Lucky's Tale was developed as a sequel to Lucky's Tale, an exclusive VR title for the Oculus Rift, and published by Microsoft Studios. The game was one of the first Xbox One games to feature Dolby Atmos support.

Paul Bettner, CEO of Playful Studios, described the game's genre as a 'playground platformer'. "My favorite way to look at this genre is it's a place where we get to do anything. You can play a traditional level, and if the next level is a crazy mini game where you're flying through the air or you're riding on a giant mech, that's ok. This genre of platforming gets to draw from lots of different genres and mix them together" he explained.

Super Lucky's Tale was supported by downloadable content released in 2018. The first post-game expansion is Gilly Island, where Lucky is sucked into the Book of Ages, this time emerging in a tropical paradise. Lucky learns that Lady Meowmalade, a member of the Kitty Litter who is at large after Jinx's defeat, is celebrating the release of her latest single and hijacked the island, which he must now help liberate. Gilly Island is followed by Guardian Trials, which Lucky's sister Lyra sets up to train Lucky and have him formally inducted as a full-fledged Guardian upon his completion of the trials. The Guardian Trials involve a series of challenging levels which is higher in difficulty compared to most levels from the base game.

New Super Lucky's Tale, an expanded version of the game, was later released for Nintendo Switch on November 8, 2019, and for PlayStation 4, Windows, and Xbox One on August 21, 2020. Described as a partial remake by its developers and reviewers, it features several changes, refinements and integrates both downloadable expansions into the main game.

== Reception ==
Reception

Aggregate score
Aggregator	Score
Metacritic	(PC) 59/100 (XONE) 64/100

Review scores
Publication	Score
Destructoid	7/10
Electronic Gaming Monthly	1/5
GameRevolution	8/10
GameSpot	6/10
Hardcore Gamer	4/5
IGN	5/10

Super Lucky's Tale received "mixed or average" reviews, according to review aggregator website Metacritic.

Ryan McCaffrey from IGN gave a mediocre rating, and said that "poor controls and a lousy camera doom the otherwise adorable-critter platformer". McCaffrey found it particularly disappointing as he very much wanted to like the character and the concept of the game as the Xbox brand "could use a decent answer to Nintendo in the 3D platformer genre". Kallie Plagge from GameSpot found the game to be somewhat generic, noting its limited camera controls to be frustrating and added: "It's easy to imagine how Super Lucky's Tale would be the highlight of a younger kid's weekend, but it has little to offer anyone looking for an enjoyably challenging 3D platformer".

Cody Perez from GameRevolution rated the game positively and considered Super Lucky's Tale to be another example of the 3D platformer genre's "renaissance of sorts" in the year 2017. To him, the game's strengths include its colorful and varied worlds, Lucky's signature burrow ability, the voluminous amount of collectibles to search for, and a nice mix between 2D and 3D levels, while its weaknesses include an overly short main story and "bizarre camera design".

Jeremy Peeples from Hardcore Gamer praised the game's graphics and the fast pace of its action. He summarized it as a "fine 3D platformer" which "blends in more types of platforming than most entries in the genre and keeps the collect-a-thon to a minimum", and controls well outside of some camera issues. For Peeples, the game's biggest flaw is its inability to leave a deeper impression, even though most elements were handled reasonably well.

Chris Carter from Destructoid gave the game a 7 out of 10 calling it "a clean, responsive platformer" and noted its controls are "an achievement given how sloppy some mechanics are in recent mascot platformers". Nevertheless, Carter's criticisms about the game included an underwhelming "reward loop", and a lack of quality of life features as he struggled to keep himself informed with his progress for collectible items that he may have missed out on.

Ray Carsillo from Electronic Gaming Monthly gave a negative review and called it "subpar". He summarized that ultimately, Super Lucky's Tale is "unrealized potential" when it could have served as a solid entry point for a new franchise. For Carsillo, Lucky's cute and colorful world is held back by the game's "poor controls, a terrible camera, and just overall lackluster gameplay".
