= New Super Lucky's Tale =

2019 3D platform video game

- Developer: Playful Studios
- Publisher: Playful Studios
- Composers: Aaron Brown; Romain Gauthier
- Engine: Unity
- Platforms: Nintendo Switch; PlayStation 4; Windows; Xbox One; PlayStation 5
- Release: Nintendo Switch; November 8, 2019; PS4, Windows, Xbox One; August 21, 2020; PS5; March 26, 2026
- Genres: Platform, action-adventure
- Mode: Single-player

New Super Lucky's Tale is a 2019 platform game developed and published by Playful Studios. It is an enhanced remake of 2017's Super Lucky's Tale, also developed by Playful Studios and published by Microsoft Studios. Initially released for Nintendo Switch in November 2019, it was later released for PlayStation 4, Windows, and Xbox One, in August 2020. The game received generally positive reviews, with critics praising its improvements over the original.

== Gameplay ==
New Super Lucky's Tale is a platform game in which players control Lucky as he travels across many different worlds contained within an artifact known as the Book of Ages. Each world is presented with its own hub which could be explored and traversed within a 3D space in a non-linear manner. Each world feature levels where Lucky clears various objectives and searches for secrets in order to collect pages which contain a clover emblem, which grant access to a boss fight involving a member of the game's villainous faction, the Kitty Litter, and allow players to progress to the next world at its conclusion. Certain levels place Lucky in a 2D side-scrolling environment, and occasionally these levels have Lucky moving in one constant direction, with a focus on quick reflexes through dodging obstacles which appear on screen through jumping or burrowing. Other levels feature sliding puzzles, and marble puzzles where Lucky is shrunk down and contained in a marble ball; the player must tilt the stage and successfully navigate Lucky in order to progress. Lucky may dispatch enemies by swiping them with his tail or jump on them. Players may dress Lucky in a variety of outfits purchased using coins collected in each level.

=== New features ===
New Super Lucky's Tale features a reworked story, along with an expanded cast of characters for players to interact with; a fully rotatable camera which can be zoomed in or out by pushing up and down on the right analog stick; and levels designed around the implementation of tighter controls. The running order of the worlds that players encounter throughout the course of the narrative have been changed with the integration of Gilly's Island downloadable content (DLC) as one of the game's five core worlds. Some hub worlds have been updated and renamed, while the aesthetics and contents of several levels have been altered, or redesigned in its entirety. Foxington, a world containing challenge stages that was part of the Guardian Trials DLC in Super Lucky's Tale, is also included and unlocked after completing the main game.

== Plot ==
The plot outline of New Super Lucky's Tale is loosely based on the original Super Lucky's Tale, where Lucky Swiftail embarks on a quest to help his sister Lyra, a member of the Guardian Order, to protect the Book of Ages, inside of which exist entire worlds and characters. New Super Lucky's Tale includes additional backstory about other members of Lucky's family, which include his parents and brother, who all belong to the Guardian Order.

The sorcerer Jinx is a Guardian and close friend of Lucky's father Liam. When his world inexplicably vanishes, leaving him and his children the Kitty Litter as its lone survivors, he betrays and banishes the other Guardians to unknown worlds in a bid to claim the Book of Ages for himself. The few remaining guardians, including Lyra and Lucky, flee with the Book and avoid the Kitty Litter for years until they are finally cornered in Lucky's home world of Foxington. The Book of Ages reacts to Jinx's magic by scattering its pages and pulling the Kitty Litter and Lucky into itself.

With assistance and guidance offered by the friends he meets inside the Book, Lucky collects the missing pages to reopen the portals to the other worlds. Along the way, he faces off against members of the Kitty Litter, including Master Mittens, a strategic cat capable of teleportation; Tess the Tinker, a hyper intelligent but frantic scientist; General Buttons, an abnormally small and battle-minded cat; Lt. Fluffinstuff, Buttons' unintelligent but physically imposing sidekick; and Lady Meowmalade, a toxic social media influencer.

When Lucky reaches Jinx's Castle, Lyra appears and asks him to give her the Book of Ages, but this is revealed to be an illusion by Jinx. He steals the Book and explains that he allowed Lucky to gather the pages on his behalf, intending to use it to rewrite history. Lucky battles and defeats Jinx, who is imprisoned along with his children, and reunites with Lyra and the Guardians in Foxington. In the post-game content, Lucky undertakes the trials to become a Guardian, and is formally inducted into the order. Elsewhere, Mittens is revealed to have evaded capture and frees his family with assistance from Lucas, the missing brother of Lucky and Lyra.

== Development and release ==
New Super Lucky's Tale is a remake of the original Super Lucky's Tale. Playful Studios said Super Lucky's Tale was "rebuilt from the ground up", with improvements introduced to most aspects of the original game. Playful Studios maintained that as a result, New Super Lucky's Tale is "essentially a new game" as opposed to a remaster. Previous DLC released for Super Lucky's Tale is fully incorporated into the narrative of New Super Lucky's Tale.

In the original Super Lucky's Tale, Lucky runs on all fours. The developers changed Lucky's running animation for New Super Lucky's Tale, and explained that while they appreciated the original aesthetic, Lucky's movement as a bipedal character was found to be more precise and pleasant to handle due to the reworked game controls.

The game's creative director Dan Hurd said the developers are open to the idea of a sequel and expressed an interest in implementing unused ideas should such a project be pursued: for example, there were early prototypes where Lucky had a companion character. Hurd indicated that a potential sequel should offer experiences which are fundamentally new, instead of more of the same.

== Reception ==
Reception

Aggregate scores
Aggregator	Score
Metacritic	NS: 76/100; PS4: 76/100; XONE: 80/100
OpenCritic	79% recommend

Review scores
Publication	Score
Nintendo Life	8/10
Nintendo World Report	8/10
PlayStation Official Magazine – UK	7/10
Push Square	7/10
Screen Rant	7/10

New Super Lucky's Tale received "generally favorable" reviews on all console platforms, according to review aggregator Metacritic. Fellow review aggregator OpenCritic assessed that the game received strong approval, being recommended by 79% of critics.

In his review for Nintendo World Report, John Rairdin considered the Nintendo Switch to be a more appropriate platform for a game he considered to be "Xbox One's strangest exclusive". For Rairdin, the existing content had been improved upon and felt new. He listed the game's presentation, 3D platforming, and additional story content as its strengths, while its few weaknesses include control schemes for the 2D stages and mild performance issues.

Chris Scullion from Nintendo Life summarized that New Super Lucky's Tale is a "solid port of an underrated platformer with a greatly improved camera. It's a little on the short side and may not provide much of a challenge to more hardened gamers – and if you already own it on Xbox One there really isn't enough 'new' here to warrant a second purchase – but what makes it worth a look is its uncanny ability to make you smile, and this is something that can't be overlooked, especially in modern times".

John Cal McCormick gave a positive review: he found the game to be "relentlessly jolly" at "just the right length", and is amused by the option of dressing Lucky up like Indiana Jones, but disapproved of the excessive loading screens as well as cutscenes which cannot be skipped when replaying levels.
