= Super Monsters Furever Friends =

2019 animation TV special

- Genre: Children's television; Animated
- Starring: Elyse Maloway; Vincent Tong; Erin Mathews
- Music by: Brian Reitzell
- Country of origin: United States
- Original language: English

Production
- Running time: 58 minutes

Original release
- Release: April 16, 2019

Super Monsters Furever Friends is a 2018 American animation children's comedy television special starring Elyse Maloway, Vincent Tong and Erin Mathews set in the Super Monsters universe. With its length at 58 minutes, and the introduction of superpowered monster pets into the series, it is a significant expansion of the Super Monsters universe.

It was released on April 16, 2019, on Netflix.

== Premise ==
To celebrate the first day of spring, the Super Monsters and their parents has a picnic-party in the park. When the sun goes down, Cleo the mummy, Drac the vampire, Frankie the Frankenstein's monster, Katya the witch, Lobo the werewolf, Zoe the zombie, and Spike the dragon boy, transform from human to monster form. They soon discover that they can forge a magical bond with animals.

== Cast ==
- Elyse Maloway as Cleo / Mrs. Snow (voice)
- Vincent Tong as Drac / Luigi / Mr. Gabmore (voice)
- Erin Mathews as Frankie / Mrs. Mash / Sami / Griffy (voice)
- Andrea Libman as Katya (voice)
- Alessandro Juliani as Lobo / Mr. Howler (voice)
- Nicole Anthony as Zoe / Mrs. Carradine (voice)
- Diana Kaarina as Spike / Mrs. Gong (voice)
- Ian James Corlett as Igor (voice)
- Britt McKillip as Esmie (voice)
- Kathleen Barr as Glorb / Herri (voice)
- Nicole Oliver as Mrs. Graves (voice)
- Elishia Perosa as Ms. Spelling (voice)
- Nathan Witte as Dr. Walker (voice)
- Edward Foy as Count Dracula (voice)
- Maria J. Cruz as Abuelita (voice)

== Release ==
Super Monsters Furever Friends was released on April 16, 2019, on Netflix.
