= Zoids Wild =

Anime series based on toy modeling

- Announcement poster

ZOIDS ゾイド ワイルド (Zoido Wairudo)
- Genre: Adventure, Mecha
- Manga
- Written by: Moricha
- Published by: Shogakukan
- Magazine: CoroCoro Comic
- Original run: April 2018 – May 2019
- Volumes: 3
- Anime television series
- Directed by: Norihiko Sudō
- Written by: Mitsutaka Hirota
- Music by: Noriyuki Asakura
- Studio: OLM Team Sakurai
- Licensed by: NA: Hasbro Netflix (streaming rights outside Asia)
- Original network: JNN (MBS, TBS)
- English network: PH: Cartoon Network; SG: Okto
- Original run: July 7, 2018 – June 29, 2019
- Episodes: 50
- Video game

Zoids Wild: King of Blast / Blast Unleashed
- Developer: Eighting
- Publisher: JP/AS: Takara Tomy; WW: Outright Games
- Genre: Action
- Engine: Unity
- Platform: Nintendo Switch
- Released: JP: February 28, 2019; WW: October 16, 2020
- Video game

Zoids Wild: Infinity Blast
- Publisher: Takara Tomy
- Genre: Action
- Platform: Nintendo Switch
- Released: JP: November 26, 2020
- Manga

Zoids Wild 2
- Written by: Moricha
- Published by: Shogakukan
- Magazine: CoroCoro Comic
- Original run: September 2019 – October 2020
- Volumes: 4
- Anime television series

Zoids Wild Zero
- Directed by: Takao Kato
- Written by: Kenichi Araki
- Music by: Yoshihisa Hirano
- Studio: OLM Team Masuda
- Original network: TXN (TV Tokyo, TV Osaka)
- Original run: October 4, 2019 – October 16, 2020
- Episodes: 50
- Original net animation

Zoids Wild Senki
- Directed by: Takao Kato
- Written by: Kenichi Araki
- Music by: Yoshihisa Hirano
- Studio: OLM Digital
- Released: October 17, 2020 – March 12, 2021
- Runtime: 4 minutes (each)
- Episodes: 6
- Other series
- List of all Zoids series

Zoids Wild (ZOIDS ゾイド ワイルド, Zoido Wairudo) is an anime series based on the Zoids model kits produced by Takara Tomy. The 5th Zoids anime, the anime is part of a cross-media relaunch of the franchise encompassing a new toy line, manga series, and video game for the Nintendo Switch, which were predominantly aimed at boys aged 10–12. Streamed from 7 July 2018 to 29 June 2019, this was the final series produced by Allspark Animation before being absorbed into Entertainment One (now Lionsgate Canada) on 9 October 2020.

== Characters ==
=== Main characters ===
Arashi (アラシ)
Voiced by: Kenshō Ono (Japanese); Cole Howard; Thomas Love (child) (English)
Arashi is a villager who joins Team Freedom after acquiring the legendary Zoid Liger through chance. He eventually wins the Zoid's trust and is trained by Quade to master Wild Blast, with Liger able to master his trademark action "King Claw" (King of the Claw in Japanese), and later its variant "Ultra King Claw" (King of Claw Spiral in Japanese). However, Quade's death at Gigaboss's hands causes Arashi to enter a raging Berserk mode that increases Liger's power at the cost of attacking both friends and foes alike. After the fall of the Dark Metal Empire, Arashi and Liger part ways with their team to travel.

Quade (ベーコン, Bēkon; Bacon)
Voiced by: Takahiro Sakurai (Japanese); Michael Adamthwaite (English)
Team Supreme's founding leader and a famous, powerful Zoid Seeker whose Zoid partner is Zaber Fang. Quade initially sought out Liger alongside the mysterious "Ancient Treasure Z" before meeting Arashi. He mentors the youth before resuming his search for "Ancient Treasure Z". Despite not being a member of the resistance, Quade openly opposes his former friend Gigaboss, as he stole half of Demise's hacker key before giving it to Arashi prior to his death by the emperor's hand. Quade appears as a spirit before his allies, enabling Zaber Fang to fight alongside them. Quade had also met Arashi's father, Apex, and Mitsuba before the events of the series took place.

Battalia (ペンネ, Penne)
Voiced by: Mikako Komatsu (Japanese); Maryke Hendrikse (English)
Battalia is an orphan whose parents were killed by bandits when she was a child. She becomes a bounty hunter to provide funding for the orphanage she lived in with her Scorpear-type Zoid partner, Needle. She ends up under the employ of the Dark Metal Empire's Numb-lock after impressing him with her skills. He tasks her with taking down 100 bounties for the Empire in exchange for a fortune that would allow her to support her orphanage. However, after meeting Arashi and becoming the first member of Team Freedom prior to learning Arashi is her final bounty, she eventually sides with her friends.

Analog (オニギリ, Onigiri)
Voiced by: Etsuko Kozakura (Japanese); Samuel Vincent (English)
Tanks' pilot is a member of Team Freedom who has a strong passion for Zoids, which is common for many characters in the show who introduce their Zoids with great enthusiasm. When a new Zoid appears, Analog explains its name, type, and abilities. This can happen even when Analog is nowhere near the Zoid in question. Analog was initially a slave of the Dark Metal Empire. He was forced to perform Hacker Key experiments. For his own survival, he performed many of those experiments on Tanks, which filled him with guilt for a long time. After meeting Arashi, Analog summons the courage to revolt against his captors, which moves Tanks to give him its Zoid Key.

Bastion (ギョーザ, Gyōza)
Voiced by: Subaru Kimura (Japanese); Alex Barima (English)
A Team Freedom member and pilot of the Triceratops-like Zoid, Tryke. Bastion is a powerful pilot who uses his affinity for rap and dance to boost Tryke's fighting ability. His Zoid is relatively slow compared to the rest of the cast, but very effective at close range. Bastion started as a stingy pilot motivated only by money, which put him at odds with Arashi. It's later revealed that his desire for money is to buy expensive medicine from the Dark Metal Empire for his ailing sister. When he tries to steal medicine from Haxile of Dark Warriors, Bastion learns that he was being conned by the Empire. This makes him change his stingy ways, which earns him Tryke's Zoid Key and a place on Team Freedom.

Apex (ソルト, Soruto; Salt)
Voiced by: Yūma Uchida (Japanese); David A. Kaye (English)
A Team Freedom member and pilot of the Hunter Wolf (ハンターウルフ, Hantā Urufu)-type Zoid, Alpha Shadow, who raised him after his father accidentally abandoned him while protecting him from a wild Zoid. He became determined to prove he was the best Zoid pilot in the world. Apex initially believed that friends were unnecessary, but his rivalry with Arashi slowly changed his views. Apex is a powerful pilot, and is the only one in the series to use the "Second Gear" ability of Wild Blast. He is assumed dead following his fight with Numb-Lock, with his teammates unaware that he resumed traveling alone. The English dub edits him into scenes of the final episode.

Snare (ヨウカン, Youkan)
Voiced by: Ami Koshimizu (Japanese); Rhona Rhees (English)
A Team Freedom member and pilot of the spider-like Zoid, Phobia, Snare is a mysterious treasure hunter with a keen eye who steals from those aligned with the Dark Metal Empire.

Drake (ドレイク, Doreiku)
Voiced by: Kaito Ishikawa (Japanese); Adrian Petriw (English)
One of the Four Dark Warriors of the Dark Metal Empire and pilot of the Gilraptor-type Zoid, Ruin. Drake was the child of two archeologists who taught him to love and respect Zoids. Seeking funding for their work, the couple took Drake, Ruin, and another Gilraptor with them to the Dark Metal Empire. After his parents sacrificed themselves in failed attempt for him and their Zoids to escape, Drake was forced to become an obedient servant after being compelled to choose Ruin, while white Gilraptor was killed and fed to Demise. After numerous failed attempts to capture Arashi, Drake acquires a Zoid Key after acknowledging his bond with Ruin, leaving the Empire to aid Team Freedom in the final battle.

=== Supporting characters ===
Dyna / Sauce (ソース, Sōsu)
Voiced by: Ami Koshimizu (Japanese); Chiara Zanni (English)
Member of the Supreme Team and pilot of Winghorn.

Shades / Candy (キャンディ, Kyandi)
Voiced by: Yōji Ikuta (Japanese); Adrian Petriw (English)
Member of the Supreme Team and pilot of Flyhorn.

Scrapes / Avocado (アボカド, Abokado)
Voiced by: Hayato Kimura (Japanese); Andrew Cownden (English)
Member of the Supreme Team and pilot of Ankylosaurus Zoid, Knockz.

Pach / Garlic (ガーリック, Gārikku)
Voiced by: Kōtarō Nishiyama (Japanese); Gabe Khouth (episodes 1-19); James Higuchi (episodes 20-50) (English)
Member of the Supreme Team and pilot of the Pachycephhlosaurus Zoid, Rash.

Ikazuchi (イカヅチ, Ikazuchi)
Voiced by: Takuya Kirimoto (Japanese); Ian Hanlin (English)
Arashi's father.

Gaffer / Taifu (タイフウ, Taifuu)
Voiced by: Hideyuki Umezu (Japanese); Ron Halder (English)
Arashi's grandfather.

Greta / Sanratan (サンラータン)
Voiced by: Suzuko Mimori (Japanese); Kazumi Evans (English)
Greta is a transporter and does not participate in battle. However, she has an extremely strong bond with her Silkworm Zoid, Spineless.

Master Bug / Mushi Sennin (ムシ仙人)
Voiced by: Kappei Yamaguchi (Japanese); Richard Ian Cox (English)
Master Bug is a strange man who makes up stories in his spare time. Due to his lack of contact with the outside world, he is largely oblivious to current events happening around him and has an intense desire for reading books to fill the time. Master Bug is a master Zoid pilot. His skills are second to none. He is easily able to take on many Zoids at once, even fighting the three members of Team Freedom simultaneously, without any effort.

=== Dark Metal Empire ===
Marcellus / Gigaboss (ギャラガー, Gyaragar; Gallagar)
Voiced by: Tomokazu Seki (Japanese); Andrew Cownden (English)
The eccentric but ruthless leader of the Dark Metal Empire, he is cruel to his subordinates and seeks stronger Zoids to pilot. He was originally a friend of Quade, as they both trained under Master Bug, until learning of the legendary Zoid Demise (デスレックス, Desu Rekkusu, Death Rex), also known as "Ancient Treasure Z", who devours other Zoids to become stronger. Gigaboss establishes the Dark Metal Empire to revive Demise, before losing half of the original Hacker Key to Quade. He commissions the creation of Hacker Key copies so that he can tame Demise. While succeeding in acquiring the key, Gigaboss ends up orchestrating his death when Demise is knocked back into the volcano he was excavated from.

Malware (キャビア, Kyabia; Caviar)
Voiced by: Tōru Nara (Japanese); Peter New (English)
A member of Dark Metal Empire's Four Dark Warriors and a mad scientist who uses deception in battle while upgrading his Alligator Zoid, Overbyte, replacing the Zoid with the mind-controlled Knockz.

Numb-Lock (フォアグラ, Foagura; Foie gras)
Voiced by: Rikiya Koyama (Japanese); Mark Gibbon (English)
A drum-playing member of the Dark Metal Empire's Four Dark Warriors and pilot of the gorilla Zoid, Dragz.

Haxile (トリュフ, Toryufu; Truffle)
Voiced by: Nobuyuki Hiyama (Japanese); Michael Dobson (English)
A member of the Dark Metal Empire's Four Dark Warriors and a master tactician. He originally pilots the stegosaurus-like Zoid, Bonesaw, before replacing it with the dimetrodon-like Zoid, Dimomite, upgraded with Demise's cells, giving him the ability to brainwash other Zoids and convert them to the Dark Metal Empire's cause.

=== Zoids Wild Zero ===
Leo Conrad (レオ・コンラッド, Reo Konraddo)
Voiced by: Shō Nogami
Sally Land (サリー・ランド, Sarī Rando)
Voiced by: Hazuki Senda
Buzz Cunningham (バズ・カニンガム, Bazu Kaningamu)
Voiced by: Makoto Yasumura
Jo Aysel (ジョー・アイセル, Jō Aiseru)
Voiced by: Yōko Hikasa
Christopher Giller (クリストファー・ギレル, Kurisutofā Gireru)
Voiced by: Toshiki Masuda
Luc (リュック, Ryukku)
Voiced by: Daisuke Kishio
Clive Dias (クライブ・ディアス, Kuraibu Diasu)
Voiced by: Satoshi Mikami
Walter Borman (ウォルター・ボーマン, Worutā Bōman)
Voiced by: Yoshito Yasuhara
Electora Gate

== Media ==
=== Manga ===
A manga series by Moricha began monthly serialization in Shogakukan's CoroCoro Comic magazine from April 2018 to May 2019.

| No. | Release date | ISBN |
|---|---|---|
| 1 | August 28, 2018 | 978-4-09-142760-1 |
| 2 | December 28, 2018 | 978-4-09-142838-7 |
| 3 | June 28, 2019 | 978-4-09-142899-8 |

A sequel series, also by Moricha, began serialization from September 2019 to October 2020.

| No. | Release date | ISBN |
|---|---|---|
| 1 | December 27, 2019 | 978-4-09-143136-3 |
| 2 | June 26, 2020 | 978-4-09-143203-2 |
| 3 | December 25, 2020 | 978-4-09-143255-1 |
| 4 | August 30, 2021 | 978-4-09-143313-8 |

=== Anime ===
Wild aired on Mainichi Broadcasting System and Tokyo Broadcasting System from July 7, 2018, to June 29, 2019 in addition to other networks. Inspired by Moricha's manga, the series is produced by OLM, directed by Norihiko Sudō and written by Mitsutaka Hirota. On June 22, 2019, it was announced that Zoids Wild would end on June 29, 2019.

On October 1, 2018, it was reported that Hasbro currently has plans to bring Zoids Wild to North America with Hasbro Studios (now Allspark) licensing the anime for an English dub, which was tentatively titled Zoids: Build Them to Life. before being retitled to just Zoids and then back to its original title. The dub is produced by Ocean Productions.

The first half of the dub released on Netflix on August 14, 2020 and then second half on October 3, the latter originally slated to be released two days earlier. The dub was removed from Netflix on August 15, 2022. A Hong Kong-produced English dub began airing on Cartoon Network in the Philippines on March 2, 2019. It also aired in Singapore on Okto on April 8, before moving to Channel 5 the following month due to Okto's closure.

A second season, titled Zoids Wild Zero has been announced, featuring a brand-new story with new characters, directed by Takao Kato and written by Kenichi Araki. The second season aired from October 4, 2019 to October 16, 2020, on TV Tokyo. On May 22, 2020, it was announced further episodes would delayed due to the COVID-19 pandemic. On June 11, 2020, it was announced the anime would return on June 19, 2020.

In September 2020, it was announced Zoids Wild Senki, a CG-animated miniseries released on YouTube, on the CoroCoro's, Takara Tomy's YouTube channels, starting from October 17, 2020.

=== Video games ===
An arcade game called Zoids Wild: Battle Card Hunter (ゾイドワイルド バトルカードハンター, Zoido Wairudo: Batoru Kādo Hantā) was released by Takara Tomy in Japan on January 24, 2019. It was followed by the Nintendo Switch title, Zoids Wild: King of Blast (ゾイドワイルド キング オブ ブラスト, Zoido Wairudo: Kingu Obu Burasuto) action game developed by Eighting on February 28, 2019. Outright Games released the title in Australia, Europe and North America as Zoids Wild: Blast Unleashed on October 16, 2020. A sequel, entitled Zoids Wild: Infinity Blast, was released November 26, 2020 on Nintendo Switch in Japan. A digital card game called Zoids Wild Arena was released globally (excluding China, Japan and South Korea) by Act Games for Android devices on April 3, 2023. Service ended on March 6, 2025.
