= Adrian Petriw =

Canadian actor

- Occupation: Actor
- Years active: 2004–present
- Agent: RED Management / Performers Management
- Website: www.adrianpetriw.com

Adrian Petriw is a Canadian television, film and voice actor. He is best known for his voice role of Tony Stark / Iron Man in the television series Iron Man: Armored Adventures, Commander Gren in The Dragon Prince, and Adam in The Hollow. His notable film and television credits include Legends of Tomorrow, Loudermilk, Van Helsing, iZombie, Lucifer, Hell On Wheels, Arrow, and Project Mc^{2}. His first voice acting role was in Next Avengers: Heroes of Tomorrow.

== Personal life ==
Petriw is of Ukrainian descent.

Petriw's nephew Dean is also an actor and has roles in Home Before Dark and My Life with the Walter Boys.

== Filmography ==
=== Film ===
Year	Title	Role	Notes
2008	Next Avengers: Heroes of Tomorrow	Francis Barton / Hawkeye	Direct-to-video
2010	Barbie: A Fashion Fairy Tale	Ken	Direct-to-video
2011	Barbie: A Fairy Secret	Ken	Direct-to-video
2012	Barbie: The Princess & the Popstar	Prince Liam	Direct-to-video
2013	Escape from Planet Earth	Snark Beast	
2015	Barbie in Rock'n Royals	Prince Edmund	Direct-to-video
2016	Max Steel: Team Turbo	Alex Villar	
2017	Barbie: Dolphin Magic	Ken	

=== Television ===
Year	Title	Role	Notes
2003–2005	Edgemont	Mitch	Recurring role
2004	Dead Like Me	Cadet (uncredited)	Episode: "Last Call"
2006	Broken House	Brown	Short film
2006	Romeo!	Omar	Episode: "The Tipping Point"
2006	Blowburn	Joe	Short film
2007	The Deadly Pledge	Oliver	
2007	Nana	Naoki (voice)	34 episodes
2008	Gods of Youth	Bing	Also known as: Candyland
2008	Kurozuka	Kuon Prime (voice)	2 episodes
2009	Zombie Punch	Dan	
2009–2012	Iron Man: Armored Adventures	Tony Stark / Iron Man (voice)	Main role (52 episodes)
2010	Tower Prep	Lazlo	Episode: "Whisper"
2010–2012	Hero: 108	Sparky Black, Woo the Wise (voice)	25 episodes
2011	two x 4	Sammy (voice)	Short film
2011–2014	Dinosaur Train	Vlad Volaticotherium (voice)	3 episodes
2013	The Killing	Uniformed Cop	Episode: "Hope Kills"
2013	Almost Home	Man on Beach	Short film
2014	Arrow	Driver	Episode: "Streets of Fire"
2014	Continuum	Short Nerdiac	Episode: "The Dying Minutes"
2014	Danball Senki	Hanz (voice)	
2014	LoliRock	Matt	Episode: "Be Mine"
2015	When Sparks Fly	Young Man	Television film
2015	At Your Feet	The Shoe	
2015	Hell on Wheels	Pratt	Episode: "Mei Mei"
2015	Exchange Student Zero	Prince Castillan (voice)	Episode: "Prince Harming"
2015	Lego Star Wars: Droid Tales	Ezra Bridger (voice)	Episode: "Mission to Mos Eisley"
2015	Who Killed My Husband	Ben Doughty	Television film
2015–2016	Gintama	Sagaru Yamazaki (voice)	17 episodes
2015–2018	Scout and the Gumboot Kids	Scout (voice)	60 episodes
2016–2018	Beyblade Burst	Shu Kurenai	61 episodes
2016	Project Mc^{2}	Retro/Kevin Glitterman	Episode: "Bye Bye Birdie"
2016	Interrogation	Tech	
2016	Max Steel Team Turbo	Alex (voice)	
2016	Slugterra	Tad Blakk (voice)	4 episodes
2016	Superbook	Various voices	6 episodes
2017	Marvel Super Hero Adventures	Ant-Man (voice)	2 episodes
2017	Woman on the Run	Concierge (voice)	Television film
2017	Lucifer	Tourettes Todd	Episode: "God Johnson"
2017	iZombie	Rudy "Pooh" Bachman	Episode: "Eat a Knievel"
2018	Nina's World	Computer (voice)	Episode: "Sky High Mystery"
2018	Take Two	Tech Officer	Episode: "It Takes a Thief"
2018	World Trigger	Shuuji Miwa (voice)	Episode: "The End of the Battle"
2018	Tobot	Tom Fuse	15 episodes
2018	Lego Jurassic World: The Secret Exhibit	Danny Nedermeyer	2 episodes
2018	Noah Wise	Debt Collector (voice)	
2018	The Shipment	The Mechanic	Short film
2018	Homegrown Christmas	Pat McCrull (uncredited)	Television film
2018	A Midnight Kiss	Paul Redinger	Television film
2018–2020	The Hollow	Adam (voice)	20 episodes
2018–2024	The Dragon Prince	Gren	21 episodes
2019	Lego Jurassic World: Legend of Isla Nublar	Danny Nedermeyer	13 episodes
2019	Fast Layne	Alonzo (voice)	Recurring role
2019	Morning Show Mysteries	Librarian	Episode: "Death by Design"
2019	Legends of Tomorrow	Rick	Episode: "Egg MacGuffin"
2019	Van Helsing	Colin	Episode: "Broken Promises"
2019	Holiday Hearts	Freddy	Television film
2019–2022	Ninjago	Fugi-Dove, Scott	10 episodes
2020	Zoids Wild	Drake (voice)	
2020	Lego Marvel Avengers: Climate Conundrum	Clint Barton / Hawkeye (voice)	
2020	The Healing Powers of Dude	Floyd (voice)	Episode: "Getting to Know You"
2020	Loudermilk	Colton	Episode: "There Goes My Baby"
2020–2021	StarBeam	Henry Blumenshine/Boost (voice)	35 episodes
2021	Crossword Mysteries: Terminal Descent	Eisner Employee	Television film
2021	Mystery 101	Jeffrey Lewandowski	Episode: "Killer Timing"
2021	Debris	Orbital Tech	Episode: "Supernova"
2021	Lego Marvel Avengers: Loki in Training	Clint Barton / Hawkeye (voice)	
2021	Turner & Hooch	Arthur Stilts	Episode: "Arf Appreciation"
2022	Lego Marvel Avengers: Time Twisted	Clint Barton / Hawkeye (voice)	
2022	The Guava Juice Show	Guava Juice (voice)	

=== Video games ===
Year	Title	Role	Notes
2016	Dead Rising 4	Male Survivors	
2017	Thimbleweed Park	Additional voices	
2018	Dragalia Lost	Norwin, Grimnir	
2020	Zoids Wild: Blast Unleashed	Drake	
