= StarBeam =

Web TV series from Netflix

- Genre: Superhero; Preschool; Science fiction Animated sitcom
- Created by: Loris Lunsford; Jason Netter
- Written by: Noelle Wright
- Directed by: Johnny Darrell
- Voices of: Nahanni Mitchell; Dean Petriw
- Theme music composer: Earworm Sound
- Opening theme: "StarBeam Theme" by Kathryn Rende
- Composer: Jim Latham
- Countries of origin: United States; Canada
- Original language: English
- No. of seasons: 4
- No. of episodes: 35

Production
- Executive producers: Loris Kramer Lunsford; Jason Netter; Heather Puttock
- Editors: Peter Faint; Kerr Holden
- Running time: 11-14 minutes
- Production companies: Kickstart Entertainment; Netflix Animation Studios

Original release
- Network: Netflix
- Release: April 3, 2020 – December 14, 2021

StarBeam is a superhero animated television series created for Netflix by Loris Lunsford and Jason Netter. The show follows Zoey (voiced by Nahanni Mitchell), a young girl who is a superhero.

The first season of the series premiered on Netflix on April 3, 2020, followed by a second season on September 8, 2020. A third season debuted on a March 9, 2021 release. Season 4 debuted on June 29, 2021, introducing a new format in the last few episodes.

A Halloween special, StarBeam: Halloween Hero, was released on October 6, 2020.

A New Years' special, StarBeam: Beaming in the New Year, was released on December 14, 2021.

== Synopsis ==
The show is based on Zoey, a girl in second grade. StarBeam, a superhero with unusual powers, including super-speed, super-strength, flight, high-velocity wind breathing, and the power to build force fields with bubbles, is Zoey's alter-ego. With her catchphrase, "It's time to shine!" Zoey turns into StarBeam. Zoey inherited her superpowers from her superhero mother, WonderBeam, and follows the theme of family superheroes.

Only a few people are aware of her hidden existence in Zoey's world. These individuals include her "Gramps" non-superpower grandfather; her closest friend, Henry, a "Boost" superhero who invents devices that strengthen his superhero abilities; and a friend who gives moral encouragement, their seagull sidekick, "Kipper." Gramps, Boost, and Kipper, together, always assist Zoey to save the day.

== Characters ==
=== Main ===
- Zoey/StarBeam (voiced by Nahanni Mitchell) is the main heroine. Typically energetic and strong-willed, Zoey is very playful and excitable. StarBeam's powers are bubble-based, though she also has super breath in addition to flight, super strength, and super speed. StarBeam's suit has also changed appearances framed depending on the mission, from manifesting as a spacesuit to giving her a mermaid tail for underwater missions.
- Henry Blumenshine/Boost (voiced by Dean Petriw) is Zoey's best friend. Henry is the son of Mayor Blumenshine, who is unaware of his superhero identity as much as Zoey's. Henry is relatively more scientific and down to earth than Zoey, but he does enjoy much of the same activities that she likes. Unlike StarBeam, Boost lacks natural superpowers, including super strength and flight, and instead uses a menagerie of high-tech gadgets and inventions to assist any way he can.
- Gramps/AlphaBeam (voiced by Terry Klassen) is Zoey's grandfather and the father of WonderBeam. Gramps lacks any superpowers compared to Zoey and her mom, but his main role is mission control; he works in Beam Control at the lighthouse to watch for villains and other emergencies. Gramps has a calming presence, and gives Zoey words of wisdom when things get hairy in a mission. In his downtime, he enjoys fishing at the dock outside. Although he lacks natural superpowers, like Boost he makes use of a high-tech suit as a superhero, first doing so in the New Years' special.
- Kipper (voiced by Sam Vincent) is Zoey's pet seagull and accompanies her on her missions. Kipper is notably food-minded, as his primary motive, aside from helping StarBeam, is to constantly snack on miscellaneous foodstuffs, which can get him and/or the mission in big trouble.
- Zoey's Mom/WonderBeam (voiced by Diana Kaarina) is Zoey's mother as well as Gramps' daughter. Zoey's mom cares very much about her family, but like Zoey, she is dedicated to her duty as a superheroine. She shares StarBeam's powers of super strength, super speed and flight, but she uses more laser-derived superpowers in contrast to StarBeam's bubbles, including a laser cage that renders all superpowers unusable.

=== Villains ===
- Captain Fishbeard (voiced by Sam Vincent) is a pirate who, much like a few species of birds, kleptomaniacally takes whatever shiny objects he sees, no matter how worthless much of them are. Fishbeard captains a flying pirate ship known as the Delores, and he has a gecko named Leonard instead of a parrot as with most pirates. Rather than a typical pirate accent, he uses a hoarse American accent whenever he speaks.
- Miserable Marla (voiced by Maryke Hendrikse) is a blue-skinned girl with freckles and generally drab clothing. True to her name, Marla acts miserable when others are enjoying themselves, and she delights in spreading misery to the citizens of Summersette. Marla can levitate in mid-air, and while capable of generating wind, she primarily controls cloud-based weather, namely rain, snow or lightning as well as static electricity. She is sometimes accompanied by a number of sentient storm clouds, but she otherwise goes solo in her schemes.
- Cosmic Crusher (voiced by Vincent Tong) is a large muscular man. Crusher is highly arrogant and believes himself to be the best dancer in all of Summersette, usually arriving to a captive audience. Twice however, his defeat comes from his overconfidence, which allows StarBeam and Boost to outsmart and defeat him. Cosmic Crusher has super strength and advanced dance moves, but his ego often hampers his performance.
- Goop (voiced by Sam Vincent) is a green and purple three-eyed alien-like being who appeared sporadically throughout the series (mostly under the servitude of his master Todd). He is idiotically ditzy and partially go-lucky, but he is loyal and enjoys helping his boss, though he is a bit of a coward. Goop is able to transform his body into many different forms, though a focused beam of light can force him back into his true shape.
- Todd (voiced by Sam Vincent) is a short purple being in a black and yellow outfit whole is widely known to Zoey's family as the most troublesome villain in all of Summersette's knowledge. Todd is extremely mad and dramatic, though while he is malicious, he is always foiled due to some of his drawbacks, abusing his servant Goop being among them. Todd's primary (and seemingly only) superpower is his ability to grow at will, though he can often get arrogant when doing so. He only appeared via mentions or through communication windows between him and Goop, but debuted in person during the Season 3 premiere.
- Tricksy the Pixie (voiced by Diana Kaarina) is a mischievous fairy who enjoys causing problems around Summersette. Tricksy has arachnophobia but delights in playing pranks in peaceful environments, ranging from switching trail signs to swapping a hot dog for a snail. She often revels in her tricks, but has shown sympathy in her debut. She affectionately refers to her magic wand as "Wanda", and often leaves with a good laugh. Tricksy only reverses the effects of her pranks after somebody pranks her back. She was introduced in Season 3.
- Mystery Villain (voiced by Shannon Chan-Kent) is an unknown character who hired Cosmic Crusher, Fishbeard, and Miserable Marla to sabotage the New Year.

=== Others ===
- Ms. Winkleman (voiced by Laara Sadiq) is a teacher at the school where Henry and Zoey attend.
- Mayor Blumenshine (voiced by Rhona Rees) is the mayor of Summersette and the mother of Henry/Boost. As with much of the other characters, Blumenshine is unaware of Henry and Zoey's superhero identities, but she does appreciate their help to a great extent. Her name is a pun on the words "bloom and shine".
- Luna Diaz (voiced by Sarah Almonte Peguero) is an astronaut who works for an unknown space program in Summersette. Diaz was a local hero of the Summersette citizens, and she researched the possibilities of growing plants in outer space.
- Ms. Fawkes is a photographer who takes pictures for the local school.
- Stella (voiced by Abigail Journey Oliver) is a young redhead girl with glasses, pigtails and braces who is one of Zoey and Henry's classmates and friends. Stella is known to everyone else as a huge StarBeam superfan, even crafting herself a costume based on StarBeam's uniform.
- Greta and Gunther (voiced by Jaeda Lily Miller and Zion Simpson respectively) are Zoey and Henry's twin classmates.
- Zak (voiced by Orlando Lucas) is Zoey and Henry's paraplegic classmate.
- Zara/EchoBeam (voiced by Kyla Blackmore) is Zoey's cousin. Like Gramps and Boost, her superhero identity uses a high-tech suit and her guitar she also has music power.

== Episodes ==
=== Series overview ===
Season	Episodes	Originally released
1	8	April 3, 2020
2	8	September 8, 2020
Halloween Special	1	October 6, 2020
3	9	March 9, 2021
4	8	June 29, 2021
New Year Special	1	December 14, 2021

=== Season 1 (2020) ===
No. overall	No. in season	Title	Original release date
1	1	"Something's Fishy"	April 3, 2020
Captain Fishbeard begins stealing shiny objects all over Summersette on Fun Food Friday, and it is up to both StarBeam and Boost to try to stop him from stealing the city hall bell.
2	2	"Gotcha Goop"	April 3, 2020
On Gramps's birthday, Goop manages to enter the lighthouse on a mission from Todd to infiltrate Beam Control, forcing StarBeam, Boost and WonderBeam to find him before he gets the key needed to free Todd and before the birthday party begins.
3	3	"Picture Day"	April 3, 2020
Miserable Marla sets out to ruin picture day by overloading the school building with static electricity. While Henry tries to fix things in the classroom, StarBeam must figure out how to stop the static storm.
4	4	"Spaced Out"	April 3, 2020
Local Summersette astronaut Luna Diez encounters a meteor shower that dislodges the fuel tank from her Space Shuttle, and with Kipper by her side, StarBeam sets out to make sure Diez returns safely with Boost transmitting repair instructions from Beam Control.
5	5	"Dancing Shoes"	April 3, 2020
Zoey is struggling to master a move for her dance recital, so Henry gives her some high-tech dance shoes to help her practice. Zoey chooses to use them in the recital, and stuck to her feet they begin malfunctioning just as Cosmic Crushter begins attack the school before the recital, and even as StarBeam they remain stuck on her.
6	6	"Delores in Distress"	April 3, 2020
After Captain Fishbeard steals a jewel from a volcanic island, the island begins attacking him for his misdeed and he is forced to return it with the help of StarBeam.
7	7	"Critter Sitter"	April 3, 2020
Zoey has to take care of Quincy the classroom caterpillar for one day, but he ends up hatching out of his chrysalis and flies out into town as a butterfly. Zoey is then forced to chase him as StarBeam to get him back, with Boost and Kipper by her side.
8	8	"Super Sniffles"	April 3, 2020
Zoey's mom has contracted the super sniffles and cannot control her powers. While Henry and Gramps try to modify a citron fruit to make a super tea, Zoey has to struggle to keep her mom in bed, which gets harder as Miserable Marla sets out to worsen WonderBeam's condition.

=== Season 2 (2020) ===
No. overall	No. in season	Title	Original release date
9	1	"Friendsnatcher from Outer Space"	September 8, 2020
A mysterious meteorite arrives on planet Earth and is revealed to be a UFO. The extraterrestrial inside also seems interested in a meteor in the Summersette museum, forcing StarBeam and Boost to try to keep him out of trouble.
10	2	"Superfan"	September 8, 2020
Zoey has to deal with Stella, a StarBeam Superfan, just as Cosmic Crushter begins causing problems, also almost coming to harm's way as StarBeam tries to stop him.
11	3	"Clean Machine"	September 8, 2020
Zoey and Henry end up making a supersized mess in the house and when Henry's cleaning robot goes haywire, StarBeam and Boost must hurry before Zoey's mom returns.
12	4	"Mother's Day Mayhem"	September 8, 2020
Zoey and Henry plan on gifting flowers to their mothers on Mother's Day, but Miserable Marla finds beautiful flowers to be repulsive, and StarBeam and Boost are forced to try to stop her from flooding the community garden and ruining the flowers.
13	5	"Whale Tale"	September 8, 2020
StarBeam and Boost set off underwater to help a whale calf tangled in a fishing net, but the young aquatic mammal keeps swimming away.
14	6	"Fishstick Fiasco"	September 8, 2020
It's fishstick Friday at lunchtime, and Captain Fishbeard is hoarding all off the fishsticks he can find. To save the day, StarBeam must teach him the value of sharing with others.
15	7	"Snacktime for Stewart"	September 8, 2020
StarBeam must find a runaway sea snail before he dies. Already not a fan of snails, things get problematic when the snail is enlarged by a mistaken shot from Boost's new invention.
16	8	"Super Playdate"	September 8, 2020
Greta and Gunther arrive at the lighthouse for a playdate, but Goop manages to enter the premises, forcing StarBeam and Boost to send him on his way before things take a turn for the worse.

=== Halloween Special (2020) ===
No. overall	No. in season	Title	Original release date
17	S1	"StarBeam: Halloween Hero"	October 6, 2020
Halloween is essentially ruined for the people of Summersette when Captain Fishbeard steals all the candy and the prize for a costume contest, forcing StarBeam and Boost to step into action. Meanwhile, Kipper sets out to try to steal candy from a bowl that Gramps set up specifically for Trick-or-treaters, but the gluttonous seagull is consistently foiled.

=== Season 3 (2021) ===
No. overall	No. in season	Title	Original release date
18	1	"Springing StarBeam"	March 9, 2021
When WonderBeam ends up trapped by Todd, StarBeam attempts multiple solo missions to save her mother, but after Todd successfully makes it to Summersette, StarBeam and WonderBeam realize that even superheroes need help, and all hands are on deck to prevent Todd from ruining Summersette's egg hunt.
19	2	"Tricky Trails"	March 9, 2021
When Zoey and Henry go on a hike with twins Greta and Gunther, they quickly find that Tricksy the Pixie is up to her usual pranks, and trying to keep their identities a secret, the 2 must keep Tricksy from pulling pranks that are too dangerous.
20	3	"SnowFoot"	March 9, 2021
Zoey and Henry take a snowy getaway to the Ilse of Brrr, but when Zoey finds a being known as SnowFoot has taken a snow bunny, StarBeam and Boost come in hot pursuit.
21	4	"Goopy Lunch"	March 9, 2021
While searching for the Beam Key to free Todd, Goop manages to lose it in Zoey's school lunchbox. Soon, StarBeam and Boost are on a mission: To get the Beam Key Back!
22	5	"Fishy Treasure"	March 9, 2021
When Captain Fishbeard steals a map from a museum, StarBeam and Boost find him trying to steal a diamond from a volcano, but both StarBeam and Fishbeard have to work together when their pets become endangered.
23	6	"Wonder Wheels"	March 9, 2021
On wheels day, where everybody rides their bicycles around, Tricksy the Pixie is up to her tricks, and StarBeam finds her dealing with a dangerous situation when Tricksy swaps Stella's bike with Boost's high-tech turbo cycle.
24	7	"You Can Crush This"	March 9, 2021
StarBeam has to deal with Cosmic Crusher causing trouble at a carnival, but all he does is cheat! Her resolve? Making sure he knows how to have fun without cheating.
25	8	"Blue Moon"	March 9, 2021
Miserable Marla is making sure nobody will be able to see the highly anticipated lunar eclipse, but although she manages to get rid of her, StarBeam still does not feel right for fooling the villain.
26	9	"Puppy Panic"	March 9, 2021
Ms. Winkleman leaves her puppy Rex under Zoey's care, but the day grows chaotic when Tricksy the Pixie swaps the puppy's form with a nearby inflatable T-rex, and turns him into a living dinosaur. StarBeam and Boost are now forced to take action.

=== Season 4 (2021) ===
No. overall	No. in season	Title	Original release date
27	1	"Beachy Blunder"	June 29, 2021
The group's beach day is prematurely ended when Tricksy swaps Gramps' human body for that of a giant snail and begins causing mischief in town, forcing StarBeam and Boost to think creatively.
28	2	"Tag Along"	June 29, 2021
Murp arrives on planet Earth on the run from a mysterious entity, and he will not stay long enough to tell StarBeam and Boost who he's running from.
29	3	"Clean Up Crush"	June 29, 2021
Cosmic Crusher tries to help out on a day meant for cleaning, but he only realizes he is doing more harm than good when he sends a boulder hurtling towards a goat farm.
30	4	"Beam BubbyLicious"	June 29, 2021
Zoey ends up with a severe set of supersonic hiccups after quickly downing a whole bottle of a fizzy drink, and as StarBeam is hampered constantly by her condition while trying to save a goat.
31	5	"Summersette Spectacular"	June 29, 2021
On the day of a special parade, StarBeam and Boost learn that Tricksy is up to her usual mischief, and they set off to stop her before she makes things too dangerous.
32	6	"Freeze!"	June 29, 2021
Henry develops a special freezing spray that renders anything it sprays completely frozen. It is stolen by Captain Fishbeard, who uses it to freeze everyone in town so he can loot them unimpeded. StarBeam is in hot pursuit of the pirate, while Boost has to develop a thawing agent before Fishbeard swipes the lighthouse crystal.
33	7	"Saving Kipper"	June 29, 2021
While the group explores Lava Lava Island, Kipper is befriended by a bird who takes him as a best friend. The bird will not let him leave, and StarBeam and Boost have to take drastic measures to save him.
34	8	"Critter Chaos"	June 29, 2021
Zoey and Henry plan a special music performance at an animal shelter to help some of the residing animals to find a forever home. The plan hits a snag at the main event when Tricksy swaps the instrument noises with the animal sounds, forcing StarBeam and Boost to take action.

=== StarBeam Shorts (2021) ===
Unusually, instead of being uploaded to the Netflix Jr. YouTube channel, the shorts are instead placed as episodes 9-16 of Season 4.

The first seven shorts are depicted as home movies made by Stella, a local of Summersettete known as a StarBeam Superfan to everyone else. The last short is a music video featuring an extended version of the StarBeam theme song, previously uploaded to YouTube as a form of promotion for the series.

- Gonzo for Gadgets
- Meeting Marla
- A Day on the Delores
- Tricking Like Tricksy
- StarBeam Style
- Kipper Cam
- Family Pictures
- Time to Shine

=== New Year Special (2021) ===
No. overall	No. in season	Title	Original release date
35	S2	"StarBeam: Beaming in the New Year"	December 14, 2021
Summersette's biggest baddies join forces on New Year’s Eve to battle Zoey and the Beam Team. But cool cousin Zara powers up to help save the day!

== Release ==
StarBeam was released on April 3, 2020. The series aired on Netflix.
