= Super Monsters =

2017 American children's television series

- Created by: Avi Arad
- Written by: Kaaren Lee Brown
- Directed by: Steve Ball; Jacob Joice
- Voices of: Elyse Maloway; Vincent Tong; Erin Mathews; Andrea Libman; Alessandro Juliani; Britt McKillip; Nicole Oliver; Ian James Corlett; Kathleen Barr; Brian Drummond; Diana Kaarina; Gigi Saul Guerrero
- Composer: Allen Bohbot
- Countries of origin: United States; Canada; United Kingdom
- Original language: English
- No. of seasons: 3
- No. of episodes: 22 + 10 specials

Production
- Executive producers: Avi Arad (season 1-2); Allen Bohbot
- Producers: Kaaren Lee Brown; Shea Wageman (season 1); Jennifer Rogan (season 2-3)
- Running time: 22-23 minutes
- Production companies: Arad Animation (2017-2018) (season 1-2); ICON Creative Studio; 41 Entertainment

Original release
- Network: Netflix
- Release: October 13, 2017 – June 1, 2021

Super Monsters is an animated children's television series that premiered on Netflix on October 13, 2017. The show is about a group of 12 preschool kids, the children of the world's most famous monsters, as they try to master their special powers while preparing for kindergarten.

Super Monsters Save Halloween was released on October 5, 2018. Super Monsters and the Wish Star was released on December 7, 2018. Super Monsters Furever Friends was released on April 16, 2019. Super Monsters Back to School was released on August 16, 2019. Super Monsters: Vida's First Halloween was released on October 4, 2019. Super Monsters Save Christmas was released on November 26, 2019. Super Monsters The New Class was released on August 1, 2020. Super Monsters Dia De Los Monsters was released on September 25, 2020. Super Monsters Santa's Super Monster Helpers was released on December 8, 2020. Super Monsters Once Upon A Rhyme was released on June 1, 2021.

The series made its linear debut on Discovery Family on October 19, 2019. The series was removed from Discovery Family on October 11, 2024. Select episodes of the show first appeared on TVNZ in 2023.

== Characters ==
=== Monsters ===
- Cleo Graves (voiced by Elyse Maloway) is a four-year-old student at Pitchfork Pines Preschool who is a Mummy with the power to create sandstorms and tornadoes. She had powered up and she has a hoverboard.
- Drac Shadows (voiced by Vincent Tong) is a four-year-old student at Pitchfork Pines Preschool who is a Vampire with the ability to fly in the air. He is the first one to transform into a monster. He powered up to teleport.
- Frankie Mash (voiced by Erin Mathews) is a four-year-old student at Pitchfork Pines Preschool who is a Frankenstein monster with super strength, and a big, super stomp. He powered up to grow big and then small.
- Katya Spelling (voiced by Andrea Libman) is a four-year-old student at Pitchfork Pines Preschool who is a young Witch, often struggling with her spellcasting. She powered up with more of her magic.
- Lobo Howler (voiced by Alessandro Juliani) is a three-year-old student at Pitchfork Pines Preschool who is a Werewolf with super speed. He powered up with the ability to slow time.
- Zoe Walker (voiced by Nicole Anthony) is a four-year-old student at Pitchfork Pines Preschool who is a Zombie with intangibility and X-ray vision. She powered up to be able to take one person with her when she walks through walls.
- Spike Gong (voiced by Diana Kaarina) is a three-year-old student at Pitchfork Pines Preschool who is a Dragon and is able to control and breaths clouds. He powered up to fly much like Drac.
- Vida Calavera (voiced by Gigi Saul Guerrero) is Lobo's cousin who is a Mexican Sugar Skull from Ciudad Monstruo with the ability to make plants grow.
- Olive (voiced by Elicia Mackenzie) is an Ogre who has Frankie's powers and smells like peppermint.
- Rocky (voiced by Asia Mattu) is a stone Gargoyle who often struggles with flying but can changes color based on how he's feeling.
- Sami Snow (voiced by Diana Kaarina) is a Yeti girl with snow magic.
- Zane Walker (voiced by Rukiya Bernard) is Zoe's brother who is a zombie who has his sister's powers but stronger, he also has telekinesis, and is able to phase objects he sees with the point of his finger.

=== Teachers ===
- Igor (voiced by Ian James Corlett) is a wizard-like teacher at Pitchfork Pines Preschool with Esmie.
- Esmie (voiced by Britt McKillip) is Igor's gothic granddaughter.
- Miss Mina (voiced by Nicole Anthony) is the current teacher for the new class of Super Monsters. She is also a monster herself with rainbow wings that enable her to fly, though her species of what monster she is unknown
- Glorb (voiced by Kathleen Barr) is a imp-like Hamster and the class's pet and Lobo's best friend and part-time caretaker. He powered up with a new look.

=== Monster Parents ===
- Mr. Mash Sr. (voiced by Brian Drummond) is Frankie's dad and Mrs. Mash's husband.
- Mary Mash is Frankie's mom and Mr. Mash's wife.
- Count Dracula Shadows Sr. (voiced by Edward Foy) is Drac's dad.
- Cleopatra Graves Sr. (voiced by Nicole Oliver) is Cleo's mom.
- Amy Spelling (voiced by Elishia Perosa) is Katya's mom.
- Abigail (voiced by Elicia Mackenzie) is Olive's Mom who smells like cupcakes.
- Luigi (voiced by Ian James Corlett) is Olive's Dad who smells like pizza.
- Doyle the Gargoyle (voiced by Ian James Corlett) is Rocky's uncle.
- Mrs. Snow (voiced by Elyse Maloway) is Sami's mom.

== Episodes ==
=== Series overview ===
Season	Episodes		Originally released
1	10		October 13, 2017
2	6		October 5, 2018
Special	4	2	October 5, 2018
Special	4	2	April 16, 2019
3	6		October 4, 2019
Special	2		October 4, 2019
Special	3		August 1, 2020
Special	1		June 1, 2021

=== Season 1 (2017) ===
No. overall	No. in season	Title	Animation direction by	Written by	Original release date
1	1	"Meet the Super Monsters / Vampires Don't Dance"	Barry Karnowski / Dustin McKenzie	Kaaren Lee Brown / Noelle Wright	October 13, 2017
The Super Monsters meet Zoe. / Drac gets frustrated because he has trouble learning how to dance.
2	2	"Borrowed Trouble / Spell Help"	Jimmy Tu / Jake Joice	Evan Gore & Heather Lombard / Corey Powell	October 13, 2017
Frankie takes Katya's wand without asking and trouble goes on. / A trip to the library teaches Katya to ask for help when she needs it.
3	3	"Safety Fur All / Even Super Monsters Need Manners"	Dustin McKenzie / Jimmy Tu	Kati Rocky / Brad Birch	October 13, 2017
Lobo learns to follow the rules on a class field trip to Funland. / Cleo teaches the Super Monsters manners.
4	4	"Monsters at the Museum / The Lost and the Furry One"	Jimmy Tu / Dustin McKenzie	Brad Birch / Evan Gore & Heather Lombard	October 13, 2017
The class helps Frankie talk about his feelings after a frightful trip to the museum. / A careless Lobo loses his friends' favorite things.
5	5	"Once in a Blue Moon / Zombie Eyes Surprise"	Jake Joice / Steve Sacks	Kati Rocky / Michael Ryan	October 13, 2017
Katya can't decide which punch to mix up for the Blue Moon party. / Zoe's zombie vision gets in the way when the Super Monsters learn a new game.
6	6	"Training Bristles / Team of One"	Sylvain Blais / Barry Karnowski	Robert N. Skir / Evan Gore & Heather Lombard	October 13, 2017
Katya gives up on flying after an accident on her broomstick. / Drac brags that his flying skills make him the best at everything.
7	7	"Glorb the Gobbler / Petting Zoo Hullabaloo"	Steve Sacks / Jake Joice	Noelle Wright / Kati Rocky	October 13, 2017
The Super Monsters learn there are consequences to giving Glorb too much food. / Cleo is nervous about meeting animals at the petting zoo.
8	8	"Practice Makes Perfect / Henri in Boots"	Sylvain Blais / Dustin McKenzie	Michael Ryan / Robert N. Skir	October 13, 2017
"Drac the Magnificent" doesn't think he needs to practice for his first-ever magic show. / A full moon mutates the Super Monsters into book characters.
9	9	"Oh My, Pizza Pie / Never Cry Werewolf"	Barry Karnowski / Steve Sacks	Noelle Wright / Robert N. Skir	October 13, 2017
The Super Monsters get a taste of teamwork on a field trip to a real pizzeria. / Lobo's dad comes to school to talk about his job as a firefighter.
10	10	"Tricks Before Treats / Halloween Extravaganza"	Sylvain Blais	Noelle Wright	October 13, 2017
The Super Monsters treat their neighbors to Halloween tricks they'll never forget. / The kids meet a new classmate at a neighborhood Halloween party. Note: This is the first double-part special episode.

=== Season 2 (2018) ===
No. overall	No. in season	Title	Animation direction by	Written by	Original release date
11	1	"Cleo Has the Answers / Spike the Scavenger"	Emma Milligen / Alexis Sugden	Evan Gore & Heather Lombard / Noelle Wright	October 5, 2018
It is Spike's first night of preschool, and he's got a lot a questions. / Spike brings out his competitive side during a field trip.
12	2	"Cure for the Witchy-Ups / Stage Fright Tonight"	Wade Cross / Quinn Lincoln	Corey Powell / Robert N. Skir	October 5, 2018
Katya gets the hiccups, causing her magic to go out of whack. / Frankie's dad gets stage fright at the parents-children talent show.
13	3	"The Runaway Gargoyle / Project Little Wings"	April Napady / Ben Driedger	Evan Gore & Heather Lombard / Corey Powell	October 5, 2018
The Super Monsters accidentally hurt Doyle the Gargoyle's feelings. / Drac and Katya help Spike learn how to fly.
14	4	"Superpowers Swap / Monster-preciation Night"	Chris Pearson / Jimmy Tu	Robert N. Skir / Noelle Wright	October 5, 2018
The Super Monsters wish that they could have one another's superpowers—and that actually came true. Cleo has Drac's mad flying skills, Drac has Katya's magic, Frankie has Lobo's super speed, Zoe has Frankie's stomp, Spike has Zoe's Zombie-vision, Lobo has Cleo's wind, and Katya has Spike's roar. / The monsters create a surprise for Igor and Esmie.
15	5	"No Moon, No Matter / Misadventures in Monster-Sitting"	Alexis Sugden / Dustin McKenzie	Robert N. Skir / Corey Powell	October 5, 2018
The Super Monsters use books—and their imaginations—to create their own magic. / Igor and Esmie agree to watch a baby monster.
16	6	"Grrbus, the School Bus / The Night Nibbler"	Quinn Lincoln / Wade Cross	Evan Gore & Heather Lombard / Noelle Wright	October 5, 2018
The kids wash their sticky school bus, and they're in for a surprise. / The monsters solve a mystery in the garden.

=== Specials (2018-2019) ===
No. overall	No. in season	Title	Animation direction by	Written by	Original release date
17	S1	"Super Monsters Save Halloween"	Emma Milligen & Daniel Rojas	Kaaren Lee Brown (Part 1), Evan Gore & Heather Lombard (Part 2)	October 5, 2018
The Super Monsters use their powers to get their neighbors in the Halloween spirit, then help a nervous friend see there is nothing to be afraid of.
18	S2	"Super Monsters and The Wish Star"	April Napady & Ben Driedger	Evan Gore & Heather Lombard (Part 1), Robert N. Skir (Part 2)	December 7, 2018
Christmas wishes come true for Lobo, whose favorite cousin arrives for a surprise visit, and for Glorb, who wishes he could be everywhere at once.
19	S3	"Super Monsters: Furever Friends"	Jimmy Tu & Emma Milligen (Parts 1 & 2), Daniel Rojas & Dustin McKenzie (Parts 3 & 4), Alexis Sugden & Wade Cross (Parts 5 & 6)	Kaaren Lee Brown	April 16, 2019
On the first night of spring, the Super Monsters gather for food, fun and games in the park, and also meet their adorable new pets.
20	S4	"Super Monsters Back to School"	Quinn Lincoln & Daniel Rojas	Corey Powell	August 16, 2019
The Super Monsters welcome Vida to her new home in Pitchfork Pines with a tour of their favorite places, then help her through her first day at school.

=== Season 3 (2019) ===
No. overall	No. in season	Title	Animation direction by	Written by	Original release date
21	1	"Moonlight Melody / The Impossible Seed"	Dustin McKenzie / Jimmy Tu	Robert N. Skir / Latoya Raveneau	October 4, 2019
When Lobo tries to sing, the Blue Moon makes him howl. / Vida's plant powers are strong, But her friends want to help tend the night garden, too.
22	2	"Monster Heart-Friend Night"	April Napady & Emma Milligen	Kaaren Lee Brown (Part 1), Kerry Glover (Part 2)	October 4, 2019
A magical Dragon Moon helps the Super Monsters send cards to the special people in their lives on Monster Heart-Friend Night. Note: This is the second double-part special episode.
23	3	"Lost Among the Pines / A Mermaid in Pitchfork Pines"	Mitchel Kennedy / Dustin McKenzie	Bernie Ancheta / Corey Powell	October 4, 2019
The Super Monsters lose each other while picking moon berries in the woods with Ranger Ben. / On an outing at Crystal Lake, Drac meets a mermaid who longs to fly.
24	4	"Putting on a Show"	Jimmy Tu & Emma Milligen	Robert N. Skir	October 4, 2019
Katya has strong feelings about the "right" way to put on a play, but the Super Monsters are full of creative ideas.
25	5	"Green With Envy / Oops, We Shrunk the Cars"	Mitchel Kennedy / Kevin Worth	Latoya Raveneau / Bernie Ancheta	October 4, 2019
Zoe gets jealous when her baby brother, Zane, can do things she can't. / At the Super Monsters' car wash, enchanted sponges shrink all the vehicles.
26	6	"An Ogre in Pitchfork Pines"	Jimmy Tu & Mitchel Kennedy	Kaaren Lee Brown	October 4, 2019
Luigi becomes very upset when he hears the Super Monsters making fun of the ways Ogres look (and smell), so he helps his young friends understand why making fun of other people (and monsters) is hurtful, only to reveal that he has a wedding.

=== Specials (2019) ===
No. overall	No. in season	Title	Animation direction by	Written by	Original release date
27	S5	"Super Monsters: Vida's First Halloween"	Ben Driedger & Emma Milligen	Bernie Ancheta	October 4, 2019
The Super Monsters share their Halloween traditions with Vida, Elham get invited to a Día de los Muertos party in the Howlers' backyard.
28	S6	"Super Monsters Save Christmas"	Jimmy Tu & Mitchel Kennedy	M.J. Offen & Kaaren Lee Brown	November 26, 2019
It is Christmas Eve in Pitchfork Pines, and the Super Monsters are joining forces to deck the halls, find Santa's missing reindeer and save the holidays.

=== Specials (2020) ===
No. overall	No. in season	Title	Animation direction by	Written by	Original release date
29	S7	"Super Monsters: The New Class"	Mitchel Kennedy & Quinn Lincoln	Noelle Wright	August 1, 2020
A new class of pint-sized preschoolers arrives at Pitchfork Pines, and the Super Monsters take their superpowers to the next level — the Purple Room.
30	S8	"Super Monsters: Dia De Los Monsters"	Alexis Sugden, Andrew Hudec & Mitchel Kennedy	Bernie Ancheta	September 25, 2020
The Super Monsters celebrate Día de los Muertos in Vida's hometown with her magical family, some new monster friends and a spook-tacular parade.
31	S9	"Super Monsters: Santa's Super Monster Helpers"	Chris Pearson & Affy LaFond	Kaaren Lee Brown	December 8, 2020
When Santa needs serious help prepping all of his presents, the Super Monsters lend a hand — and some monster magic — to get every gift out on time.

=== Specials (2021) ===
No. overall	No. in season	Title	Animation direction by	Written by	Original release date
32	S10	"Super Monsters: Once Upon a Rhyme"	Daniel Rojas & Chris Pearson	Robert N. Skir	June 1, 2021
From Goldilocks to Hansel and Gretel, the Super Monsters reimagine classic fairy tales and favorite nursery rhymes with a musical, magical spin.

== Other Super Monsters Shows and spin-offs ==
=== Super Monsters Monster Party ===
Super Monsters Monster Party was released on Netflix and Disney Junior (Canada and Singapore) on September 14, 2018, consisting of four episodes.

=== Super Monsters Monster Pets ===
Super Monsters Monster Pets was released on Netflix on June 7, 2019, consisting of five episodes.
