= Vincent Tong (voice actor) =

Canadian voice actor

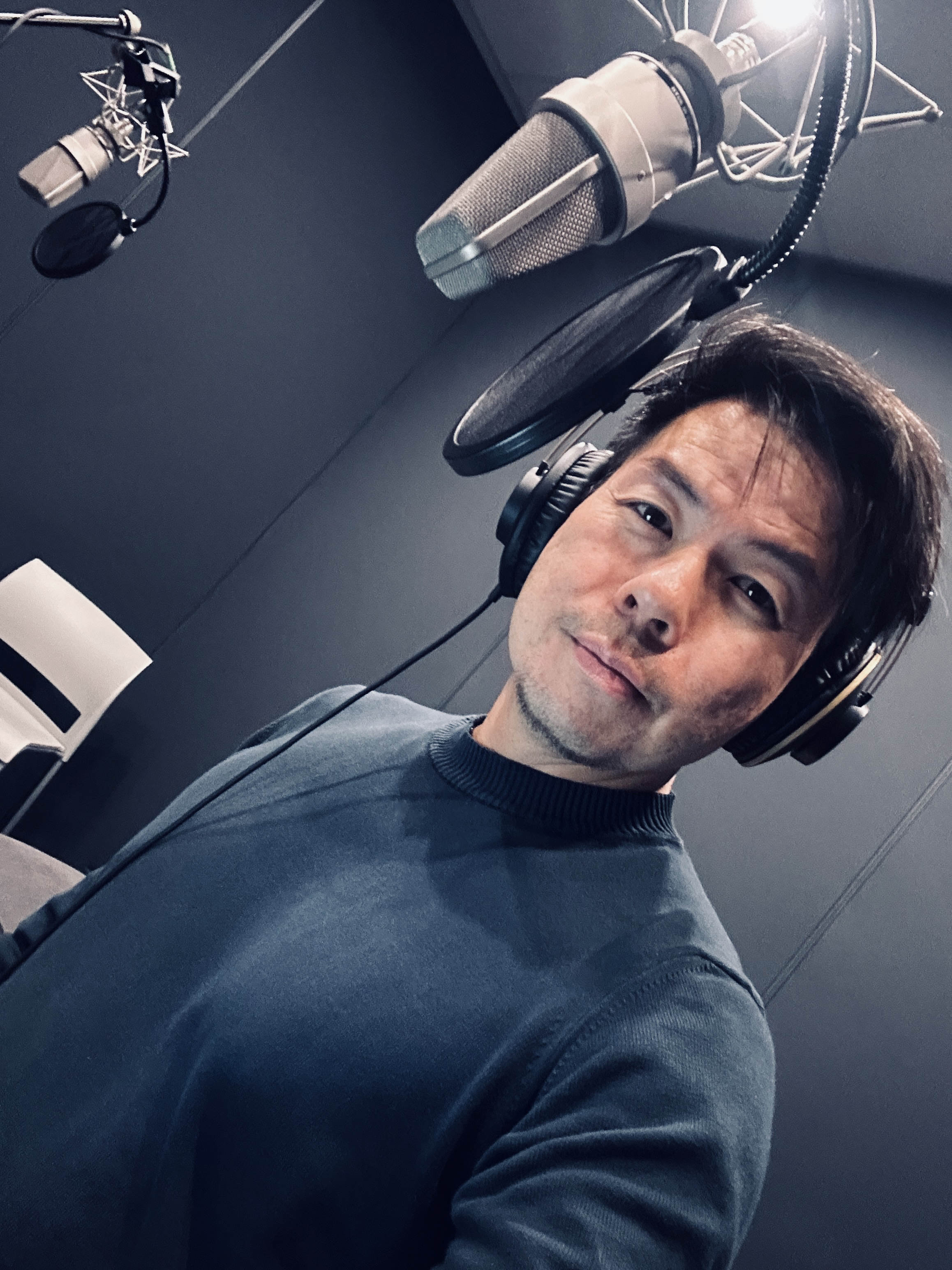
- Tong in recording studio, 2026
- Occupation: Voice actor
- Years active: 2002–present

Vincent Tong is a Canadian voice actor. His voice roles include Gene Khan / The Mandarin in Iron Man: Armored Adventures, Toro in Sushi Pack, Henry in Kid vs. Kat, Garble, Flash Sentry, and Sandbar in My Little Pony: Friendship Is Magic, Daniel in Voltron Force, Kai in Ninjago, Antaeus "Ant" Nekton in The Deep as well as Jestro in Nexo Knights and Eugene Wong in the Peacock DreamWorks animated series Dragons: The Nine Realms. He also voiced Euden in Dragalia Lost before being replaced by Victor Hunter.

== Filmography ==
=== Anime ===
- Beyblade Burst – Ukyo Ibuki
- Death Note – Touta Matsuda, Field Reporter
- Gin Tama – Sogo Okita
- Hello Carbot – Blaster
- Nana – Kinoshita
- Slam Dunk – Tetsushi Shiozaki
- The Story of Saiunkoku – Yushun Tei (Jun Yu), Guard #2

=== Non-Anime ===
Animation

- 16 Hudson – Sam, Mr. Wu, MC
- The Bad Guys: The Series – Skulli Flame-Boni
- Bob the Builder – Muck (US), Brandon (US)
- Chip and Potato – Mr. Badger-Fox, Mr. Buffalo, Pa Fant, Roy Razzle, Ray Razzle
- Chuck's Choice – Joey Adonis, School Cameraman
- Corner Gas Animated – Various voices
- The Deep – Antaeaus "Ant" Nekton, various voices
- Dinosaur Train – Yuan
- Dinotrux – Chunk, Navs, Washout, additional voices
- The Dragon Prince – Prince Kasef
- Dragons: The Nine Realms – Eugene Wong
- Exchange Student Zero – John, Nephlan 1, Sensei
- Gigantosaurus – Giganto, Trey
- Hero: 108 – Yan Ching
- Iron Man: Armored Adventures – Gene Khan / The Mandarin
- Johnny Test – Jorf Muskerberg, Cheesy Singer
- Kaeloo – Kaeloo, Quack Quack (English dub)
- Kid vs. Kat – Henry
- Kong: King of the Apes – Danny Quon, various voices
- The Last Kids on Earth – Schnozz
- Lego Elves – Tidus Stormsurfer
- Lego Jurassic World: Legend of Isla Nublar – Dr. Henry Wu, various voices
- Lego Jurassic World: The Secret Exhibit – Dr. Henry Wu, additional voices
- Littlest Pet Shop: A World of Our Own – Mister Yut, various voices
- Llama Llama – Officer Flamingo, Daddy Gnu
- LoliRock – Mephisto
- Mack & Moxy – Blump, Little Bird
- Max Steel – Vendor, Commander Parker
- Mega Man: Fully Charged – Aki Light / Mega Man, Namagem
- Mighty Mighty Monsters – Frankie
- My Little Pony: Friendship Is Magic – Prince Blueblood, Garble, Flash Sentry, Sandbar, Feather Bangs, additional voices
- My Adventures with Superman - Steve Lombard, Rough House
- Nerds and Monsters – Irwin Chang-Stein, additional voices
- Nexo Knights – Jestro, Jousting Bieber, Roberto Arnoldi, Roger the Scrubber
- Ninjago – Kai, additional voices
- Ninjago: Dragons Rising – Kai, additional voices
- Pac-Man and the Ghostly Adventures – Master Goo
- Packages from Planet X – Dan Zembrowsky
- Polly Pocket – Nicholas, Mayor Kisser, Neil, Eduardo
- Slugterra – Bartholomew, Quentin's Cell Guard
- Sonic Prime – Renegade Knucks, Gnarly Knuckles, Knuckles the Dread, Dr. Deep, Dr. Don't, Dr. Babble
- StarBeam – Cosmic Crusher, Snowfoot
- Storm Hawks – Raptor Guard
- Strawberry Shortcake: Berry in the Big City – Huckleberry Pie
- Superbook – Aaron (2)
- Super Dinosaur – KAL / Erupticus
- Super Monsters – Drac, Mr. Gabmore, Mandarin Teacher, Henri in Boots, Luigi, Werewolf Kid, Party Guest #3
- Sushi Pack – Toro
- Tom and Jerry Tales – Alien Mouse #1, Bearded Man
- Voltron Force – Daniel, Pedicab Robot, Comms Officer

=== Film ===
- Bob the Builder: Mega Machines – Muck (US)
- Barbie: A Fashion Fairytale – Hotdogeteria Guy
- Barbie: Princess Charm School – Prince Nicholas, Guard #2
- Diary of a Wimpy Kid: Rodrick Rules - Leland
- Ghost Patrol – Marco Flores, Texan
- The Ice Age Adventures of Buck Wild – Crash
- Ice Age: Boiling Point - Crash
- The Last Whale Singer – Vincent
- L.O.R.D: Legend of Ravaging Dynasties – Silver
- My Little Pony: Equestria Girls – Flash Sentry
- My Little Pony: Equestria Girls – Friendship Games – Flash Sentry, Bus Driver
- My Little Pony: Equestria Girls – Holidays Unwrapped – Flash Sentry
- My Little Pony: Equestria Girls – Legend of Everfree – Flash Sentry, Sandalwood
- My Little Pony: Equestria Girls – Rainbow Rocks – Flash Sentry, Brawly Beats
- Ratchet & Clank – Brax Lectrus, Solana Trooper
- Sausage Party – Pislitz Chips, Juicebox, Jamaican Rum
- Slugterra: Return of the Elementals – Junjie
- Super Monsters Furever Friends – Drac, Luigi, Mr. Gabmore
- They Wait – Young Xiang

=== Video games ===
- Avatar: The Last Airbender - Quest for Balance – Zuko, Haru, additional voices
- Avatar Legends: The Fighting Game - Zuko
- Dispatch - Dopple, Green Ski, News Anchor, Various
- Dragalia Lost – Euden, Aurien, Luther
- Nickelodeon Kart Racers 3: Slime Speedway – Zuko
- Nicktoons & The Dice of Destiny - Zuko
- Prototype 2 – Additional Voices
- Puzzle Fighter – Ryu, Ken Masters
- Rogue Company – Diego "Chaac" Hernandez
- Shank 2 - Shank

=== Live action English dubbing ===
- Avatar: The Last Airbender - Lau Wong
- Death Note – Touta Matsuda
- Death Note 2: The Last Name – Touta Matsuda

== Crew work ==
- Shank 2 - Voice director
