= The Hollow (TV series) =

TV series on Netflix

- Season 1 promotional poster
- Genre: Mystery; Adventure; Science fantasy; Dramedy; Superhero
- Created by: Josh Mepham; Kathy Antonsen Rocchio; Greg Sullivan; Vito Viscomi
- Directed by: Josh Mepham; Greg Sullivan
- Voices of: Ashleigh Ball; Mark Hildreth; Connor Parnall; Adrian Petriw
- Composers: Steve D'Angelo; Lorenzo Castelli
- Country of origin: Canada
- Original language: English
- No. of seasons: 2
- No. of episodes: 20

Production
- Executive producers: Josh Mepham; Kathy Antonsen Rocchio; Greg Sullivan; Vito Viscomi
- Producers: Jeff Holloway (S1); Chris Bevacqua (S1); Lesley Crawford (S2)
- Production company: Slap Happy Cartoons

Original release
- Network: Netflix
- Release: June 8, 2018 – May 8, 2020

The Hollow is a Canadian animated adventure mystery television series created by Vito Viscomi. The series premiered on Netflix on June 8, 2018. Its second season aired on May 8, 2020. On August 31, 2020, the series was cancelled.

== Plot ==
=== Season 1 ===
Adam, Mira, and Kai are three teenagers who awaken in a room with no memories of themselves or each other; the only clue to their identities are their names written on small slips of paper in their pockets. After emerging from an underground bunker, they find themselves in a deep forest and venture forth to discover who they are and how to get home.

Along the way, they encounter a strange character that they call "Weirdie," or "the Weird Guy," who teleports them to different regions whenever they ask "help, please." Each region, however, harbors dangers and obstacles that the group struggle to overcome, while also discovering that they each possess superpowers; Adam has both super strength and agility, Mira can communicate with animals, breathe underwater, and swim like a mermaid, and Kai can cast and manipulate fire, as well as being a technical savant.

The trio encounters a large, talking tree who offers to send them home if they can retrieve a stolen branch of hers that has been turned into a dangerous weapon called the Ishibo. While attempting to retrieve it, they also encounter another trio of teens: Vanessa, Reeve and Skeet; each with their own superpowers who compete with them for possession of the Ishibo.

Regardless of the trials and setbacks that follow, the trio emerges victorious over their rivals and claim the Ishibo. However, Adam's theory that they are in a virtual reality game is confirmed by Weirdie who warns them that the glitches they have seen are a sign that the game's code is corrupted and is on the verge of crashing, and that they must quickly escape the game.

After returning the Ishibo to the Iron Tree, she enables them to enter a region where they must fight a dragon. After the dragon's defeat, they enter a portal in the building the dragon was guarding. Once through the portal, they wind up in the same room they started in, except for the fact that there was a green button. They press it, and exit the game, waking up in a VR tournament (filmed as live-action) where they are greeted by the Weirdie (revealed to be the show's host) and cheered by the live audience for winning the game, "The Hollow." However, as the rival team wakes up, Kai notices Vanessa's eye slightly glitching.

=== Season 2 ===
Adam, Kai and Mira wake up in a place that is visually identical to their homes, but they still believe they are in the Hollow. While exploring this world, they individually find that no one has ever heard of the Hollow. When they first meet, Adam is running away from his childhood bullies, who have remained the same age. They realize that all of their greatest fears, the bullies for Adam, a giant chicken for Kai, and a Victorian-era doll for Mira, have been manifested into the real world. While fighting these fears, they realize that they still have their powers from the Hollow. Adam and Mira agree that they should go to Hollow Games Headquarters, the headquarters of the company that created the Hollow game and tournament, the next day. While Mira is on her way home, she sees Skeet, and decides to go to Hollow Games Headquarters without Adam and Kai. When Adam and Kai meet to go, Mira doesn't come, so they leave for the headquarters, suspecting that she's there. While they're there, they find a portal, like the ones that appear in the Hollow game, and jump into it.

Once they go through the portal, they arrive on an island of primitive parrot people, where they find Skeet. They then go to a nuclear power plant and see another team of teens with powers. One of the members of this team is shot and killed, so the Weird Guy appears in order to remove the team from the game. When Adam, Kai, and Skeet see the Weird Guy, they attempt to get his attention, but aren't able to. While escaping from the power plant, they go through a portal with Mira. Together, they fight a giant snail, but it kills Skeet and they are unable to revive him. The owner of the snail, a scientist, invites them to stay with him. While there, they find Reeve and Vanessa, who are seemingly under mind control. They defeat the scientist, releasing Reeve and Vanessa from his control. After leaving the scientist's manor, they find a poster, which features the Weird Guy, and decide to go find him, in order to get answers. On their way, they run into the other team from this game, who have their equivalent of the Ishibo, and battle them. When they find the Weird Guy, he thinks that they are "coding errors," so he uses a portal to send them elsewhere.

The crew attempt to find the Weird Guy to get his help, and they convince him that they're real by using his real name, Gustaf. He reveals that the crew are digital copies of their physical selves consciousnesses, taken by the Hollow Game Company for a new game, Hollow Life, that lets players experience an environment populated by NPC versions of past winners of the Hollow. They convince the Weird Guy to disconnect the Hollow Life server from the Hollow game so they can live there in peace. He tells them that while he is doing it, they must not let the game's other team leave the game, by winning or losing.

Vanessa reveals to everyone that she cheated in the tournament by using special contact lens to retain her memories to have a better shot at winning the game, which caused the glitch and made their copied consciousnesses self-aware. She is kicked out of the group by Adam, Mira, and Reeve. She sees that the other team is moving on to the final part of the game, and she follows them. Adam, Kai, Mira, and Reeve go to the final level and start battling the other team. Vanessa rejoins the group and, at the same time the other team wins, the Weird Guy tells them he's finished and opens a portal. They make it through. The final scenes of the season are Adam, Kai, Mira, Reeve, and Vanessa having a barbecue at Mira's home, followed by a shot of the snail from the Hollow game in the Hollow Life world.

== Voice cast ==
- Adrian Petriw as Adam, who is clever, incredibly strong, and agile, and assumes the role of leader of the group. In Season 2, he is revealed to be gay. He is one of the main protagonists.
  - Peter Bundic plays Adam in the live-action scenes.
- Ashleigh Ball as Mira, who is good at puzzles and is able to communicate with animals and creatures, breathe underwater, and swim at great speeds. She is one of the main protagonists. She has two dads, Curtis and Paul, in the Hollow, and one brother, Miles, in the same reality.
  - Lana Jalissa plays Mira in the live-action scenes.
- Connor Parnall as Kai, who is smart and nerdy, being a tech whiz, and chose the ability to create and manipulate fire. However, he's impulsive, not very athletic, and often makes jokes that only he finds funny. In Season 2, it's revealed that he's a friend of Mira's brother Miles, extremely rich and was initially only chosen for the team to replace Reeve when he left it. He is one of the main protagonists.
  - Harrison Houde plays Kai in the live-action scenes,
- Diana Kaarina as Vanessa. Along with being able to fly, she is incredibly manipulative and scheming. It is revealed that she cheated by having digiblock lenses placed in her eyes to keep her memory from being blocked and thus secretly caused the "glitch". She is one of the main antagonists in Season 1, but later one of the main protagonists in Season 2.
  - Destiny Millens plays Vanessa in the live-action scenes.
- Alex Barima as Reeve, a boy who can move things with his mind. He is shown to be the most malicious of his group. It was revealed in Season 2 that Adam and Reeve used to be friends, but that Reeve joined Vanessa's team after a fight. Later he becomes friends with Adam again. He is one of the main antagonists in Season 1, but later one of the main protagonists in Season 2. Furthermore, it's suggested in Season 2 that Reeve may also be gay.
  - Abdoul Diallo plays Reeve in the live-action scenes
- Jesse Moss as Skeet, who can run at super speed. He is the least malicious of his group and at some point tries to convince his teammates to work together with their competitors after he is made aware of the dangers represented by the glitches. In Season 2, it is revealed that his real name is Bernard and that he has been a friend to Mira since preschool. His character is killed in the fourth episode of Season 2. He is one of the main antagonists in Season 1, but later one of the main protagonists in Season 2.
  - Chase Dallas Carey plays Skeet in the live-action scenes.
- Kazumi Evans as Nisha, one of the new main antagonists in Season 2. She has the ability to use fire just like Kai.
- Sam Vincent as Tyler, one of the new main antagonists in Season 2. He has the ability to manipulate the weather. He also plays Jules Voulcan, an evil French scientist.
- Khamisa Wilsher as Iris, one of the new main antagonists in Season 2. She has the ability to increase her size for a short time.
- Mark Hildreth as The Weird Guy or Weirdy or Gustaf (Real Life), an eccentric and mysterious individual who appears whenever someone says the phrase "help please". Outside the game he is the host.
  - Hildreth also plays The Weird Guy in the live-action scenes.
- Nicole Oliver as Tree/Spider-Woman.
- Ian James Corlett as Benjamin. Along with Benjamini, he is a strongman for a rundown carnival in Season 1 and a waiter for the jazz club in Season 2.
- Michael Daingerfield as Benjamini. Along with Benjamin, he is a strongman for a rundown carnival in Season 1 and a waiter for the jazz club in Season 2.
- Brian Drummond as Death, one of the Four Horsemen of the Apocalypse. He is apparently skilled in baking scones and brewing iced tea. In Season 2, he works at the bar.
- Nicole Oliver as Brynhilda, a Viking woman.
- Kathleen Barr as The Witches.
- Akuma, a Japanese demon monk king who stole the Ishibo. In Season 2 he is the host in a game called "Pick a Portal".
- Brian Dobson as Toros/Minotaur #1.
- Paul Dobson as Minotaur #2.
- Lee Tockar as Dave.
- Peter Kelamis as Spider-Leader
- Jason Simpson as Cyclops.

== Production ==
=== LGBTQ representation ===
This short-lived series, The Hollow, featured various LGBTQ+ characters. On May 8, 2020, the show's second season premiered on Netflix. The first episode of that season, titled "Home", features one of the show's protagonists, an Asian girl named Mira, was shown to be adopted by her two fathers named Paul and Curtis and a brother named Miles. The second episode featured a Hispanic boy named Adam who was revealed to be gay, as he said that Mira, a female protagonist, is "not his type". Prior to this, in the trailer for Season 2 the LGBT pride flag was seen in his room, leading some fans to speculate he was gay. (This flag is also seen right at the beginning of the first episode of Season Two). Also, the unfolding of the events in the series makes it very likely that Reeve might be gay and a former love interest of Adam. Some critics stated that while this was somewhat clear in season one, there is little or no "romantic entanglement" for the show's characters in the show's second season, with the show focusing on "difficult and dramatic friendships" instead.

== Episodes ==
=== Series overview ===
Season	Episodes	Originally released
1	10	June 8, 2018
2	10	May 8, 2020

=== Season 1 (2018) ===
No. overall	No. in season	Title	Directed by	Written by	Original release date
1	1	"The Room"	Josh Mepham	Vito Viscomi	June 8, 2018
Adam, Kai and Mira wake up in a room with amnesia. Nearby, there are slips of paper with their names on them and a typewriter. They use the typewriter to type "help", which causes bricks to move forward and act as ledges leading to a vent. As the room begins filling up with green smoke, they reach the vent, eventually winding up at an exit that leads to a forest. Mira discovers that she can translate an owl's hoots. After escaping the underground bunker, the trio walks through the forest, ending up at an electrified fence. They search for a switch to deactivate it and find an abandoned cabin. Inside, there are science equipment, a satchel they take, and three torn apart cages. They then encounter three "Devil Dogs" that begin to chase them. Running towards the fence, they see the switch and use keys from the satchel to make their escape. They are then trapped at the edge of a cliff with the creatures digging their way under the fence. The three meet someone whom they call the "Weird Guy". After they ask for help with a "please", he creates a portal in which they fall through. On the other side, before passing out, Adam sees two figures speaking in a foreign language while looking down at the trio.
2	2	"The Desert"	Greg Sullivan	Vito Viscomi	June 8, 2018
The trio wake up in a town of anthropomorphic bulls. Mira attempts to talk to them, being able to understand them, but they call her a witch. They are tied in a large chamber belonging to a giant bull named Toros. They eventually escape and head down the tunnels under the chamber. Seeing a light at the end of the tunnel, against Kai's warnings and cautiousness, they introduce themselves to an overly cheery woman they meet at the end. She offers them food, but after a mention of not trusting her, she transforms into a soul-eating witch. The trio knock her out but another witch comes along, and attacks them. After fighting off a third witch, they trek through the desert, and become dehydrated and tired. Eventually three figures on horses come and pick them up.
3	3	"Apocalypse"	Josh Mepham	Vito Viscomi	June 8, 2018
The three figures bring the trio to a ship crash site. Adam identifies them as the Four Horsemen of the Apocalypse; Plague, Famine, War, and Death. They find out that Death's horse is really sick, and after being fed, Mira is able to understand the horse. To heal him, they call for the Weird Guy and he teleports Mira back to the lab in the forest to get medicine. She narrowly escapes the Devil Dogs, and comes back with a vial. Meanwhile, Kai is able to fix up a ship and gets it to work. After healing Death's horse, they take off in the ship. After making it above the water, Adam accidentally kicks something and the ship begins plummeting into the water. They eject their seats, but Mira's seat belt is stuck. She continues to sink down as she loses consciousness. Adam and Kai are unable to swim far enough, and are forced to go to the surface. Kai blames Adam and angrily leaves. At the end of the episode, Mira is seen lodged against a rock, opening her eyes.
4	4	"The Lighthouse"	Greg Sullivan	Vito Viscomi	June 8, 2018
Adam theorizes that they are in a parallel universe. He also learns more about his strength when he accidentally pushes Kai. During their argument, Mira arrives. She explains that she is able to breathe underwater and can swim like a mermaid. The trio then continue walking and see a lighthouse. They then find out that it is inhabited by a cyclops. In hopes of using the lighthouse to signal for help, they must find a new light bulb as the one there is broken. With Mira's swimming skill and the help of an octopus, they are able to retrieve a new light bulb from an abandoned submarine. When they fix the lighthouse's light, they signal SOS, but only the Weird Guy shows up. Kai asks for help, despite Adam and Mira's protests. They are teleported into the sky and land on a talking tree. The tree tells them about how she lost her arm (a branch) and the trio go after the one who stole it, Akuma. Akuma had turned the arm into a powerful, dangerous weapon called the Ishibo. Upon arriving in his floating temple, the doors and windows close, locking them in and making everything go dark.
5	5	"Ishibo"	Josh Mepham	Vito Viscomi	June 8, 2018
The trio is captured by Akuma, and Adam winds up having to fight their best warrior. Adam, with incredible strength, defeats the warrior, and Akuma's minions run away in terror. Akuma, with the Ishibo, challenges Adam in a fight. Adam barely wins as Akuma drops the Ishibo and falls off the floating piece of land. Just when Adam reaches to pick up the Ishibo, three other super-powered teens appear. They take the Ishibo and leave using their superpowers: either speed, flight, or telekinesis. After the strange teens' departure, Akuma's minions come stampeding back. They call for help, and the Weird Guy teleports them to a spaceship. They soon find out that the ship was taken over by an alien, but also has a teleporter they could use. They teleport themselves and appear in a run-down theme park inhabited by Benjamin and Benjamini, who love having fun. Kai fixes one of their rides, and tries it out with Benjamini, while Adam and Mira learn that the three other kids also came by the theme park. The ride then catches on fire, and begins collapsing.
6	6	"Undead"	Greg Sullivan	Vito Viscomi	June 8, 2018
The friends wander in a spooky town and they are not alone. Can they trust their new acquaintances?
7	7	"The Riddle"	Josh Mepham	Vito Viscomi	June 8, 2018
Separated from Kai and the others, Mira and Adam found an old man underground and must solve his riddle. While Adam spotted a clue on what's going on.
8	8	"Ice"	Greg Sullivan	Vito Viscomi	June 8, 2018
After battling an ice monster, Adam, Kai and Mira weigh their choice to help the other kids. But they end up betraying them while being stranded on the island. Then end up in the middle of the sea.
9	9	"Cocoon"	Josh Mepham	Vito Viscomi	June 8, 2018
The friends land on an island full of mutant spider humans. Adam is not waking up from him being cold and weak and needs help. And time is running out.
10	10	"Colrath"	Greg Sullivan	Vito Viscomi	June 8, 2018
Adam, Mira and Kai find and dodge their old enemies in order to get the Ishibo and return it to the tree. And discover that a powerful foe is right next to their destination.

=== Season 2 (2020) ===
No. overall	No. in season	Title	Directed by	Written by	Original release date
11	1	"Home"	Greg Sullivan	Whitney Ralls	May 8, 2020
After discovering the truth behind the Hollow, friends Adam, Mira and Kai awaken in their real-life world, but something's not right.
12	2	"Hollow Games"	Josh Mepham	Laura Sreebny	May 8, 2020
The friends team up to face their biggest fears, but they still need answers — and Mira decides to take matters into her own hands.
13	3	"The Return"	Greg Sullivan	Steve Sullivan	May 8, 2020
Adam and Kai land in a new version of the Hollow and search for Mira in a creepy castle where a gnome's riddle gives them a clue.
14	4	"Puzzled"	Josh Mepham	Hillary Benefiel	May 8, 2020
In a strange world filled with shifting shapes, the friends face a puzzling villain, then test their luck on a high-stakes game show.
15	5	"Alchemy"	Greg Sullivan	Al Schwartz	May 8, 2020
Adam, Mira, and Kai deal with a difficult loss, but their search for answers continues. At a scientist's chateau, they tangle with some old rivals.
16	6	"Dead End"	Josh Mepham	Laura Sreebny	May 8, 2020
On the hunt for Weirdy, the friends take a ghost train to a jazz club, but Adam and Reeve's arguing threatens their mission.
17	7	"Unbalanced"	Greg Sullivan	Whitney Ralls	May 8, 2020
The tension between Reeve and Adam reaches a tipping point, sending them plunging into the ocean — where a hungry sea monster awaits.
18	8	"Fang"	Josh Mepham	Steve Sullivan	May 8, 2020
After battling the sea monster with Brynhilda, the friends arrive in a fairy-tale land where three pixies lead them to Weirdy.
19	9	"Fire"	Greg Sullivan	Whitney Ralls	May 8, 2020
Vanessa's confession upsets her friends. Determined to make it up to them, she sneaks off on her own to find the other team.
20	10	"Race"	Josh Mepham	Laura Sreebny	May 8, 2020
It's a race to the finish as the friends try to outrun Team B. And when the final boss strikes, they'll have to work together to win.

== Reception ==
Reception to the show was positive. Joyce Slaton of Common Sense Media describes it as akin to Lost for tweens, but scary for younger kids, with intense and pulsing music, and calls the series "appealingly weird," saying that parents who appreciate the "dark and puzzling" may enjoy the series. Imaobong Ifum of Collider argued that the show is otherworldly, all-around weird, with "daring demonstrations of bravery, strong will, and teamwork," and said that the show embodies the same "sense of adventure and genuine communion" as Gravity Falls. Dave Trumbore, also of Collider, described the series as underrated, calling it action-packed, akin to The Maze Runner and argued that the show's second season focuses on "difficult and dramatic friendships" and called it a "cautionary tale about Big Data." Rafael Motamayor of Bloody Disgusting also made the comparison to The Maze Runner, and noted similarities with Gravity Falls, and said that while he found the show's tone "a bit childish," and said it sets up a "mystery that actually pays off without any cliffhanger." Remus Noronha of MEAWW said the show has a plot twist in the show's second season in the style of 'Devs' or 'Westworld', and was praised by fans for its LGBTQ representation, "including the reveal that Adam is gay."
