= Barbie: Princess Charm School =

- DVD cover
- Directed by: Zeke Norton
- Written by: Elise Allen
- Story by: Kati Rocky
- Produced by: Shelley Tabbut
- Starring: Diana Kaarina; Morwenna Banks; Nicole Oliver; Brittney Wilson
- Edited by: Jordan Hemsley
- Music by: BC Smith
- Production companies: Rainmaker Entertainment; Barbie Entertainment
- Distributed by: Universal Studios Home Entertainment
- Release dates: March 15, 2011 (United Kingdom); September 13, 2011 (United States)
- Running time: 80 minutes
- Countries: United States; Canada
- Language: English

Barbie: Princess Charm School is a 2011 CGI-animated fantasy film directed by Zeke Norton, written by Elise Allen, and produced by Mattel Entertainment (under the name of Barbie Entertainment) with Rainmaker Entertainment. It was released on DVD on September 13, 2011, and made its television debut on Nickelodeon two months later.

The twentieth installment in the Barbie film series, the plot follows Blair Willows, a teenage girl living in the kingdom of Gardania, who wins an annual lottery to attend a prestigious school where girls can train to become princesses or royal ladies. As Blair learns the ways of being a proper princess, she uncovers the mystery and secrets behind the kingdom's missing heiress to the throne.

== Plot ==
In the kingdom of Gardania, teenage Blair Willows works as a waitress at a small café to support her adoptive mother and younger sister, Emily. Returning home, Blair is shocked to find out via a televised broadcast that she has won a lottery for a scholarship to become a Lady Royal—a princess's advisor—at the prestigious Princess Charm School, a magical academy where princesses from different kingdoms are educated. Emily reveals that she signed up Blair for the lottery multiple times to ensure her selection. Despite Blair's reluctance, her mother assures her that attending the school is a good opportunity.

A carriage comes and takes Blair to the school, where she is enthusiastically greeted by a golden retriever named Prince. Blair meets Headmistress Alexandra Privet, who tells her that every student is assigned a fairy to act as their personal assistant. Blair's fairy, Grace, takes her to her dorm, where she meets her roommates: Princess Isla, who mixes electronic music, and Princess Hadley, an avid sportswoman. Blair is also introduced to Dame Devin, sister-in-law of the late Queen Isabella, sister of the late King Reginald, and Devin's daughter, Delancy, who will be crowned princess and ruler of Gardania at the school's graduation ceremony. Blair struggles in her classes due to her clumsiness and is further hampered by Dame Devin and Delancy, who take a strong disliking to Blair and make several attempts to sabotage her. Blair perseveres and improves when she receives special tutoring from Headmistress Privet.

While exploring the palace, Blair and her roommates happen upon a portrait of a young Queen Isabella and note her striking resemblance to Blair. Upon seeing another portrait depicting the late royal family (including Prince as a puppy) and learning that Blair was found on her doorstep by her adoptive mother on the same day the royal family died in a car crash, Isla and Hadley deduce that Blair is Queen Isabella and King Reginald's long-lost daughter, Princess Sophia, and the true heir to the throne. This discovery is overheard by Delancy, who is left disturbed. At dinner, Dame Devin announces her plan to demolish the poorer neighborhoods where Blair's family lives and replace them with new parks. However, she attributes this plan to Delancy, who appears conflicted.

Blair almost decides to return home, but changes her mind and becomes determined to find the legendary crown of Gardania, which is said to glow when worn by the rightful heir. On the night before graduation, Dame Devin plants jewelry in Blair's room and accuses her and her roommates of stealing. The three of them are then ordered detained, but are saved by Delancy, who does not want to usurp the throne from the true heir. Blair, her roommates, and Grace sneak into the palace vault, but are caught by Dame Devin, who takes the crown and locks the girls inside.

The next morning at the graduation ceremony, Delancy attempts to stall her coronation, giving Isla enough time to deduce the vault code, allowing the girls to escape. Just as Delancy is about to be crowned, Blair arrives at the coronation and makes a claim to the throne; she, her friends, and Dame Devin struggle to grab the crown, which eventually falls into Delancy's hands. To her mother's dismay, Delancy places the crown on Blair's head. The crown glows and magically dresses Blair in a new gown, confirming her identity as Princess Sophia.

Dame Devin angrily berates her daughter and inadvertently reveals that she orchestrated the deaths of Queen Isabella and King Reginald so Delancy could inherit the throne. Dame Devin is arrested, and Sophia elects Delancy as her Lady Royal as thanks for her help. At a celebratory dance party that evening, Sophia is reunited with her adoptive family.

== Cast ==
- Diana Kaarina as Blair Willows / Princess Sophia, a waitress at "Cafe Gardania" who wins a scholarship to Princess Charm School. She is kind, clever, and diligent, but a little clumsy. It is later revealed that Blair was Princess Sophia, the long lost princess of Gardania, the true heir to the throne, and daughter of the late Queen Isabella and King Reginald, who was presumed to have died in a car crash alongside her family when she was just a baby, but escaped the accident and was found by Miss Willows.
- Morwenna Banks as Alexandra Privet, the headmistress of Princess Charm School. First appearing as strict, she gives Blair private lessons to help her improve and is one of the few who believed in her.
- Nicole Oliver as Dame Devin, a vindictive school teacher at Princess Charm School, Delancy's mother, sister-in-law of Queen Isabella, sister of King Reginald, and aunt of Sophia. She had been selected to act as a lady royal, but no one picked her, not even Isabella, who would become her sister-in-law. She attempts to sabotage Blair at every corner, recognizing her as Isabella and Reginald's lost daughter, Sophia, who was the rightful heir to the throne. She had also arranged the deaths of the royal family so that Delancy could be queen.
- Brittney Wilson as Delancy Devin, a student at Princess Charm School, Dame Devin's daughter, Queen Isabella and King Reginald's niece, Sophia's cousin, and the heir presumptive of Gardania. Despite her initially spiteful attitude, she chooses to do the right thing when she learns that Blair is her cousin.
- Ali Liebert as Princess Hadley, an athletic student at Princess Charm School and one of Blair's roommates and best friends. Liebert also plays Princess Portia, Delancy's airhead companion.
- Shannon Chan-Kent as Princess Isla, a music-loving Japanese student at Princess Charm School and amateur DJ, and one of Blair's best friends and roommates.
- Vincent Tong as Prince Nicholas, a prince who attends the neighboring Prince Charming Academy and one of the boyfriend and love interest of Blair.
- Madeleine Peters as Emily Willows, Blair's adoptive younger sister and Miss Willows' second adopted daughter, who signed Blair up for the Princess Charm School lottery multiple times.
- Ellen Kennedy as Miss Willows, Blair and Emily's adoptive mother on whose doorstep Blair was left as a baby after surviving the car crash that killed her birth parents.
- Bethany Brown as Lady Royal Josette, one of Blair's classmates.
- Kazumi Evans as Harmony, Isla's personal princess assistant.
- Special guest star: Miranda Ram-Nolte as Princess Miranda

== See also ==
- List of Barbie films
