= Triple Sensation =

- Genre: Reality television
- Created by: Garth Drabinsky
- Starring: Andrew Craig (host season 1); Dean Armstrong (host season 2); Cynthia Dale; Marvin Hamlisch; Adrian Noble; Sergio Trujillo
- Country of origin: Canada
- No. of seasons: 2 (total 12 episodes)

Production
- Running time: 120 minutes

Original release
- Network: CBC Television
- Release: October 7, 2007 – July 27, 2009

Triple Sensation is a reality television series produced by multi-Tony Award-winning producer Garth Drabinsky. Its first season debuted on October 7, 2007 on CBC Television, and its second season debuted on June 22, 2009.

Over $250,000 in scholarship prizes are available, with an ultimate prize of a $150,000 scholarship award to attend the theatrical training institution of the first prize winner's choice: a school such as Juilliard, Carnegie Mellon, Yale, England's Royal Academy of Dramatic Arts, or Canada's National Theatre School. Major scholarships were also available for the runners-up.

== Judges ==
"The Marquee Panel" of judges consisted of the following five people:

- The Actor: Cynthia Dale
- The Producer: Garth Drabinsky
- The Composer: Marvin Hamlisch
- The Director: Adrian Noble
- The Choreographer: Sergio Trujillo

== First Season ==
=== Auditions and Competition ===
First auditions were held across the country in late 2006, from which selected participants were invited to audition for the Marquee Panel of judges at one of three sessions, held in Toronto, Vancouver and Montreal. From each of these auditions, only four contestants (two male and two female) were invited to the Master Class stage.

The twelve finalists were:

- Joel Ballard, age 18, from Port Coquitlam, BC
- Ben Durocher, age 17, from Stittsville, ON
- Kazumi Evans, age 17, from Delta, BC
- Alexandra Frohlinger, age 18, from Winnipeg, MB
- Lexi Gale, age 16, from Toronto, ON
- Kira Guloien, age 16, from Edmonton, AB
- Jamie Hodgins, age 24, from Ottawa, ON
- Keely Hutton, age 22, from St. John's, NL
- Kyle Mac, age 19, from Edmonton, AB
- Matt McKay, age 20, from Toronto, ON
- Anwyn Musico, age 20, from Ingersoll, ON
- John-Michael Scapin, age 16, from Newmarket, ON

The twelve finalists who reached the Master Class stage were brought together in Toronto during the summer of 2007. They were given a rigorous program of instruction in the three disciplines of acting, singing and dance, as well as other teaching that supported one or more of the disciplines (for example; clowning and Alexander Technique). At the end of each week they were graded, with the results posted for all twelve to see. After three weeks, the participants with the lowest scores for each gender were eliminated.

The fourth week was devoted to workshop performances, in groups, in couples and solo. At its conclusion, four more finalists were eliminated, and two weeks later the remaining six contestants performed in front of a live audience of several hundred people at the Rose Theatre in Brampton, Ontario.

The scholarship winners were:

- First prize: John-Michael Scapin
- First runner-up: Anwyn Musico
- Second runner-up: Keely Hutton

=== Master Classes ===
Several theatre professionals were involved in teaching the Triple Sensation Master Classes, headlined by guest lecturers Chita Rivera and Joel Grey. Among the faculty were:

- Joe Flaherty, a member of SCTV
- Andrew Wade, formerly head of voice at England's Royal Shakespeare Company
- Marlena Malas and Deborah Lapidus, both teachers at the Juilliard School,
- Michael Kahn, Artistic Director of Shakespeare Theatre Company in Washington, D.C.

== Second Season ==
The twelve finalists were:

- Tess Benger, age 20, from Toronto, ON
- Alyssa Brizzi, age 16, from Burnaby, BC
- Leah Cogan, age 21, from Embrun, ON
- Andrew Cohen, age 19, from Richmond, BC
- Hailey Gillis, age 17, from Grimsby, ON
- David Light, age 21, from Prince Albert, SK
- Glen Mills, age 22, from Olds, AB
- Wilmari Myburgh, age 19, from Red Deer, AB
- Kaitlyn Semple, age 22, from Regina, SK
- Jen Shaw, age 22, from Red Deer, AB
- Cayley Thomas, age 17, from Edmonton, AB
- Liam Tobin, age 19, from St. John's, NL

The scholarship winners were:

- First prize: Leah Cogan
- First runner-up: Liam Tobin
