= Nicole Oliver =

Canadian actress

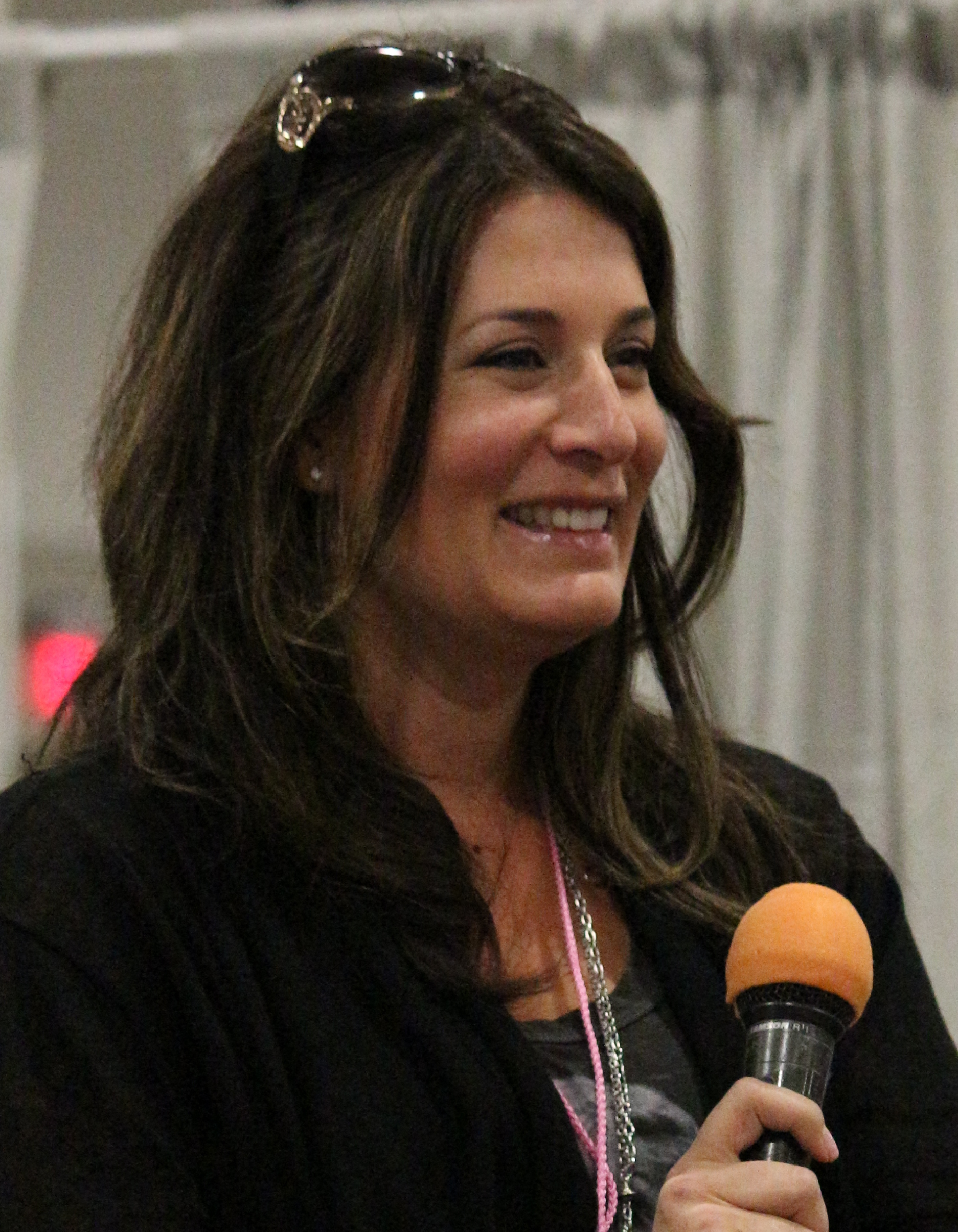
- Oliver at Animate! Miami in 2013
- Born: Nicole Lyn Oliver; Ottawa, Ontario, Canada
- Education: York University; Royal Roads University
- Occupation: Actress
- Years active: 1979–present
- Known for: Princess Celestia and Cheerilee in My Little Pony: Friendship Is Magic; Zoe Trent in Littlest Pet Shop
- Spouse: Chris Ainscough
- Children: 2
- Website: www.nicoleoliver.com

Nicole Lyn Oliver is a Canadian actress. She is best known for her roles as Princess Celestia and Cheerilee in My Little Pony: Friendship Is Magic, Zoe Trent in Littlest Pet Shop, and Meilin Rae in Cardcaptors.

== Biography ==
Oliver was born in Ottawa, Ontario. She has a Bachelor of Fine Arts from York University, a Master of Arts in Communication from Royal Roads University, and additional training by Jeremy Irons from the British American Drama Academy.

A prominent member of the Union of BC Performers, Oliver served on its executive board (2002–2005), chaired several committees, and continues to be part of the negotiation team during collective bargaining. In 2017, she was nominated for the Best Voice Award by UBCP ACTRA.

Oliver is married to film composer Chris Ainscough. They live in Vancouver with their two sons. She has stated on her Twitter account that she has battled depression.

== Filmography ==
=== Documentary ===
- A Brony Tale – Herself
- Bronies: The Extremely Unexpected Adult Fans of My Little Pony – Princess Celestia (archival audio)

=== Live-action roles ===
- Bond of Silence – Pat
- Crash Test Mommy – Host
- The Falling - Karis
- The Foursome – Lori Towers
- Kung Fu: The Legend Continues – Detective Kelly Blaine
- The L Word – Chanter
- A Vow to Kill – Linda Mason
- The Outer Limits – Jill Cooper (episode: "The Deprogrammers"), Heather Cattrell (episode: "Judgment Day")
- Arrow – Judge Sakow (episode: "Broken Hearts")
- Psych – Abby Daniels
- Seed – Mrs. Anderson
- Seven Deadly Sins – Principal Lowenstein
- The Silencer – Holly Sharp
- Stargate SG-1 – Leedora
- Supernatural – Nora Havelock (episode: "Repo Men")
- Wonder – Jack Will's Mom
- The Woodcarver – Rita Stevenson
- The Christmas Ornament – Sarah
- Three Bedrooms, One Corpse: An Aurora Teagarden Mystery – Eileen Crandall
- Britney Ever After – Lynne Spears
- Possessing Piper Rose – Gretchen

=== Live-action dubs ===
- Death Note – Naomi Misora
- L: Change the World – Naomi Misora
- #TweetIt: Featuring My Little Pony Staff and Bronies – Herself/Music Video

=== Animation roles ===
- A Chinese Ghost Story: The Tsui Hark Animation – Siu Seen
- Baby Looney Tunes – Tessa, Usher
- Barbie of Swan Lake – Carlita the Skunk
- Barbie Fairytopia: Mermaidia – Shellie
- Barbie in the 12 Dancing Princesses – Ashlyn, Twyla
- Barbie Mariposa and her Butterfly Fairy Friends – Henna
- Barbie and the Diamond Castle – Dori, Maid
- Barbie and the Three Musketeers – Corrine's Mother, Fancy Dress Girl #1
- Barbie in A Mermaid Tale – Calissa
- Barbie: Princess Charm School – Dame Devin
- Barbie in A Mermaid Tale 2 – Calissa
- Barbie in Rock 'N Royals – Lady Anne
- Barbie: A Fashion Fairytale – Liliana Roxelle
- Barbie: A Fairy Secret – Liliana Roxelle, the fitting room attendant
- Beat Bugs – Granny Bee (episode: Granny Bee)
- Billy the Cat – Anita, Goldfish, Claudia Shifter, Rita, Mme Irma
- Bob the Builder – Mayor Madison (US)
- Bratz Babyz: Save Christmas – Portia (Note: Name confirmed on the box of her doll form in the 2008 World Familez collection.) (Yasmin's mother)
- Bratz Kidz: Sleep-Over Adventure – Tanya (Meygan's sister)
- Capertown Cops
- Cardcaptors – Meilin Rae, Maggie
- Cardcaptors: The Movie – Su Yung, Meilin Rae, Maggie, Sorceress
- Class of the Titans – Arachne, Fortuna, Jay's Mother, Nemesis
- Corner Gas Animated – Louise, Pregnant Woman #2
- The Cramp Twins – Dorothy Cramp, Little Kid, Teen Assistant
- The Deep – Commander Pyrosome
- Dinosaur Train – Brenda Brachiosaurus & Mrs. Pliosaurus
- Dokkoida!? – Sayuri Yurine/Hyacint
- The Dragon Prince - Zubeia
- Dragon Ball Z (Ocean Group dub) – Chi-Chi (episodes 254-276)
- Dragon Booster – Pyrrah, Sentrus
- Dragon Tales – Shrinking Violet
- Dumb Bunnies – Felony
- Edgar and Ellen – Mrs. Moon Violet
- Elemental Gelade – Eve
- Fat Dog Mendoza – Brenda, Alien #2, Cookie Customer, Robot Baby, Company Employee #2, Company Employee #4, Female Reporter, Female Superboots Customer, Laura the Sock Puppet
- Firehouse Tales – Additional Voices
- Galaxy Express 999, Adieu Galaxy Express 999 – Emeraldas
- Generation O! – Lacey, Shubert Sister
- Ghost Patrol – Ms. Flores, Rich Woman
- The Girl Who Leapt Through Time – Makoto's Mother (Mrs. Konno)
- Hamtaro – Pepper
- He-Man and the Masters of the Universe (2002) – Queen Marlena, The Sorceress of Castle Grayskull
- The Hollow – Tree, Spider-Woman, Adam's Mom, Brynhilda, Pixie 1, Old Lady
- Hulk Vs. – Betty Ross, Brunnhilde
- Inuyasha – Additional Voices
- Inuyasha the Movie: The Castle Beyond the Looking Glass – Princess Kaguya
- Johnny Test - Daisy, Announcer (2)
- Kate & Mim-Mim – Valerie
- Key the Metal Idol – Tokiko "Key" Mima
- Kong: The Animated Series – Tiger Lucy
- Krypto the Superdog – Kevin's Mom, Mrs Sussman, various
- Kurozuka – Kagetsu
- The Last Kids on Earth - Bear
- Lego Elves – Rosalyn Nightshade
- Lego Dreamzzz: - Never Witch
- Lego Star Wars: Droid Tales – Hera Syndulla
- Let's Go Quintuplets – Ms. Carruthers
- Littlest Pet Shop – Zoe Trent, additional voices
- Martha Speaks – Mrs. Clusky, Janice Kennelly
- Marvel Super Hero Adventures - Morgan le Fay
- Mary-Kate and Ashley in Action! – Additional Voices
- Max Steel – Molly McGrath
- MegaMan: NT Warrior – Mrs. Hikari
- Milo's Bug Quest – Kathy Leaf
- Mobile Suit Gundam SEED – Via Hibiki
- Mobile Suit Gundam 00 – Regene Regetta
- Mosaic – Agent Newell
- My Little Pony: Friendship Is Magic – Princess Celestia, Cheerilee, Cinnamon Chai, Crystal Pony #1, "Crystal Pony #1, Daybreaker, Dr. Fauna, Dragon #1, Fleur Dis Lee, "Foal" (S06E01), Fume, Narrator (S01E01), Spitfire (S01E16), Tree Hugger, Twinkleshine (S01E01, first line)
- My Little Pony: Equestria Girls – Principal/Princess Celestia and Miss Cheerilee
- My Little Pony: Equestria Girls – Rainbow Rocks – Principal Celestia
- My Little Pony: Equestria Girls – Friendship Games – Principal Celestia
- My Little Pony: Equestria Girls – Legend of Everfree – Principal Celestia
- My Little Pony: The Movie – Princess Celestia and Lix Spittle
- My Little Pony: Pony Life – Princess Celestia, Cheerilee
- Next Avengers: Heroes of Tomorrow – Betty Ross, Jocasta
- Night Warriors: Darkstalkers' Revenge – Hsien-Ko
- Ninjago: Dragons Rising - Empress Beatrix, Zeatrix
- Ninjago – Dogshank, Girl Pirate
- Ōban Star-Racers – Maya Wei
- Pac-Man and the Ghostly Adventures – Jean
- Packages from Planet X – Dan's Mother, Additional Voices
- Pirate Express – Queen #1
- Polly Pocket – Mrs. Johnson, Ms. Fuss, Dr. Laguna, Miss Dementor, Ava's mom
- Pony Royale – Rosie
- Powerpuff Girls Z – Ms. Bellum, Beetle Betty, Coco Cheval
- The Princess Twins of Legendale – Queen Luna
- Ranma ½ – Miyo (season 3), Ling-Ling (seasons 3–4), Lung-Lung (seasons 3–4), Yotaro's Mother (season 4), Additional Voices (English version)
- RollBots – Manx
- Saber Marionette J – Cherry (during the 2nd half of the series), Baiko
- Sabrina, the Animated Series – Gemini Stone (adult)
- Sara Solves It – Pizza Delivery Lady, Cornelia
- Sausage Party – Sally Bun, Female Shopper #1, Ice Cream, Watermelon
- Silent Möbius – Katsumi Liqueur
- Sitting Ducks – Mother Duck
- Storm Hawks – Starling, Suzi-Lu, Skyside Shanty Waitress
- The Story of Saiunkoku – Shusui Hyo, Boy 1, Court Lady 1, Setsugyoku
- Strawberry Shortcake's Berry Bitty Adventures – Jadeybug, Dr. Hazel Nutby (ep. 9)
- Super Dinosaur – Hilda, Robot One, Female Earth Core Tech (2)
- Super Monsters – Cleo's Mom
- Tom and Jerry Tales – Mrs. Two Shoes, Baby Booties
- Transformers: Energon – Sally Jones, Miranda Jones
- Ultimate Book of Spells – Elsa
- Ultimate Wolverine vs. Hulk – Jennifer Walters
- Ultraforce – Chrysalis, Veil
- Ultraviolet: Code 044 - Matilda
- Valley of the Lanterns – Olistene & Mother
- The Vision of Escaflowne – Nariya, Eriya, Hitomi's grandmother (Bandai Entertainment dub)
- What About Mimi? – Additional Voices
- X-Men: Evolution – Risty Wilde
- Yvon of the Yukon – Maxine

=== Video games ===
- Dynasty Warriors: Gundam 2 – Katejina Loos
- Dynasty Warriors: Gundam 3 – Katejina Loos
- He-Man: Defender of Grayskull – The Sorceress
- Legends of Runeterra - Diana
- My Little Pony – Princess Celestia, Cheerilee
- StarCraft II – First Ascendant Ji'nara
- Thimbleweed Park – Agent Ray
- Warhammer 40,000: Dawn of War – Eldar Farseer, Howling Banshees, Farseer Macha
- Warhammer 40,000: Dawn of War: Dark Crusade – Farseer Taldeer
- Warhammer 40,000: Dawn of War: Soulstorm – Farseer Caerys

=== Voice director ===
- Enchantimals: Finding Home
- Hatchimals: Adventures in Hatchtopia
- Molly of Denali
- The Guava Juice Show
