= Monster Beach =

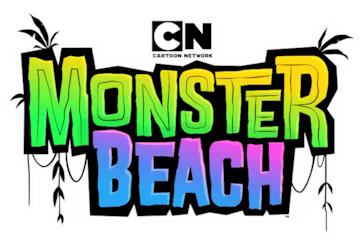
- The logo
- Genre: Comedy horror
- Created by: Bruce Kane (concept); Maurice Argiro; Patrick Crawley
- Directed by: Patrick Crawley
- Voices of: (See Voice cast)
- Opening theme: "Monster Beach"
- Ending theme: "Monster Beach" (instrumental)
- Composer: Raúl Sánchez
- Country of origin: Australia
- Original language: English
- No. of episodes: 48

Production
- Executive producers: Silas Hickey; Yoshiya Ayugai
- Producer: Bruce Kane
- Editor: Ken Hardie
- Running time: 70 minutes (film); 11 minutes (series)
- Production companies: Bogan Entertainment Solutions; Fragrant Gumtree Entertainment

Original release
- Network: Cartoon Network
- Release: 11 April – 16 December 2020

Monster Beach is an Australian television series created by Bruce Kane, Maurice Argiro (who also created Kitty Is Not a Cat) and Patrick Crawley, which first premiered as a 70-minute TV special on Cartoon Network on 31 October 2014 and was then later commissioned as a full series airing in 2020. Originally produced by the companies Bogan Entertainment Solutions (later Studio Moshi) and Fragrant Gumtree Entertainment (in association with Cartoon Network Asia Pacific), it's the second locally animated production to be commissioned by the channel after Exchange Student Zero. It was released on DVD on 1 June 2016 from Madman Entertainment.

In 2017, a series was greenlit by Cartoon Network for a 52-episode TV series consisting of 11-minute episodes; a pilot episode based on the televised film itself was announced, but never released.

The series started airing on Cartoon Network Australia on 11 April 2020 and won Best Animated TV Programme at the 2020 Content Asia Awards. Monster Beach is animated by Studio Moshi in Australia and Inspidea in Malaysia.

== Synopsis ==
Jan and Dean are visiting their Uncle Woody on Iki-Iki Island for a relaxing Summer vacation at Monsoon Beach, however they soon discover that it is now become "Monster Beach" when the late king's son Dr. Knutt used voodoo magic to curse the friendly beach-goers (and accidentally himself) into monsters. Eventually the two siblings enjoy hanging out with their new ghoulish friends and have fun adventures with them, but often have to deal with anything that ruins their fun like Dr. Knutt trying to take over his late father's island with the help of his Tiki minions, and the business antics of greedy resort tycoon Frances Butterfield.

== Characters ==
- Jan (voiced by Kazumi Evans): Dean's thrill seeking sister who likes to explore around the beach.
- Dean (voiced by Elishia Perosa): Jan's tech-wiz brother who has no experience in surfing.
- Uncle Woody (voiced by Garry Chalk): Jan and Dean's laid-back uncle who is put in charge of the beach by the late King Aina Haina. He was given ownership of the island because the late king saw he actually cared for the island and its inhabitants. Woody and Aina Haina were great friends back then. Woody taught the king how to surf while Aina Haina taught Woody how to find his subconscious dude. He is the only human unchanged by Knutt's curse because the deed makes him immune to his magic.
- Brainfreeze (voiced by Bill Newton): The mellowed and forgetful owner of a surf shack who was turned into an ogre.
- Widget (voiced by Kelly Sheridan): A beach girl who got turned into a stitched up zombie, resulting her to try to put herself together.
- The Mutt (voiced by Rove McManus): The wild mechanic of a repair shop who got turned into a werewolf. It turns out that during a full moon, he will transform into a human accountant named Walter.
- Amphibia (voiced by Nadeen Lightbody): A Jamaican yoga instructor who got turned into a swamp creature and has an octopus named Octavia on her head to act as her hair. She is shown to have the ability to speak to animals and create tsunamis when she gets angry.
- Stress Leave (voiced by Hiro Kanagawa) A stressful Japanese work accountant who got turned into a gremlin and usually does his job inside a phone booth.
- Lost Patrol (voiced by Brian Dobson): The drill sergeant lifeguard of the beach who was turned into a mechanized frankenstein.
- Mad Madge (voiced by Patrick Crawley): The owner of the diner who got turned into a frog, serving disgusting food that mostly the monsters would eat.
- Headache (voiced by Brian Dobson): Madge's brutish fry cook that became a shrunken head who hates it when anybody complains about his cooking, he will yell out a huge roar when he is enraged.
- The Murmurmaids (voiced by Kazumi Evans and Kelly Sheridan): Two snobby beach-goers who got turned into mermaids, however refuse to go into the ocean.
- Mummy's Boy (voiced by Brian Dobson): An accident-prone mummy who often get his bandages loose.
- Teddles (voiced by Patrick Crawley): A childish anglerfish monster that lives inside a trailer home.
- Dr. Knutt (voiced by Rove McManus): A wannabe sorcerer and King Aina Haina's son who is responsible for turning the beach-goers into monsters in an attempt to take over the island, unfortunately he was turned into a fiery tiki head.
- The Tikis (all voiced by Brian Drummond): Small bumbling tikis that Dr. Knutt brought to life as his loyal minions.
- Frances Butterfield (voiced by Stephen Hall): The greedy resort tycoon who tries many business schemes to make money, he also seeks to rid the monsters off of Iki-Iki Island due to them scaring off the tourists.
- Hodad (voiced by Rove McManus): Butterfield's cowardly assistant who unwillingly does what his boss wants.

== Episodes ==
1. It Cone From Outer Space
2. Knutt Drops In
3. Ghoul Vibrations
4. Frights! Camera! Action!
5. Striking Bad
6. Doommates
7. I Lava To Surf
8. Tiki'D Off
9. Next To Dogliness
10. Termite Nation
11. Gone Wishin
12. Swampy Thing
13. Lagoon Goons
14. High Seas High Jinx
15. Widget Loses her Head
16. Knutty And Nice
17. Surf Power
18. Treasure Hunters
19. Bored Games
20. Talk to the Hand
21. The Back Nine
22. Madge's Mug
23. Switch Doctor
24. Micro Monsters
25. Monster Safari
26. Pet Rocked
27. Lost and Found Patrol
28. Brain Thaw
29. Fun Service
30. Whale of a Problem
31. Euro So Talented
32. Butterknutt Squash
33. The Murmurmen Boys
34. Boo Plate Special
35. You've Been Served
36. Daredevil May Careful
37. Monster Wrestling
38. Jailhouse Mutt
39. Monster Make Over
40. 3 Monsters and a Tiki
41. Dr. BFF
42. Monster Nerd Out
43. Short on Shorts
44. Where Wolf
45. Mayor or Mayor Not
46. Rain Damage
47. Teddle's Teddy
48. Invisible Manny
