= Enchantimals =

Media-supported toy line by Mattel

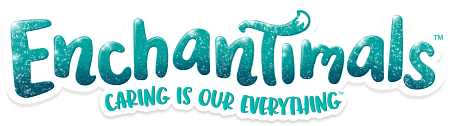
- Type: Fashion dolls
- Company: Mattel
- Country: United States
- Availability: July 18, 2017–present
- Materials: Plastic
- Slogan: Caring Is Our Everything
- Official website

Enchantimals is a media franchise-supported toyline that launched in July 2017, by American multinational toy company Mattel as a companion to Ever After High and the second spin-off to Monster High. The line consists of human–animal hybrids and their woodland creature pets who live in a fictional setting of Everwilde. The Enchantimals media include a web series, books, and a television special. The franchise development began in late 2015 and its toys were first released in June 2017.

== Development and release ==
Development began in late 2015 after Ever After High dolls ceased production. The toys were first released in June 2017. The franchise originally began as part of the Ever After High franchise with the characters as smaller, animal-themed pixies. Trademarks were filed in January 2016, for a line called "Pixie World", which was to be a pixie-centric arc that was to follow the introductions of two groups of pixies in mid December 2015 and early June 2016.

Following the discontinuation of the EAH toy line, the "Pixie World" line was scrapped, but served as the basis for Enchantimals. Its heritage, however, speaks only from its core concepts and is thus farther removed from its predecessors than Ever After High was from Monster High.

Enchantimals has not received similar marketing, being only recognizable as part of the greater whole due to similarities. It is unknown if this is intentional as a means for Mattel to start afresh, which is suggested by the avoiding of the high school setting, or a consequence of the cancellation and rebooting of the older two franchises. Like its predecessors with Bratz and Disney Princess, Enchantimals takes a cue or two from competing doll franchises.

My Little Pony's 2010 incarnation and its spin-off Equestria Girls, as well as the 2012 Littlest Pet Shop toyline, all done by Mattel's long-time main rival Hasbro, is the inspiration of Enchantimals' themes of nature and group-based friendship. Mattel looked on into them as Hasbro made a deal with Disney to produce newer licensed toys and games. Mattel itself has pointed at the "popular animal aesthetic [as seen in] social media filters" as a direct inspiration for the franchise, though whether this means the earlier pixies were based on the filters or if the filters account for the design difference between the pixies and the Enchantimals is not specified. The choice for the small size of the Enchantimals dolls has been ascribed to the market influence of the 2014 franchise Shopkins with emphasis on its 2015 doll spin-off Shoppies.

== Characters ==
=== Friendship Forest inhabitants ===
- Bren Bear (voiced by Rebecca Shoichet and Rachel Butera)
- Hixby Hedgehog
- Ohana Owl
- Raelin Raccoon
- Sancha Squirrel (voiced by Kimberly Woods)
- Kani & Yawn - owls of Ohana
- Pester & Romy - raccoons of Raelin
- Pointer - hedgehog of Hixby
- Snore & Zia - bears of Bren (Snore voiced by Rebecca Shoichet and Larissa Gallagher)
- Stumper - squirrel of Sancha

=== Frozenwood inhabitants ===
- Pawbry Polar Bear
- Preena Penguin (voiced by Rebecca Shoichet, Larissa Gallagher)
- Winsley Wolf (voiced by Polly Eachus)
- Jayla - penguin of Preena (voiced by Rebecca Shoichet, Kate Higgins and Larissa Gallagher)
- Melt - polar bear of Pawbry
- Trooper - wolf of Winsley

=== Grazy Grasslands inhabitants ===
- Cherish Cheetah (voiced by Noveen Crumbie)
- Ekaterina Elephant (voiced by Salome Mergia)
- Fanci Flamingo (voiced by Karen Strassman)
- Gillian Giraffe (voiced by Jeannie Elias)
- Liora Lion
- Merit Monkey (voiced by Salli Saffioti)
- Zelena Zebra (voiced by Francesca Manzi)
- Antic - elephant of Ekaterina
- Compass - monkey of Merit
- Hoofette - zebra of Zelena
- Kiba & Swash - flamingos of Fanci
- Pawl - giraffe of Gillian (voiced by Jeannie Elias)
- Quick-Quick - cheetah of Cherish (voiced by Noveen Crumbie)
- Snazzy - lion of Liora

=== Harvest Hills inhabitants ===
- Cailey Cow
- Cambrie Cow (voiced by Salli Saffioti)
- Ciesta Cat (voiced by Paula Rhodes)
- Dinah Duck (voiced by Lizzie Freeman)
- Haydie Horse (voiced by Paula Rhodes)
- Lluella Llama
- Lorna Lamb (voiced by Patty Mattson)
- Mayla Mouse
- Petya Pig
- Redward Rooster
- Banana, Butter, Corn & Sloh - ducks of Dinah
- Cheese, Mac & Ricotta - cows of Cambrie
- Climber - cat of Ciesta
- Cluck - rooster of Redward
- Curdle - cow of Cailey
- Flag - lamb of Lorna
- Fleecy - llama of Lluella
- Fondue - mouse of Mayla
- Nisha & Streusel - pigs of Petya
- Trotter - horse of Haydie

=== Junglewood inhabitants ===
- Andie Alligator
- Effie Elephant (voiced by Cristina Vee)
- Hedda Hippo
- Karina Koala
- Larissa Lemur (voiced by Tara Sands)
- Mika Monkey (voiced by Kimberly Woods)
- Patter Peacock (voiced by Sabrina Pitre and Jonquil Goode)
- Peeki Parrot (voiced by Melissa Mabie)
- Prue Panda
- Sela Sloth (voiced by Cindy Robinson)
- Tadley Tiger
- Tamika Tree Frog (voiced by Cindy Robinson)
- Tanzie Tiger
- Burst - tree frog of Tamika
- Dab - koala of Karina
- Flap - peacock of Patter (voiced by Benjamin Diskin and Doug Erholtz)
- Kitty - white tiger of Tadley
- Lake - hippopotamus of Hedda
- Marshy - alligator of Andie
- Nari - panda of Prue
- Ringlet - lemur of Larissa
- Sheeny - parrot of Peeki
- Sway - elephant of Effie
- Swing - monkey of Mika
- Treebody - sloth of Sela
- Tuft - tiger of Tanzie

=== Petal Park inhabitants ===
- Baxi Butterfly
- Beetrice Bee
- Cay Caterpillar
- Dara Dragonfly
- Ladelia Ladybug
- Saxon Snail
- Dawdle - snail of Saxon
- Pollen - bee of Beetrice
- Scriggly - caterpillar of Cay
- Swift - dragonfly of Dara
- Vine - ladybug Ladelia
- Wingrid - butterfly Baxi

=== Royal Isle inhabitants ===
- Alessandro Lion
- Ambrose Unicorn
- Bannon Bear
- Braylee Bear
- Brystal Bunny
- Deanna Dragon (voiced by Cristina Vee)
- Fabrina Fox
- Falon Phoenix
- Maura Mermaid
- Paolina Pegasus
- Peola Pony
- Queen Daviana Deer
- Queen Paradise Peacock
- Queen Unity Unicorn
- Sarely Swan
- Bowey - bear of Bannon
- Catch - lion of Alessandro
- Climmer - unicorn of Ambrose
- Frisk - fox of Fabrina
- Glide - fish of Maura
- Grace, Scramble & Spring - bunnies of Brystal
- Grassy - deer of Queen Daviana
- Honey - bear of Braylee
- Petite - pony of Peola
- Pointe - swan of Sarely
- Rainbow - peacock of Queen Paradise
- Roast, Steam & Whisk - dragons of Deanna
- Stepper - unicorn of Queen Unity
- Sunrise - phoenix of Falon
- Wingley - pegasus of Paolina

=== Snowy Valley inhabitants ===
- Bevy Bunny (voiced by Debi Derryberry)
- Hawna Husky (voiced by Sarah Anne Williams)
- Nadie Narwhal
- Odele Owl
- Patterson Penguin (voiced by Jordan Quisno)
- Pristina Polar Bear (voiced by Cassandra Lee Morris)
- Rainey Reindeer
- Sashay Seal
- Sharlotte Squirrel
- Sybill Snow Leopard (voiced by Alex Cartañá)
- Bubbler - seal of Sashay
- Cruise, Patrol, & Voyage - snowy owls of Odele
- Diver, Glacier, & Paddle - polar bears of Pristina
- Flake - snow leopard of Sybill
- Gallop, Jogger, & Marathon - reindeers of Rainey
- Jump - bunny of Bevy
- Sword - narwhal of Nadie
- Tux - penguin of Patterson
- Walnut - squirrel of Sharlotte
- Whiped Cream - husky of Hawna

=== Sunny Savanna inhabitants ===
- Esmeralda Elephant
- Gabriela Gazelle
- Griselda Giraffe
- Kamilla Kangaroo
- Lacey Lion
- Ofelia Ostrich
- Zadie Zebra
- Antenna & Stompah - giraffe and elephant of Griselda
- Feathers, Flapper, & Rapid - ostriches of Ofelia
- Graceful, Mammoth, & Prunie - elephants of Esmeralda
- Joey, Stachel & Tote - kangaroos of Kamilla
- Manesy - lion of Lacey
- Racer - gazelle of Gabriela
- Ref - zebra of Zadie

=== Wishing Waters inhabitants ===
- Cameo Crab
- Clarita Clownfish
- Dolce Dolphin
- Jessa Jellyfish
- Sandella Seahorse
- Starling Starfish
- Taylee Turtle
- Bounder - turtle of Taylee
- Cackle - clownfish of Clarita
- Chela & Courtney - crabs of Cameo
- Idyl & Ripple - starfishes of Starling
- Kira & Serafina - seahorses of Sandella
- Largo - dolphin of Dolce
- Marisa - jellyfish of Jessa

=== Wonderwood inhabitants ===
- Blyss Bunny
- Bree Bunny (voiced by Maryke Hendrikse and Rachel Butera)
- Danessa Deer (voiced by Diana Kaarina and Tara Sands)
- Felicity Fox (voiced by Kazumi Evans, Kate Higgins and Julie Ann Taylor)
- Fluffy Bunny
- Saffi Swan
- Sage Skunk (voiced by Rebecca Shoichet and Rachel Butera)
- Patter Peacock (voiced by Sabrina Pitre and Jonquil Goode)
- Caper - skunk of Sage (voiced by Rebecca Shoichet and Rachel Butera)
- Flap - peacock of Patter
- Flick - fox of Felicity (voiced by Kazumi Evans and Michelle Ruff)
- Mop - bunny of Fluffy
- Oatsy - bunny of Blyss
- Poise - swan of Saffi
- Sprint - deer of Danessa (voiced by Sam Vincent and Doug Erholtz)
- Twist - bunny of Bree (voiced by Maryke Hendrikse and Rachel Butera)

== Media ==
The by-products from Mattel's media strategy with Enchantimals include a web series, books and a television special.
