= Diana Kaarina =

Canadian actress

- Born: Vancouver, British Columbia, Canada
- Occupation: Actress
- Years active: 2010–present

Diana Kaarina is a Canadian actress based in Vancouver, British Columbia. She is known for her voice acting work in animation and video games, notably as the voice of Barbie in the eponymous film series between 2010 and 2011. She is also active in theatrical performances.

== Career ==
Kaarina was born in Vancouver, British Columbia and raised in Richmond, British Columbia. She got her start with Theatre Under the Stars in Stanley Park and has performed in Canadian and Broadway productions of numerous musicals, including Anne of Green Gables – The Musical, The Phantom of the Opera, Les Misérables, and Rent.

In 2012, she provided the voice of Kelly Hamdon in SheZow.

In 2014, she provided the voice of Aria Blaze in My Little Pony: Equestria Girls – Rainbow Rocks.

In 2015, she provided the voice of Matilda Marshall in The Deep.

In 2018, Kaarina voices both Roxie McTerrier and Petula Woolwright in Littlest Pet Shop: A World of Our Own. She provided the voice of Vanessa in The Hollow.

Kaarina has also done voiceovers for various radio commercials and PSAs.

== Filmography ==
=== Animation ===
- Adventures of Ayuma (short) - Lamia
- Barbie: A Camping We Will Go (short) - Barbie
- Barbie: A Fashion Fairytale - Barbie
- Barbie: A Fairy Secret - Barbie
- Barbie: A Perfect Christmas - Barbie
- Barbie: Princess Charm School - Blair Willows
- Beat Bugs - Lady Madonna, Olga
- Bob's Broken Sleigh - Accountant Elf
- Care Bears: Adventures in Care-a-Lot - Laugh-A-Lot Bear (episode: ″Battle of the Bands")
- Corner Gas Animated - Kendra
- The Deep - Matilda Marshall, Dr. Jennifer Chan
- Dinosaur Train - Tricia Troodon
- Enchantimals - Danessa Deer
- Future Boy Conan - Tera
- The Hollow - Vanessa, Pixie #2
- L.O.R.D: Legend of Ravaging Dynasties - Kira
- LEGO Friends: Heartlake Stories - Monica, Maya
- The Little Prince - Okimi
- LEGO Ninjago: Dragons Rising - Jordana, Ninja-Fan Infinity, Motion Symbol, Motion Source Dragon
- Littlest Pet Shop - Gracie Plansville, Mitzi, Lucky Browne, Deer, Panda #2, Sweetly Ganache, Yellow Bunny, Hopley Grazer, Ritzy Rococo, Mellowy Lilacs, Cherie Bow-Wow, Milah, Daphne Deerheart, Essie Beagleton, Roxy Reddington, Stripes Reddy, Albany Perth, Chi-Chi Ostos, Grayden Snows, Bria Bunner
- Littlest Pet Shop: A World of Our Own - Roxie McTerrier, Petula Woolwright, Happy Puppy, Edie Von Keet (singing voice), Dog #8, Snake, Human, Bella Flamenco, Husky, Julia Chillavanilla, Bumble Bee, Dooley Wolfhound, Skyla Wolfton, Furrocious Fran
- LoliRock - Lily Bowman
- Marvel Super Hero Adventures - Nebula
- Maya the Bee - Lara the Ladybug, Beatrice the Butterfly
- Mighty Mighty Monsters in New Fears Eve - Destiny
- My Little Pony: Equestria Girls – Rainbow Rocks - Aria Blaze
- My Little Pony: Equestria Girls – Sunset's Backstage Pass - Aria Blaze
- My Little Pony: Friendship Is Magic - Saffron Masala, Burly Unicorn, Canterlot Pony #2 (episode: "Spice Up Your Life"), Shimmy Shake, Aura, Noi, Neat-Maned Townspony, Helia, Heidi Hay, Coral Shores, Earth Filly #3, Unicorn Filly #2
- My Little Pony: Pony Life - Skull Pony, Uranus, Girl Pony #3, Banana Fluff, Cupcake
- My Little Pony: A New Generation - Yellow Unicorn, Earth Pony
- Polly Pocket - Mrs. Bigowski (episode: "The Big Ball")
- Rock Dog 3: Battle the Beat - Mia
- SheZow - Kelly Hamdon
- Shopkins: Wild - Hip Hip Hamster, Candy Sweets, Valentine Heart, others
- StarBeam - Mom/WonderBeam, Tricksy, Aquarium Worker
- Strawberry Shortcake's Berry Bitty Adventures - Sour Grapes, Baby Berrykin #2, Elsa, Berrykin Race Official
- Strawberry Shortcake: Berry in the Big City - Blueberry Muffin, Everything Muffin, Everything Bagel, Cheesecake, Customer #2, Mrs. Crumbcake, Wasabi
- Sunburnt Unicorn - Frankie
- Super Dinosaur - Agent Wan
- Super Monsters - Spike, Mrs. Gong, Sami, Mrs. Sandford, Chompy, Abigail's Mom
- Supernatural Academy - Santra, Zadi, Borchild, Nimbu
- We're Lalaloopsy - Rosy Bumps 'n Bruises
- World Trigger - Sakurako Taketomi, Nozomi Kako, Sayoko Shiki

=== Video games ===
- Infinity Strash: Dragon Quest The Adventure of Dai - Maam
- Little Battlers Experience - Rika Yazawa
- Lumote - Lumote
- Rift of the NecroDancer - Reaper

=== Theatre ===
- Anne of Green Gables – The Musical - Diana Barry, Anne Shirley (understudy)
- Les Misérables - Eponine
- The Marvelous Wonderettes - Suzy
- The Phantom of the Opera - Meg Giry
- Rent - Mimi Márquez, Maureen Johnson (swing)
- Thoroughly Modern Millie - Millie Dillmount, Miss Dorothy Brown
