= Kazumi Evans =

Canadian actress

- Born: Vancouver, British Columbia, Canada
- Occupation: Actress
- Years active: 2007–present
- Spouse: Xerius R. Anklesaria

Kazumi Evans is a Canadian actress. She began her career as a contestant on the CBC's Triple Sensation. As a voice actress, she has voiced Iris in LoliRock, Saffi in Bob the Builder, Madeline in The Deep, and Skipper in the Barbie films.

== Career ==
Evans trained at the Central Pennsylvania Youth Ballet, the Richmond Academy of Dance, and the Goh Ballet before becoming known as a voice actress. In 2007, Evans appeared as a contestant on the first season of the reality television series Triple Sensation to win a scholarship to a theatrical training institution. She was among the twelve finalists to reach the Master Class stage, but she did not win.

== Filmography ==
=== Live-action ===
List of live-action performances
Year	Title	Role	Notes
2007	Triple Sensation	Herself	Season 1 contestant
2009	The Troop	Cheerleader #2 (Paige)	Episode: "Pajama Game... of Death"
2015	Murder, She Baked: A Plum Pudding Murder Mystery	Elf Molly	TV movie
2015-2016	The Bridge	Jenny	Hallmark TV Movie in two parts
2016	Every Christmas Has a Story	Sam/Receptionist	Hallmark Channel Movie
2016–2018	Mech-X4	Jessica	Recurring role
2017	Last Night in Suburbia	Julia	
2017	Descendants 2	Press Person 2	Disney Channel Original Movie
2017	With Love, Christmas	Tracy	Hallmark Channel Movie
2018	A Gingerbread Christmas	Josephine	Hallmark Channel Movie
2019	A Winter Princess	Brittney	Hallmark Channel Movie
2019	The Mistletoe Secret	Leslie	Hallmark Channel Movie
2019	A Blue Ridge Mountain Christmas	Tasha	Hallmark Movies & Mysteries Movie
2020	The Christmas Ring	Sarah	TV movie
2020	Wedding Every Weekend	Wedding Planner	Hallmark Channel Movie
2021	Don't Go Breaking My Heart	Client	Hallmark Channel Movie
2021	A Clüsterfünke Christmas	Bestie	TV movie
2022	Quarantine Fling	Jacqueline	Short film
2022	Wok Hei		Short film

=== Animation ===
List of voice performances in animation
Year	Title	Role	Notes
2010	The Little Prince	Brooklyn	English dub
2010–2019	My Little Pony: Friendship Is Magic	Rarity (singing voice), Princess Luna (singing voice, "Twilight's Kingdom - Part 1"), Octavia Melody, Moondancer, Rose ("Slice of Life"), Wrangler ("Fluttershy Leans In")	
2011	Barbie: Princess Charm School	Harmony	
2013	My Little Pony: Equestria Girls	Rarity (singing voice)	
2013	Barbie & Her Sisters in a Pony Tale	Skipper	
2013	Littlest Pet Shop	Featured Singer	Episode: "Missing Blythe"
2014	Wolverine vs. Sabretooth	Rogue, Boomer, Computer	Mini-series
2014	My Little Pony: Equestria Girls – Rainbow Rocks	Adagio Dazzle, Rarity (singing voice), Octavia Melody	
2014	Under Wraps	Eleanor	Direct-to-video film
2014	Monster Beach	Jan	TV movie
2014–2015	Dr. Dimensionpants	Amanda Lipton	Recurring role
2014–2017	LoliRock	Princess Iris	Main role
2015	Pac-Man and the Ghostly Adventures	Elliptika "Elli"	Episode: "New Girl in Town"
2015	My Little Pony: Equestria Girls – Friendship Games	Rarity (singing voice)	
2015	Barbie & Her Sisters in the Great Puppy Adventure	Skipper, Lady Mistaken for Barbie	
2015–2022	The Deep	Mad Madeline	
2015–2017	Bob the Builder	Saffi	US dub
2016	Mack & Moxy	Penny the Boptopus	Episode: "A Bop-Topus' Garden"
2016	Barbie and Her Sisters in a Puppy Chase	Skipper	
2016	L.O.R.D: Legend of Ravaging Dynasties	Guishan Lian Quan	English dub
2016	My Little Pony: Equestria Girls – Legend of Everfree	Rarity (singing voice)	
2017	My Little Pony: The Movie	Rarity (singing voice)	
2017	We're Lalaloopsy	Jewel Sparkles	TV series
2017	Enchantimals	Felicity Fox, Flick Fox	
2017	Barbie: Dolphin Magic	Skipper	
2018	Henchmen	Pep Girl Twin Odyssey	
2018–2020	Polly Pocket	Shani Smith, Miss Sangha	Seasons 1 and 2 only
2019	The Dragon Prince	Queen Sarai, Town Doctor	Season 2
2019	My Little Pony: Rainbow Roadtrip	Rarity (singing voice)	TV special
2019	My Little Pony Equestria Girls – Sunset's Backstage Pass	Adagio Dazzle	TV special
2020	The Hollow	Nisha	
2020	Monster Beach	Jan / Murmurmaid 2	
2020–2021	Dorg Van Dango	Yooki	
2021	Future Boy Conan	Monsley	
2022	Johnny Test	Sally	
2022–2024	Sonic Prime	Rouge the Bat, Rebel Rouge, Prim Rouge, Batten Rouge	
2023–present	Ninjago: Dragons Rising	Wyldfyre, Rontu	
