= BrickFair =

US Lego convention

- Status: Active
- Genre: Lego
- Frequency: Quarterly
- Venue: Dulles Expo Center
- Location: Chantilly, Virginia
- Country: United States
- Inaugurated: August 29, 2008; 18 years ago
- Attendance: 22,500 (2014)
- Organizer: Todd Webb
- Website: www.brickfair.com

BrickFair is a Lego convention and exhibition held annually in the Eastern United States. It was first held in 2008 at Tysons Corner, Virginia by Todd Webb, and in subsequent years, the flagship Virginia convention has been held in Chantilly, typically during the first weekend of August. BrickFair is a four-day event, operating generally Thursday through Sunday. The convention displays Lego models, displays and trains, most often covering more than 100,000 square feet of convention space. BrickFair conventions are also held in New England and the Southeastern United States, with the advent of BrickFair Alabama in 2012 and BrickFair New England in 2013. BrickFair operates in every season and in four East Coast states. BrickFair is believed to be the largest Lego convention in the United States and one of the largest in the world. The Virginia convention has had up to 22,500 attendees in its public hours.

== History and organization ==
The first BrickFair convention, in 2008, was held as a four-day convention at the Sheraton Premiere Hotel near Tysons Corner in Vienna, Virginia. The location was partially chosen because it was the 2006 site of BrickFest, a now-defunct Lego convention. In 2010, BrickFair was moved to the Dulles Expo Center in Chantilly, VA to make room for further expansion of the event. The Virginia convention of BrickFair is still held annually at the Dulles Expo Center. BrickFair increased the number of events each year by adding an event in Birmingham, Alabama in January 2012. In May 2013, the convention expanded to New England with an event in Manchester, New Hampshire. At the 2013 Virginia BrickFair event, it was announced that BrickFair would be opening an annual exhibition in New Jersey, with its first event being held in 2014 at the Garden State Expo Center in Somerset, New Jersey.

A decision was made in late 2017 that the New England convention would no longer occur. Then, in Summer of 2018, it was announced that the NJ convention was no longer going to happen. Instead, one convention per year would visit different cities, starting with Charlotte NC in 2019. As a result, in 2018, only two conventions will take place: Alabama and Virginia.

=== Charity event ===
From the initial stages of planning, BrickFair was designed to be linked with a children's charity. The chosen charity is Maryland-based, named The SladeChild Foundation Charitable Trust. The charity provides food, shelter, clothing, and medicine to children around the world. The Foundation has been supported by BrickFair since 2008, and has a booth at BrickFair Virginia each August. The Foundation offers bags of donated, cleaned, and sorted Lego bricks and other items to support their cause. The Charity runs a Lego piece yard sale and auction at BrickFair Virginia for the exhibitors, with basic parts offered at the yard sale and more valuable items offered at the auction.

In 2011, 100 Lego minifigures were donated by Ben Spector to the SladeChild charity, and were offered at the 2011 BrickFair event. In 2012, 275 minifigures were donated by BrickFair to SladeChild, and were offered at the 2012 Virginia BrickFair event. At the 2013 Virginia event, 300 minifigures were handed out to raise money for the charity.

== Private convention ==
The function of the private convention is to provide a venue for adult fans of Lego to display their own Lego creations. The event brings together the online fan community, and helps them to explore and develop their Lego hobby. Activities at the convention include presentations, seminars, round-table discussions, contests, games, door prizes, and many experiences unique to Lego conventions. Each registrant receives a convention packet that includes a personalized name badge made from engraved LEGO bricks, as well as a program of activities, exclusive handouts, and coupons.

Some games and events are held every year due to high appeal and attendance. Speed Build is one of many games usually played at BrickFair conventions. In Speed Build, a team of six players work together to build a large Lego set, using an instruction booklet. Afterwards, the set is broken up into parts, and each participant takes home a part of that set. Lego Bingo is a game that involves winning Lego sets and prizes by showing a winning Bingo board. Parts drafts involve all participants buying a copy of the same set and arriving with it. The sets are then opened and the parts are formed into lots. Everyone takes turns selecting a pile of pieces to bring home and keep. Dirty Brickster involves each participant bringing a wrapped gift. Everyone takes turns grabbing gifts or taking from neighboring participants until the gifts are gone. Lego Hold Em is a poker tournament, Texas hold 'em-style, where the most successful win Lego prizes.

Beginning in 2008, a popular program was conducted at the Potomac Mills Lego store that allowed BrickFair registrants to access the store in an after-hours sale from 9:30 p.m. until midnight. The program featured promotions such as 20 percent off purchases of $150 or more and 50 percent off items with damaged boxes. The program lasted until 2010, when it was discontinued for the 2011 event and remains unavailable.

Notable vendors have included BrickArms, a vendor of Lego minifigure weapons based out of Redmond, Washington. BrickArms has attended and exhibited models since 2008.

== Public exhibition ==
The main focus of the public exhibition is to invite Lego fans of all ages and the general public to view hundreds of hobbyist-built creations and meet their creators. In addition, visitors may watch Lego Mindstorms robot battles or Brickfilms (Lego-themed short films), or have their children build at Stay & Play, a large space with Lego bricks for building and playing. Also available to visitors are the vendors, who sell Lego sets, creations, designs, and individual pieces.

== Locations and dates ==
=== BrickFair NoVa (Chantilly) ===
Dates	Location	Registrants	Attendance	Theme	Charity Donations
August 29–31, 2008	Sheraton Premiere Hotel at Tysons Corner - Vienna, VA	402	10,000	Board Games	US$8,717
August 21–23, 2009	Sheraton Premiere Hotel at Tysons Corner - Vienna, VA	636	7,565	Food & Drink	US$9,619
August 5–8, 2010	Dulles Expo Center (North Hall) - Chantilly, VA	699	19,388	Music	US$22,805
August 4–7, 2011	Dulles Expo Center (South Hall) - Chantilly, VA	945	16,587	NASA	Undisclosed
August 2–5, 2012	Dulles Expo Center (South Hall) - Chantilly, VA	1,044	20,000	Fire	Undisclosed
August 1–4, 2013	Dulles Expo Center (South Hall) - Chantilly, VA	859	14,000	Birds	US$11,700
July 30–August 3, 2014	Dulles Expo Center (South Hall) - Chantilly, VA	853	22,500	Air & Wind	US$26,600
July 29–August 2, 2015	Dulles Expo Center (South Hall) - Chantilly, VA	TBA	TBA	Love	US$22,600
August 3–7, 2016	Dulles Expo Center (South Hall) - Chantilly, VA	TBA	TBA	Myths & Legends	TBA
August 2–6, 2017	Dulles Expo Center (South Hall) - Chantilly, VA	957	10,500	X (Ten)	US$14,000
August 1–5, 2018	Dulles Expo Center (South Hall) - Chantilly, VA	TBD	TBD	Puzzles	TBD
July 31–August 4, 2019	Dulles Expo Center (South Hall) - Chantilly, VA	TBD	TBD	The Moon & Beyond	TBD
Cancelled Due to Covid Pandemic	Dulles Expo Center (South Hall) - Chantilly, VA	TBD	TBD	N/A	TBD
July 28–August 1, 2021	Dulles Expo Center (South Hall) - Chantilly, VA	TBD	TBD	Dinosaurs	TBD
August 3–August 7, 2022	Dulles Expo Center (South Hall) - Chantilly, VA	TBD	TBD	Construction	TBD
August 2–August 6, 2023	Dulles Expo Center (South Hall) - Chantilly, VA	TBD	TBD	TBD	TBD
July 31–August 4, 2024	Dulles Expo Center (South Hall) - Chantilly, VA	TBD	TBD	TBD	TBD
July 30–August 3, 2025	Dulles Expo Center (South Hall) - Chantilly, VA	TBD	TBD	Rock	TBD

=== BrickFair Alabama ===
Dates	Location	Registrants	Attendance	Theme	Charity Donations
January 12–15, 2012	Birmingham Convention Center (East Hall) - Birmingham, AL	200	6,800	Fire	Undisclosed
January 17–20, 2013	Birmingham Convention Center (East Hall 3) - Birmingham, AL	164	8,000	Birds	Undisclosed
January 9–12, 2014	Birmingham Convention Center (East Hall 2 & 3) - Birmingham, AL	166	5,800	Air & Wind	Undisclosed
January 15–18, 2015	Birmingham Convention Center - Birmingham, AL	201	9,400	Love	Undisclosed
January 14–17, 2016	Birmingham Convention Center - Birmingham, AL	238	7,136	Myths & Legends	Undisclosed
January 12–15, 2017	Birmingham Convention Center - Birmingham, AL	219	5,039	X (Ten)	Undisclosed
February 1–4, 2018	Birmingham Convention Center - Birmingham, AL	TBD	TBD	Puzzles	TBD
January 17–20, 2019	Birmingham Jefferson Convention Complex - Birmingham, AL	TBD	TBD	The Moon & Beyond	TBD
January 16–19, 2020	Birmingham Jefferson Convention Complex - Birmingham, AL	TBD	TBD	Dinosaurs	TBD
January 15–16, 2022	Birmingham Jefferson Convention Complex - Birmingham, AL	TBD	TBD	TBD	TBD

=== BrickFair North Carolina ===
Dates	Location	Registrants	Attendance	Theme	Charity Donations
March 21–24, 2019	Park Expo NC - Charlotte, NC	TBA	TBA	The Moon & Beyond	Undisclosed

=== BrickFair New England ===
Dates	Location	Registrants	Attendance	Theme	Charity Donations
May 9–12, 2013	Expo Center of New Hampshire - Manchester, NH	159	2,250	Birds	Undisclosed
May 8–11, 2014	Expo Center of New Hampshire - Manchester, NH	132	4,000	Air & Wind	Undisclosed
April 30–May 3, 2015	Expo Center of New Hampshire - Manchester, NH	133	TBA	Love	Undisclosed
May 19–22, 2016	Royal Plaza Trade Center - Marlboro MA	174	4,400	Myths & Legends	Undisclosed
May 9–12, 2017	Royal Plaza Trade Center - Marlboro MA	197	3,000	X (Ten)	Undisclosed

=== BrickFair New Jersey ===
Dates	Location	Registrants	Attendance	Theme	Charity Donations
October 30–November 2, 2014	Garden State Expo Center - Somerset, NJ	TBA	TBA	Air & Wind	Undisclosed
October 29–November 1, 2015	Garden State Expo Center - Somerset, NJ	TBA	TBA	Love	Undisclosed
October 27–30, 2016	Garden State Expo Center - Somerset, NJ	TBA	TBA	Myths & Legends	Undisclosed
September 21–24, 2017	New Jersey Expo Center - Edison, NJ	TBD	TBD	X (Ten)	TBD
October 31–November 3, 2019	Meadowlands Expo Center - Secaucus, NJ	TBD	TBD	The Moon & Beyond	TBD
September 23–36, 2021	Meadowlands Expo Center - Secaucus, NJ	TBD	TBD	TBD	TBD

== See also ==
- Lego fandom
