= Lego fandom =

Fan community

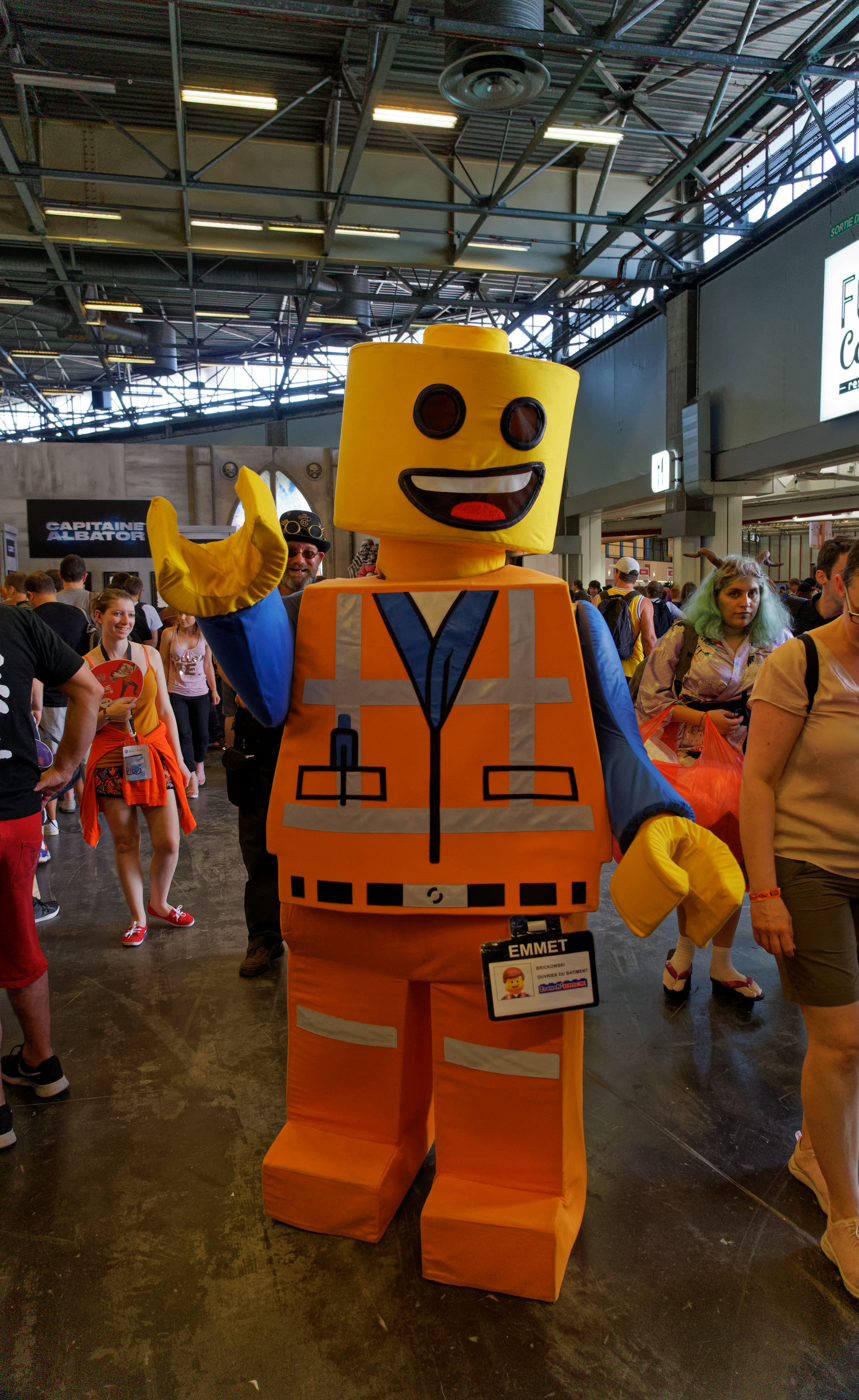
Cosplay of Emmet Brickowski from The Lego Movie (2014)

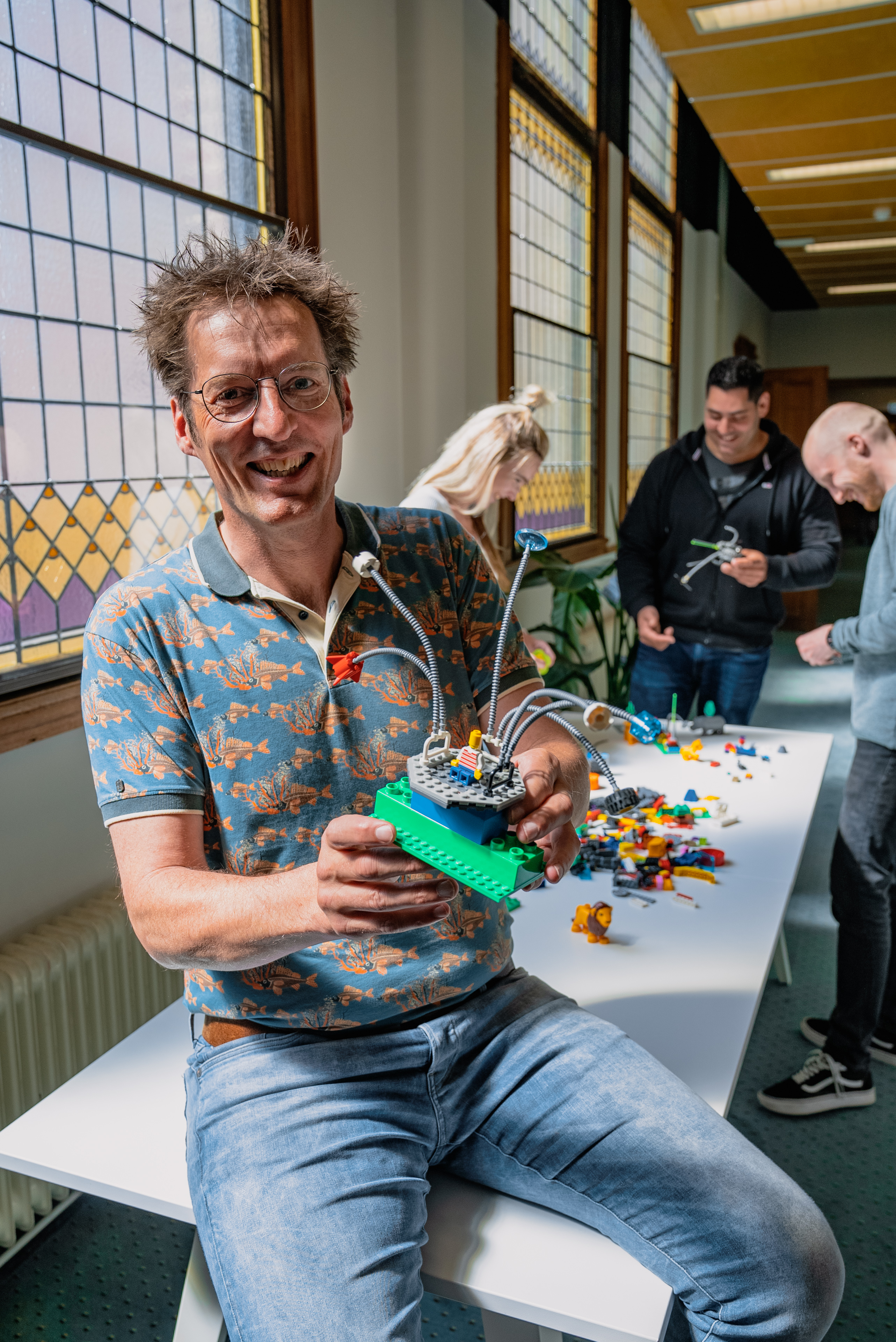
Adult fans of Lego at a workshop event

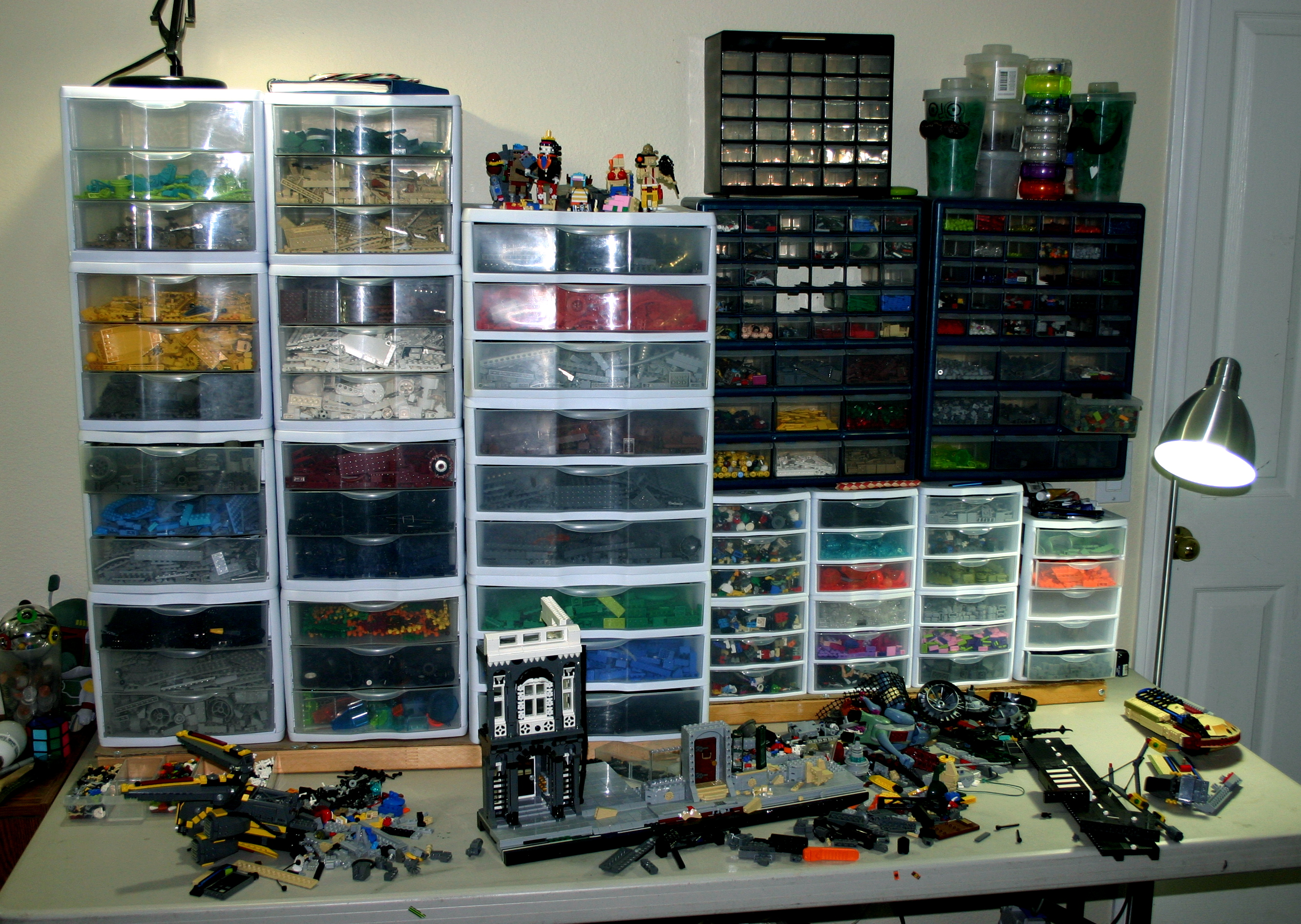
A Lego enthusiast's workspace

Lego fandom is the fan community that exists around Lego toys. While Lego is primarily seen as a children's toy, there are also a significant number of adult fans of Lego, known by the abbreviation AFOL.

== Adult fans of Lego ==
Adult members of the Lego fandom are called "adult fans of Lego," abbreviated as "AFOL". Many AFOLs design complex sets, known as MOCs ("My Own Creation"), sometimes using computer software such as LDraw or MLCAD for their planning. Such sets may be intended for public display during various events, and some have attracted media attention, such as Sean Kenney's model of Yankee Stadium, a six-foot-wide (1.8 m) and five-foot-long (1.5 m) construction of 45,000 pieces created over a period of three years, or Mark Borlase's Star Wars Hoth diorama of 60,000 bricks and four-year construction time. Many AFOLs have dedicated "Lego rooms" in their houses.

Activities of more dedicated AFOLs go beyond creating Lego models, and include attending Lego conventions, participating in online Lego communities, and less often, cosplay, writing fanfiction or drawing fan art.

Large AFOL conventions include events such as Brickworld, BrickFair, or Bricks by the Bay, and AFOL Networking Events.

Many AFOLs self-identify as "geeks" or "nerds". In the United States, during the mid-2010s, most AFOLs were white, college-educated males in their 20s or 30s, although as time goes, the age of the average member of the community is steadily increasing, as more people who grew up with Lego become middle-aged or older. AFOLs usually played with Lego sets as kids, and rediscovered the hobby at some later time in their nostalgic adulthood.

The Lego Group recognizes the AFOL community as an important part of its customer base and maintains a number of outreach programs connecting it to the fan community. In some cases, entire official Lego sets can be seen as intended not for children but for adult fans.

== Activities ==
Activities of Lego fans include creating Lego art, including Great Ball Contraptions: large modular machines which receives small balls from one module and passes them to another module. In 2019 a GBC made of 259 modules was recorded in the Guinness World Records.

== See also ==
- LUGNET
- The Art of the Brick
- Brickfilm
