= Ninjago: Dragons Rising =

Danish–Canadian computer-animated series (2023–present)

- Season 1 Part 1 poster
- Also known as: Ninjago: Dragons' Fury (season 5)
- Genre: Action; Adventure; Science fantasy; Martial arts; Superhero
- Based on: Lego Ninjago
- Voices of: Sam Vincent; Vincent Tong; Michael Adamthwaite; Brent Miller; Andrew Francis; Kelly Metzger; Paul Dobson; Jennifer Hayward; Deven Mack; Sabrina Pitre; Brian Drummond; Kazumi Evans; David A. Kaye; Bethany Brown
- Theme music composer: Jody Tompkins & Theofania Pavli for Pop Sound
- Opening theme: "We Rise" (Note: Three versions of "We Rise" has been used for the opening theme. The opening theme featured original lyrics in Seasons 1–3. The opening theme was remixed in Season 3. A new theme song "The Merged Whip" combining the lyrics from "The Weekend Whip" and "We Rise" in Season 4.) performed by Theofania Pavli
- Composers: Michael Kramer; Jay Vincent; Adam Dib (season 2–present)
- Countries of origin: Canada; Denmark
- Original language: English
- No. of seasons: 4
- No. of episodes: 80

Production
- Executive producers: Jill Wilfert; Keith Malone; Asa Tait (seasons 1–2) (Note: Credited as production executive since Season 3.); Lars Danielsen; Robert May (season 1); Pamela J. Keller; Kevin Burke; Chris "Doc" Wyatt; Josh Scherba; Stephanie Betts; Morgana Duque (season 2–present); Ryan Burns (season 3–present)
- Producers: Jason Cosler (season 1); Ryan Pears
- Running time: 22 minutes
- Production companies: WildBrain Studios; The Lego Group

Original release
- Network: Netflix; Peacock (season 2); The Roku Channel (season 3); Tubi (season 4)
- Release: June 1, 2023 – present

Related
- Ninjago; Legends of Chima; Nexo Knights; Lego Dreamzzz

Ninjago: Dragons Rising is an animated epic-fantasy superhero television series produced by the Vancouver studio of WildBrain and The Lego Group, based on the Lego Ninjago brand of construction toys and the sequel to Ninjago (2011–2022), set several years later. It features the original series' regular voice cast, along with new cast members as new characters.

The first season of the show premiered on Netflix in 2023, with Part 1 on June 1, while Part 2 was released on October 12.

The second season premiered in 2024, with Part 1 on April 4 on Netflix, while Part 2 was released on Peacock on July 25, before it was officially released on October 3 on Netflix.

The third season premiered in 2025, with Part 1 on April 17 on Netflix, while Part 2 was released on The Roku Channel in three separate batches: episodes 11–14 on April 24, episodes 15–18 on April 25, and episodes 19–20 on August 25, before all the episodes were officially released on September 4 on Netflix.

The fourth season premiered in 2026, with Part 1 on April 2 on Netflix, while Part 2 was released on Tubi on July 22, before it was officially released on September 3 on Netflix.

The fifth and final season, subtitled Dragons' Fury, is set to premiere in 2027.

== Synopsis ==
=== Season 1 (2023) ===
==== Part 1 ====
After Crystalized, a phenomenon known as "the Merge" combines Ninjago with the rest of the sixteen realms of creation, introducing new threats, separating the ninja and causing chaotic aftershocks called MergeQuakes. Years later, Lloyd befriends two civilians: Arin, a huge fan of the Ninja, and Arin's best friend Sora, a technopath from the totalitarian kingdom of Imperium. The three are tasked with finding the rest of the scattered ninja and combating the Claws of Imperium, who hunt dragons in order to drain their life force and power their kingdom.

==== Part 2 ====
The ninja, having successfully rescued the dragons trapped in Imperium, set out on a quest to find the three Dragon Cores, powerful artifacts that can stop the MergeQuakes. They split off into three teams: Lloyd and Arin; Nya, Sora and Riyu; Kai and Wyldfyre, while Zane stays behind in the monastery with Alfonzo Frohicky. Together, they search the Merged Lands for the cores, discovering new creatures and even new elemental masters. Empress Beatrix, the oppressive ruler of Imperium, manages to steal the Dragon Cores in order to create a powerful weapon to defeat the ninja for good.

=== Season 2 (2024) ===
==== Part 1 ====
Lloyd begins having distressing visions of a Blood Moon and seeks help from the Source Dragons. He and the ninja are led to Egalt and Rontu, two dragon masters who can teach the ninja a special technique called "Rising Dragon." Deep in the Wyldness, Ras reassembles an ancient clan of warriors known as the Wolf Clan, and revives a dark and corrupted form of Spinjitzu known as Shatterspin. The Wolf Clan prepares for a ritual on the soon-approaching Blood Moon to free an ancient group of evil elemental masters, known as the Forbidden Five, from imprisonment.

==== Part 2 ====
When three Arc Dragons are mysteriously murdered for their crowns of horns, the Source Dragon of Motion tasks the ninja to participate in the ancient and honorable Tournament of the Sources to search for the culprit. Meanwhile, as the ninja fight new Elemental Masters, the Wolf Clan, Nokt of the Forbidden Five, and an amnesiac Jay, Arin begins to wonder about his position in the group after being told by Ras of Master Wu's responsibility for the Merge and the disappearance of Arin's parents.

=== Season 3 (2025) ===
==== Part 1 ====
The Forbidden Five are seeking out five Prismatic Blades across the Merged Lands so as to free Thunderfang, the Shatter Dragon of Chaos, from his imprisonment. Meanwhile, the ninja search for Jay, who lost in the Tournament of the Sources and had vanished, P.I.X.A.L., who went missing after the Merge, and Arin, who left to search for his parents and help Ras reverse the Merge.

==== Part 2 ====
After Sora left with Arin and Ras to help them reverse the Merge, the ninja are seeking to get their teammates back and find Arin's parents, who were initially thought to be dead but are in fact alive. Meanwhile, as Thunderfang plans to destroy all the Merged Lands and become one of the Source Dragons, the ninja must summon the Arc Dragon of Focus to stop him once and for all.

=== Season 4 (2026) ===
==== Part 1 ====
Ras had stranded the ninja in three separate realms after sabotaging and disabling the portal gates connected to each of the Merged Lands. While the ninja seek to reunite and return home, Lloyd, Arin and Euphrasia found themselves in the Whispering Wood, where they encounter its protector, the Arc Dragon of Life, who reveals to Lloyd something he had never known about regarding his destiny as the Green Ninja. Meanwhile, a new threat arises in the form of Elemental Monsters created from corrupted elemental energy. With three of the Source Dragons having withdrawn, the balance in Elemental Powers and the world is now at risk.

==== Part 2 ====
Sometime after Beatrix's failed campaign to retake Imperium, the ninja realized the dangers of the Weapon of Desolation and travels to the Never Kingdoms to destroy it. Meanwhile, the Merged Lands are preparing for an international summit, where each of the lands' respective delegates will gather for talks on uniting the Merged Lands. This is put to the test, however, when the Loyalists revive General Cryptor, an old enemy of the ninja, while they plot to have Beatrix swap minds with her twin-sister Zeatrix so she could take over her body and make another attempt at taking over the Merged Lands, which threatens to derail the summit and crush any possibility of unification.

== Cast and characters ==
=== Main ===
==== Old characters ====
- Sam Vincent as Master Lloyd Montgomery Garmadon, the legendary Green Ninja, the Elemental Master of Life, chosen guardian of Ninjago, and grandson of the First Spinjitzu Master, who remained in Ninjago City to prevent MergeQuakes, train Arin and Sora and rejoined with Kai, Nya, Zane, Cole, P.I.X.A.L. and Jay. He achieved the rank of Master following his successful fight against Egalt and Rontu. He later went through the Ritual of Unrooting in the Whispering Wood as every previous Green Ninja had, becoming its protector. After he stabilized the Weapon of Desolation while re-stabilizing elemental powers, this destroyed his physical body, reducing him to a ghost-like form similar to Master Wu.
- Vincent Tong as Kai, the Red Ninja, the hot-headed Elemental Master of Fire and Nya's brother, who ended up in the Land of Monsters following the Merge where he fought its inhabitants for months. After escaping the Land of Monsters, he later reunited with Lloyd whom he tasked with surveying the Merged Lands to look for the rest of their teammates until he caught up with him and Nya in the Land of Madness and rejoined with Zane, Cole, P.I.X.A.L. and Jay. During their hunt for the Dragon Cores, Kai decided to take Wyldfyre under his wing.
- Michael Adamthwaite as Jay Walker (born Jay Gordon), the Blue Ninja, the Elemental Master of Lightning and Nya's boyfriend, who ended up in the Land of Madness following the Merge where he was captured and forced to partake in illegal gladiatorial fights during which he made a promise to free the other contestants that were also captured. After scaring the Pit-Master with his elemental power, he was taken away by the Administration, who suppress his memories. Now amnesiac, Jay began working for the Administration as its manager for realm reassignment. He eventually left the Administration and was recruited by Ras, only to be cast away following his loss to Nya in the Tournament of the Sources. He became a bounty hunter known as Rogue but later rejoined with Lloyd, Kai, Nya, Zane, Cole and P.I.X.A.L., though still with no memory. He successfully regained his memories with Nya and Kai's help, which allowed him to fully rejoin the ninja. He later returned to the Land of Madness and freed the other gladiatorial contestants, fulfilling his earlier promise.
- Brent Miller as Zane Julien, a Nindroid, the Titanium Ninja and the Elemental Master of Ice, who was stranded in Imperium following the Merge and was kept in suspension for years. He was later awakened by Nya and Kai and rejoined with Lloyd, Cole, P.I.X.A.L. and Jay.
- Andrew Francis as Cole, the Black Ninja and the Elemental Master of Earth, who ended up in the Land of Lost Things following the Merge, helping those who ran away from home. He later rejoined with Lloyd, Kai, Nya, Zane, P.I.X.A.L. and Jay.
- Kelly Metzger as Nya, the Light Blue Ninja, the Elemental Master of Water, Kai's sister, and Jay's girlfriend, who lived with the Craglings in the Land of Madness following the Merge, helping them prevent Earth Dragons from stealing the Craglings' life energy. She later rejoined with Lloyd, Kai, Zane, Cole, P.I.X.A.L. and Jay.
- Paul Dobson as Master Wu, the Ninja's mentor who has lived for thousands of years, Lloyd's uncle and son of the First Spinjitzu Master. He goes missing following the Merge but his teachings live on in Lloyd. While having survived, he took on a spirit form, and it was later revealed that he was responsible for the Merge.
- Jennifer Hayward as P.I.X.A.L., a female Nindroid created by Dr. Cyrus Borg, the head of Borg Industries, a longtime ally of the ninja and Zane's girlfriend, who was stranded in the First Land following the Merge, and like Zane, was kept in suspension for years. She was later awakened and rescued by Zane and rejoined with Lloyd, Kai, Nya, Cole and Jay.

==== New characters ====
- Deven Mack as Arin Nived, a civilian who idolized the Ninja in his youth. He lost his parents after the Merge and somehow managed to teach himself Spinjitzu, an impossible ability to learn without a teacher. He also inadvertently invented Object Spinjitzu. He later learned that Master Wu was responsible for the Merge, causing him to leave the Ninja and join with Ras in hopes of finding his parents and reversing the Merge. He temporarily rejoined the ninja later on and aided them in stopping the Forbidden Five and Thunderfang. Following Thunderfang's demise, Arin rejoined with Ras to find a way to revive his parents, believing that they had died during the Merge. When Ras attempted to have him sacrifice Sora to create Source Dragon Icons, this made Arin turn against him. He eventually learned that his parents are still alive and reunites with them in the Land of Lee before rejoining the ninja again.
- Sabrina Pitre as Sora, known in her past as Ana, a technological engineer originally from Imperium who gained recognition for creating a hard light hologram projection device called the Photac. She defected from Imperium when she found out how cruelly they treated dragons, leading to her parents and classmates shunning her. After the Merge, she befriended Arin and lived in the Crossroads, becoming a mech racer. She became the Elemental Master of Technology after discovering she has technokinetic powers, which were first amplified in the presence of Riyu until she unlocked her True Potential. She later became the winner of the Tournament of the Sources, however, her friendship with Arin crumbled after they had a falling out during the tournament. They later reconciled over the apparent death of Arin's parents. Sora joined with Arin and Ras as they seek to find a way to revive Arin's parents, unaware that they are still alive, which she eventually learned later on. After turning against Ras for attempting to sacrifice her to create Source Dragon Icons, she rejoined the ninja. After helping the ninja defeat Beatrix again, she later reunited and reconciled with her parents.
- Brian Drummond as Riyu, a young dragon from the Tribe of the Mountain Dragons. He was rescued from the Claws of Imperium by Arin, Sora, and Lloyd, and is capable of boosting certain individual's powers in close proximity. Sometime after being separated from the other ninja by Ras, Riyu was inflicted with a lethal disease called the Numbness after being attacked by an elemental monster but was fortunately cured by Sora via turning its energy into an antidote, which allowed the dragon to fundamentally evolve, becoming much larger with the ability to perform martial arts and swordsmanship.
- Kazumi Evans as Wyldfyre, a feral pyrokinetic human and the Elemental Master of Heat who was raised by a dragon, Heatwave, as well as a caregiver robot. After Heatwave was captured by the Claws of Imperium, she sought to rescue him only to be captured as well. After being freed by Lloyd alongside Heatwave, she joined the Ninja in their search for the Dragon Cores, eventually becoming Kai's protégé. During the Tournament of the Sources, she became the girlfriend of Games Master Roby Fengxian, whom she fell in love with in the tournament. She was Ninjago's delegate during the Summit of the Merged Lands and was succeeded by Alfonzo Frohicky.
- David A. Kaye as Fracture "Frak" Slitherbottom, a Constrictai/Venomari hybrid, Arin's childhood best friend, one of Ras' former students, and the Elemental Master of Quake. He joined the Ninja at the end of the Tournament of the Sources after he helped them fight the Wolf Clan, becoming Lloyd's third student.
- Bethany Brown as Euphrasia, a Writer of Destiny and the current Elemental Master of Wind. She was born in the Cloud Kingdom and received the Elemental Power of Wind after the Merge. She chose to hide her powers as a Writer of Destiny, however, with the help of the ninja, she was forced to use them to save her kingdom when it was attacked. This act ultimately triggered a process of modernization in the Cloud Kingdom. She joins the ninja not long after Thunderfang's defeat, assisting them in stopping the Loyalists.

=== Villains ===
==== Season 1 ====
- Nicole Oliver as Empress Beatrix Vespasian-Orus, the power-hungry empress of Imperium who orders the capture of the seven Source Dragons in an effort to conquer the Merged Lands. After her cruel treatment of dragons was exposed, she was deposed and was sent into a MergeQuake rift by Arin, sending her to the Land of Monsters, where she fought against its inhabitants for months before becoming gradually fused with her battle mech, becoming a cybernetic monster. After she escaped from the Land of Monsters, she was rescued by Dr. LaRow and was aided by the Loyalists in reclaiming her throne while also seeking revenge on the ninja for her past defeat. She was defeated again and imprisoned for her crimes. As her recent battle with the ninja had left her comatose, the Loyalists had her swapped minds with her sister Zeatrix so she could take over the Council of the Merged Lands so as to disrupt their peace talks on uniting. She was once again thwarted by the ninja and was switched back into her still-comatose body.
- Brian Drummond as Lord Ras, known in his past as Zeras, an anthropomorphic black and pink tiger from the Wyldness who is physically strong and wields a large hammer (which is later revealed to be the Icon of the Source Dragon of Strength), and answers to a mysterious and unseen "master." When empowered or enraged, his pink markings turn red. He served in Imperium's military, leading the Claws in capturing dragons until he was stripped of his position and imprisoned. He later escapes and becomes the new leader of the Wolf Clan, recruiting Jordana to aid him in bringing back the Forbidden Five before they betrayed him and he was rescued by Arin, who nursed him back to health in exchange for guiding him to his parents' graves and promising to revive them, unaware that they were alive, until Ras attempted to sacrifice Sora to create Source Dragon Icons. He later created another Source Dragon Icon and steals one from the Monastery of Spinjitzu after raiding it. He later imprisoned Wu's spirit, and scattered the Ninja in the Whispering Wood, the Land of Madness (its monastery inside a Quealiche), and the Land of Eternal Dawn. Sometime later, he created a fifth Source Dragon Icon and reforged another Source Dragon Icon he had used in the past. He also manipulated Zilvar Slashclaw into becoming unintentionally responsible for Lloyd's presumed death.
- Giles Panton as Rapton, the field leader of the Claws of Imperium who, after capturing many dragons, helped the Ninja in Beatrix's defeat. He later returned to dragon hunting and became the leader of the Freebooters. He later moved to the Crossroads where he began running his own antiques store.
- Ashleigh Ball as Dr. LaRow, a head scientist of the Advanced Systems Lab working for the Kingdom of Imperium. After Beatrix was overthrown, Dr. LaRow fled from the kingdom and later became the leader of the Loyalists to help Beatrix reclaim her throne. She restored a powerful weapon known as the Weapon of Desolation for Beatrix to use in summoning elemental monsters to aid in her attempt to reclaim her throne. After this was met with failure, Dr. LaRow was arrested and imprisoned for her crimes. Despite her imprisonment, she plotted for the Loyalists to rebuild Cryptor and have Beatrix swapped minds with Zeatrix so she could take over the Council of the Merged Lands.
- Mackenzie Gray as Dorama, a former famous pyro-technician and showman from the Crossroads who helped Beatrix develop technology for capturing dragons. After Beatrix was deposed, he opens a theater institution in the Wyldness and began capturing citizens to force them to be his students. He was stopped by the ninja and Bonzle and was taken away to the authorities. A few months later, he began wreaking havoc on Ninjago City with multiple giant wooden puppets but was stopped by the ninja and was arrested for his crimes.
- Ian Hanlin as Blorko, a Claw Hunter working under Rapton's command, whom he is sarcastic to and always second guesses.
- Vincent Tong as Melvin, an Imperium Guard.
- Deven Mack as a Claw Hunter.
- Maryke Hendrikse as the Lava-Tide Leader, the leader of the Lava-Tides.
- Vincent Tong as Lava-Tide 1.
- Brent Miller as Lava-Tide 2.
- Sabrina Pitre as Howler 1.
- Richard Ian Cox as Howler 2.
- Mark Hildreth as Agent Karit, an agent of the Administration, a large organization that imposes arbitrary rules and bureaucracy on the rest of the Merged Lands.
- Kazumi Evans as Agent Denholt, an Administration Agent.
- Michael Adamthwaite as Agent Roderick Allen, an Administration Agent.
- Rhona Rees as Agent SsssSsss Underwood, a Hypnobrai agent of the Administration.
- Ian Hanlin as Sub-Agent Prentis, an Administration Agent who works at the Department of Reassignment.

==== Season 2 ====
- Ian Hanlin as Cinder, the current Elemental Master of Smoke. He gained the power of Shatterspin from Ras and aided him in the Ritual of the Blood Moon, and later competed on Ras' team in the Tournament of the Sources only to then be imprisoned after aiding the Wolf Clan in attacking the tournament.
- Deven Mack as Nokt, a corrupted anthropomorphic wolf, the co-leader of the Forbidden Five, Rox's brother, one of Zarkt's cousins, and the Elemental Master of Brute Force. He and the rest of the Forbidden Five were imprisoned millennia ago to a space between realms known as the Nether-Space, and was later freed alone by Ras during the Ritual of the Blood Moon. Afterward, he was enslaved by Ras and made to compete in the Tournament of the Sources. He promptly betrayed Ras and colluded with Rox to free the remaining Forbidden Five. He later joins them in collecting the Prismatic Blades in order to free Thunderfang only to be betrayed and have his soul absorbed by him, becoming a ghost in the process. Nokt then aids Thunderfang in his quest to become a Source Dragon, which was a success until the Shatter Dragon was defeated by the Arc Dragon of Focus, causing Nokt's spirit to disappear.
- Emily Tennant as Rox, a corrupted anthropomorphic wolf, the co-leader of the Forbidden Five, Nokt's sister, one of Zarkt's cousins, and the Elemental Master of Fear. She and the rest of the Forbidden Five were imprisoned millennia ago to a space between realms known as the Nether-Space. During the Ritual of the Blood Moon, her spirit escaped the Nether-Space and possessed Jordana, later colluding with Nokt in freeing the remaining Forbidden Five. She led the Forbidden Five in collecting the Prismatic Blades in order to free Thunderfang only to be betrayed and have her soul absorbed by him, becoming a ghost in the process. Rox then aids Thunderfang in his quest to become a Source Dragon, which was a success until the Shatter Dragon was defeated by the Arc Dragon of Focus, causing Rox's spirit to disappear.
- Vincent Tong as Bleckt Fengxian, Roby's uncle, who conspired with Ras to rig the Tournament of the Sources only to be arrested in the end. He later helped the ninja in awakening the Arc Dragon of Focus.

==== Season 3 ====
- Deven Mack as Thunderfang, the Shatter Dragon of Chaos, who is the source of the dark powers possessed by the Forbidden Five, and was imprisoned millennia ago after being defeated by the Arc Dragon of Focus. A great warrior in the legendary war between Oni and Dragons, he believed his victories entitled him to become one of the Source Dragons, but became infuriated when this wish was turned down. After he was sent to the Spectral Lands by Arin, he began absorbing souls in his quest to become a Source Dragon. He was successful at first but was once again defeated by the Arc Dragon of Focus, with aid from Lloyd and Arin, causing Thunderfang to vanish.
- Michael Adamthwaite as Zarkt, a corrupted anthropomorphic melanistic wolf, a member of the Forbidden Five, Nokt and Rox's cousin, and the Elemental Master of Misfortune. He and the rest of the Forbidden Five were imprisoned millennia ago to a space between realms known as the Nether-Space. After failing to escape during the Ritual of the Blood Moon, Zarkt and the other trapped members conspired with their leaders from the Nether-Space of another way to escape, which succeeded. He and the rest of the Forbidden Five went out to collect the Prismatic Blades in order to free Thunderfang only to be betrayed and have his soul absorbed by him, becoming a ghost in the process. Zarkt then aids Thunderfang in his quest to become a Source Dragon, which was a success until the Shatter Dragon was defeated by the Arc Dragon of Focus, causing Zarkt's spirit to disappear.
- Lee Tockar as Drix, a corrupted anthropomorphic insect from Chima, a member of the Forbidden Five, and the Elemental Master of Swarm. He and the rest of the Forbidden Five were imprisoned millennia ago to a space between realms known as the Nether-Space. After failing to escape during the Ritual of the Blood Moon, Drix and the other trapped members conspired with their leaders from the Nether-Space of another way to escape, which succeeded. He and the rest of the Forbidden Five went out to collect the Prismatic Blades in order to free Thunderfang only to be betrayed and have his soul absorbed by him, becoming a ghost in the process. Drix then aids Thunderfang in his quest to become a Source Dragon, which was a success until the Shatter Dragon was defeated by the Arc Dragon of Focus, causing Drix's spirit to disappear.
- Ashleigh Ball as Kur, a corrupted and decayed anthropomorphic jackal, a member of the Forbidden Five, and the Elemental Master of Decay. She and the rest of the Forbidden Five were imprisoned millennia ago to a space between realms known as the Nether-Space. After failing to escape during the Ritual of the Blood Moon, Kur and the other trapped members conspired with their leaders from the Nether-Space of another way to escape, which succeeded. She and the rest of the Forbidden Five went out to collect the Prismatic Blades in order to free Thunderfang only to be betrayed and have her soul absorbed by him, becoming a ghost in the process. Kur then aids Thunderfang in his quest to become a Source Dragon, which was a success until the Shatter Dragon was defeated by the Arc Dragon of Focus, causing Kur's spirit to disappear.
- Adrian Petriw as Klirba, the leader of the Lightning-Tides who also serve as a judge.
- Kelly Sheridan as the Lightning-Tide Defense, a defense attorney for the Lightning-Tides.
- Sabrina Pitre as the Lightning-Tide Prosecutor, a public prosecutor for the Lightning-Tides.
- Adam Nurada as Powerlid, a cyclops from Mysterium who temporarily lived in the South Woods of the First Land.
- Emily Tennant as a Claw Hunter.
- Kira Tozer as Agent Etha, a Merlopian agent of the Administration.

==== Season 4 ====
- Deven Mack as Johnny Courageous, a Loyalist who secretly went undercover as a member of the Explorer's Club.
- Ian Hanlin as Agent Blake Donovan, a corrupt Administration agent who was bribed into capturing Jay and suppressing his memories, making him the reason why Jay was amnesiac in the first place.
- Manuela Sosa as Agent Ramirez, an Administration agent.
- Sam Vincent as the Robo Eliminators, security robots deployed by the Administration to hunt down Jay, Nya, and Kai.
- Sabrina Pitre as the Lead Agent, an Administration Agent tasked with leading the Delta League to respond to a supposedly false report on a monster.
- Bethany Brown as the Lead Loyalist, a Loyalist of high rank who led the search for the Weapon of Desolation in the Land of Madness.
- Deven Mack as the Grand Inquisitor, an undercover Loyalist deployed into Umbrasilvis to look for the Tree of Burdens alongside Johnny Courageous.
- Sam Vincent as Enemy Lloyd, one of Lloyd's metaphysical representations during his Ritual of Unrooting, representing the mistakes, doubts, and internal conflict within him since he became a master.
- Ian Hanlin as Wally, an undercover Loyalist who worked as the assistant of Dr. Cyrus Borg.
- Richard Newman as General Cryptor, a nindroid and an old enemy of the ninja. While his soul originally remained in the Spectral Lands, his schematics were used by the Loyalists to rebuild him. Following his revival, he assumed leadership over the Loyalists and sought to disrupt the peace talks at the Summit of the Merged Lands to ensure Beatrix's conquest of the Merged Lands. He later transferred his soul into the Nindroid MechDragon to combat the ninja but was defeated by Wyldfyre while the MechDragon was destroyed.
- Jason Simpson as William Yards, the owner of William Yards Pool and Billiards and a mob boss in Ninjago City.
- Andrew McNee as the Pit-Master, a small monster who was the ringmaster of an illegal gladiatorial arena in the Land of Madness, known to kidnap people to force them to partake in gladiator fights. In the past, he had captured Libber, the former Elemental Master of Lightning, who used her elemental power to escape, leaving him fearful of her power. Many years later, he had an encounter with her son Jay. This leads him to bribe Agent Donovan into capturing him and erasing his memories, making the Pit-Master (alongside Donovan) fully responsible for Jay being amnesiac in the first place.
- Alessandro Juliani as the Weapon of Desolation, a primordial, sentient, and evil scepter of cosmic power created by the essence of Ras' master. It was capable of affecting, damaging, manipulating, and even corrupting Elemental Powers by controlling imbalanced and unstable Source Energy.

==== Season 5: Dragons' Fury ====
- Vincent Tong as Evil Kai, a dark counterpart of Kai, representing his inner evil.
- Michael Adamthwaite as Evil Jay, a dark counterpart of Jay, representing his inner evil.
- Andrew Francis as Evil Cole, a dark counterpart of Cole, representing his inner evil.
- Brent Miller as Evil Zane, a dark counterpart of Zane, representing his inner evil.
- Kelly Metzger as Evil Nya, a dark counterpart of Nya, representing her inner evil.

=== Minor ===
- Brian Drummond as Barry Nived, Arin's father, who disappeared in the Merge with his wife and was thought to be dead until it was later revealed that he is still alive but had been moved by the Administration to the Land of Lee. After he and his wife reunited with Arin, he moved into the Monastery of Spinjitzu to live with the ninja.
- Kelly Sheridan as Jenny Nived, Arin's mother, who disappeared in the Merge with her husband and was thought to be dead until it was later revealed that she is still alive but had been moved by the Administration to the Land of Lee. After she and her husband reunited with Arin, she moved into the Monastery of Spinjitzu to live with the ninja.
- Kelly Sheridan as Kreel, a citizen from Mysterium who had moved to the Crossroads and is the owner of Kreel's Junkyard. She is a mech racer with a crew of Whack Rats. She was also a co-host of the Crossroads Crosstalk podcast.
- Kelly Sheridan as Gayle Gossip, an anchorwoman and news reporter working for the NGTV network. She is amongst the many inhabitants of Ninjago to have survived the Merge.
- Andrew McNee as Alfonzo Elias Frohicky, an anthropomorphic frog from the Wyldness that used to live in the Crossroads and organized many events, including races, festivals and competitions. His friends from the Crossroads, Arin and Sora offered for him to stay at the Monastery of Spinjitzu to help Lloyd maintain it as an Assistant Monastery Keeper. Despite having troubles with this job at first, he became fond of it and decided to stay and help the ninja in this way. He was Ninjago's delegate during the Summit of the Merged Lands, succeeding Wyldfyre.
- Aidan Drummond as Percival "Percy" Tartigrade, the leader of the Imperium Teen Resistance Force and Senator of Imperium. He was Imperium's delegate and host of the Summit of the Merged Lands.
- Jason Simpson as Sora's father, whom she disowned when she reached her true potential. He joined the Loyalists after he and his wife won't have Sora as their daughter anymore. He later reconciled with Sora.
- Kathleen Barr as Sora's mother, whom she disowned when she reached her true potential. She joined the Loyalists after she and her husband won't have Sora as their daughter anymore. She later reconciled with Sora.
- Peter Kelamis as Geoder "Geo", the Elemental Master of Fusion and a member of the Finders. He is a hybrid of Munce and Geckles, which led to him being rejected by both tribes due to their historical rivalry. Geo eventually ended up in the Land of Lost Things where he encountered and joined the Finders, later forming a close bond with Cole.
- Michelle Creber as Bonzle, a spell made mortal being, who has assumed the form of a skeleton while her true form is a magical orb. She was originally created by Gandalaria to seal away the Forbidden Five after they were defeated by Egalt and Rontu. Once this task was accomplished, she wandered the realms aimlessly for eons, until she met Wu and he encouraged her to take a physical form.
- Vincent Tong as Fritz, a Formling from the Never Kingdoms who can turn into a raven and is a member of the Finders.
- Sabrina Pitre as Spitz, a young Hypnobrai and a member of the Finders.
- Brian Drummond as Lobbo, a robot living in the Crossroads who owns Lobbo's Totally Rad Arcade, Lobbo-Lobbo. He was also a co-host of the Crossroads Crosstalk podcast.
- Andrew Francis as Master Egalt, a dragon and legendary warrior who, alongside Rontu, defeated the Forbidden Five and banished them to the Nether-Space millennia ago. He taught the Rising Dragon Technique to the ninja. He had contracted the Wasting Sickness and eventually died from it sometime after Thunderfang was sent to the Spectral Lands. Following his passing, his spirit came to reside in the Spectral Lands as a ghost.
- Kazumi Evans as Master Rontu, a dragon, legendary warrior, and Egalt's companion. She attempted to teach Spinjitzu to Sora and Arin, and now focuses on training Riyu.
- Paul Dobson as the Source Dragon of Energy, one of the seven Source Dragons. Like the rest of his kind, he is an immensely powerful being. However, during his confinement under the hands of Ras, his dominion over the realms was nullified and he was compelled to provide energy to the Kingdom of Imperium while being kept incarcerated. After Beatrix was deposed, Lloyd freed the Source Dragon of Energy. He remained on the Council of Sources after the ninja awakened the Arc Dragon of Focus without the council's consent to fight Thunderfang.
- Niah Davis as the Source Dragon of Life, one of the seven Source Dragons. They left the Council of Sources after the ninja awakened the Arc Dragon of Focus without the council's consent to fight Thunderfang.
- Diana Kaarina as the Source Dragon of Motion, one of the seven Source Dragons. She appeared to the Ninja and instructed them to participate in the Tournament of the Sources. She later gifted Lloyd a Source Dragon Icon that allows him to summon her once in a time of need. She remained on the Council of Sources after the ninja awakened the Arc Dragon of Focus without the council's consent to fight Thunderfang.
- Michael Adamthwaite as the Source Dragon of Strength, one of the seven Source Dragons. He left the Council of Sources after the ninja awakened the Arc Dragon of Focus without the council's consent to fight Thunderfang.
- Marci T. House as the Source Dragon of Flow, one of the seven Source Dragons. They remained on the Council of Sources after the ninja awakened the Arc Dragon of Focus without the council's consent to fight Thunderfang.
- Kathleen Barr as the Source Dragon of Focus, one of the seven Source Dragons. She left the Council of Sources after the ninja awakened the Arc Dragon of Focus without the council's consent to fight Thunderfang.
- Ian Hanlin as Master Suetonius, the leader of the Writers of Destiny and the current Master Writer of the Cloud Kingdom. He was the Cloud Kingdom's delegate during the Summit of the Merged Lands.
- Aidan Drummond as Marcus, one of the Writers of Destiny.
- Tabitha St. Germain as Gandalaria, the high sorceress of Mysterium. She created Bonzle to enlist the Dragon Masters in their quest to defeat the Forbidden Five.
- Brian Drummond as Fedulian, a Merlopian that owns an antiques shop in the Crossroads.
- Sabrina Pitre as Hantro, a Hypnobrai that lives in Ninjago City. She supplies Fedulian's antiques shop.
- Bill Newton as Intelligent George, an influencer in the Merged Lands that makes theories and talks about people who were lost in the Merge.
- Adrian Petriw as Fugi-Dove (born Lloyd), a bird-like former criminal.
- Michael Antonakos as the Mechanic, a well-known professional criminal and a longtime adversary of the ninja.
- Diana Kaarina as Jordana, a young scientist who believes herself to be Sora's rival. She managed to extract raw Source Dragon energy for Beatrix and Ras' master. She was possessed by Rox during the Ritual of the Blood Moon, but was later freed.
- Mark Hildreth as Arrakore, a djinn and one of the few known inhabitants of Djinjago to escape from its destruction. After having his hope restored, he restored and eventually expanded his home realm, harnessing his wish magic once more. He has a Djinjagan dragon friend named Zanth, who was formerly captured by the Claws of Imperium and nicknamed "Sora", whom Ana would use to change her identity. He was Djinjago's delegate during the Summit of the Merged Lands.
- Deven Mack as Gus, a resident of the Crossroads.
- David Kaye as Sir Reginald "Reggie" Slitherbottom, Frak's father and an archaeologist who is a member of the Explorers' Club, being its first Serpentine member.
- Lee Tockar as Dr. Cyrus Borg, the head of Borg Industries and the creator of P.I.X.A.L..
- Richard Newman as the Spirit of the Temple, the spirit guardian of the Temple of the Dragon Cores.
- Vincent Tong as Mr. Koenig, Sora and Jordana's former school teacher.
- Richard Ian Cox as the Bone King, the ruler of the Greenbone Warriors and King of the Underworld prior to Samukai.
- Kelly Metzger as a Bone Guard, one of the Greenbone Warriors.
- Kelly Sheridan as a Bone Warrior, one of the Greenbone Warriors.
- Richard Ian Cox as the Greenbone Leader, a general of the Greenbone Warriors in the Underworld.
- Kelly Metzger as a Re-Awakened trafficker.
- Joanne Wilson as the caregiver bot who took care of Wyldfyre.
- Mark Hildreth as King Crag-Nor, the ruler of the Land of Madness and the King of the Craglings. He was the Land of Madness' delegate during the Summit of the Merged Lands.
- Jason Simpson as Dale, a farmer and mechanic from an unknown ocean village.
- Adam Nurada as the ocean gang leader, an unnamed Merlopian pirate that leads the ocean gang.
- Brenda Crichlow as the Matriarch of the Mountain Dragons, an Arc Dragon of matriarch rank who holds the position of leadership within a herd of Mountain Dragons. She was killed by Nokt and Rox, who was possessing Jordana's body, so they could use her dragon crown to open the portal to the Nether-Space. The Matriarch is survived by her daughter Eridany, who succeeded her mother as the next leader of their herd.
- Kathleen Barr as the Arc Dragon of Focus, an Arc Dragon who is the mortal avatar of the Source Dragon of Focus and the champion of the Source Dragons, who defeated Thunderfang in the past. It was awakened from its slumber by the ninja in the present to defeat Thunderfang once more. Once this was accomplished, it resumed its slumber.
- Niah Davis as the Arc Dragon of Life, an Arc Dragon who is the mortal avatar of the Source Dragon of Life and the protector of the Whispering Wood.
- Andrew McNee as Gulch, the Geckles' Chancellor.
- Ben Toth as a boy, who was at the ninja's memorial tent during the Crossroads Carnival.
- Abigail Journey Oliver as a girl, who was at the ninja's memorial tent during the Crossroads Carnival.
- Tabitha St. Germain as Tox, the Elemental Master of Poison and a longtime ally of the ninja.
- Ian Hanlin as Mr. Pale, the Elemental Master of Light and a longtime ally of the ninja.
- Vincent Tong as Ray, the former Elemental Master of Fire and the father of Kai and Nya.
- Ryan Beil as Roby Fengxian, the Games Master for the Tournament of the Sources and Wyldfyre's boyfriend.
- Paul Dobson as Zur, a Devonian and the Elemental Master of Reflex. He was said to be ruthless, but this was a misconception as his kind are actually shy yet known for their kindness. He befriended Wyldfyre and helped her solve Bleckt's journal to learn of his efforts to rig the Tournament of the Sources.
- Vincent Tong as Zarkar, a member of the Tiger Tribe, an Elemental Master, and the ancestor of Ras.
- Alessandro Juliani as Zilvar Slashclaw, a warrior from the Tiger Tribe. He was held prisoner in the Land of Madness, being forced to partake in illegal gladiatorial fights until he was freed by the ninja. After his liberation, he was manipulated by Ras and corrupted by the Weapon of Desolation into becoming unintentionally responsible for Lloyd's death, leaving him guilt-ridden after being freed from his corruption.
- Kelly Metzger as Mei, a member of the Tiger Tribe, the caretaker of the tribe's tiger cubs and the mate of Zilvar Slashclaw. She was killed when the Wyldness was struck by catastrophic tremors.
- Deven Mack as Chef Grab-Barg, a Mucoid chef who has a rivalry with Arin.
- Brian Drummond as Tope-Epot, a Mucoid and a citizen of the Crossroads.
- Garry Chalk as Zant-Tanz, the Elemental Master of Plants, the acting general of the Mucoid Warriors, and the supreme leader of the Mother Garden. He participated in the Tournament of Sources, but was expelled after being framed for a covert attack on the Ninja, Ras, and Zur.
- Ron Halder as Emperor Levo Vespasian-Orus, the emperor of the Kingdom of Imperium and the Elemental Master of Shockwave prior to Zeatrix. He was killed by Beatrix and Ras in an effort for Beatrix to become Empress.
- Nicole Oliver as Zeatrix Vespasian-Orus, Beatrix's twin sister and the current Elemental Master of Shockwave, who was banished from Imperium so that Beatrix could take the throne, leading to the former becoming embittered and vengeful. She participated in the Tournament of the Sources, where she ruthlessly attacked Lloyd in retaliation for her loss and was effectively banned from the tournament as a result. She later sought revenge on Ras for aiding Beatrix, but redeemed herself when she warns the ninja of the Loyalists' plot to disrupt the Summit of the Merged Lands. Zeatrix was later captured and forcibly swapped minds with Beatrix, leaving her trapped in her sister's comatose body. She was later saved by the ninja and her mind was swapped back into her original body.
- Deven Mack as SpinjitzuForDays99, an influencer and a fan of the ninja.
- Diana Kaarina as NinjaFanInfinity, an influencer and a fan of the ninja.
- Colin Murdock as Ed Walker, the adoptive father of Jay, the husband of Edna Walker, and the owner of Ed & Edna's Mechs N Motors, which was formerly a junk business but has been converted into a mech dealership in response to a decrease in junk demand.
- Jillian Michaels as Edna Walker, the adoptive mother of Jay, the wife of Ed Walker, and the co-owner of Ed & Edna's Mechs N Motors, which was formerly a junk business but has been converted into a mech dealership in response to a decrease in junk demand.
- Tabitha St. Germain as Zazkzaz, a Mucoid merchant and an ally of the Craglings.
- Brian Drummond as the Security Bots, androids created by Gerard Gearhead. They served as the security personnel for the City of Temples and sometimes act as medics. Following the recent Tournament of the Sources, they were reprogrammed to function as tour guides for the city.
- Andrew Francis as Morro, a ghost, the former Elemental Master of Wind and Guardian of the Spectral Lands. He was the Spectral Lands' delegate during the Summit of the Merged Lands.
- Paul Dobson as Koji, the husband of Ume and the father of Aru.
- Kathleen Barr as Aru, a young boy and a fan of the ninja. He is the son of Koji and Ume.
- Sam Vincent as Leaf Blade, a Mountain Dragon who is Eridany's regent until she comes of age.
- Brian Drummond as Kruncha, a Skulkin.
- Brian Drummond as Nuckal, a Skulkin.
- Alan Marriott as Dareth Brown, the self-proclaimed Brown Ninja who owns Laughy's Karaoke Bar and a longtime ally of the ninja.
- Adam Trask as Tyr, the leader of the Dragonian tribe in the Storm Village. He was the First Land's delegate during the Summit of the Merged Lands.
- Kazumi Evans as Old Lady Dragonian 1.
- Kathleen Barr as Old Lady Dragonian 2.
- Brian Drummond as a Dragonian Hunter.
- Michael Daingerfield as Elway, an inhabitant of the Community of Lee. He had his suspicions about Lee until the latter caught on to it and brainwashed him.
- Michael Adamwaithe as a Villager.
- Jay Brazeau as the Pontifex Magicus Ex Nihilo, the leader of the wizards in Mysterium and Kreel's father. He was Mysterium's delegate during the Summit of the Merged Lands. While voiced by Jay Brazeau in Season 3, he is voiced by Alessandro Juliani in Season 4.
- Sam Vincent as Pilly-Wig, a Magic-Tide that owns the Crystal Ball Repair Store in Abracalabria.
- Jay Brazeau as the Wizard Guard, an unnamed wizard from Mysterium.
- Andrew Francis as the Monster Skull, a massive skeleton monster providing a passage to the Underworld to those who are able to defeat it.
- Sebastian Johansson as Lee, the sole inhabitant of the Land of Lee, which is named after him. He has the ability to duplicate himself. Being the ruler of an artificial underground community, he brainwashes the subdivision's inhabitants into believing that he is perfect. Lee reforms and he confessed the truth, allowing the people to leave. He did it with the peace of mind of knowing that his true friends would remain by his side, making sure that he would never be alone again, just like Sora told him. He was the Land of Lee's delegate during the Summit of the Merged Lands.
- Rebecca Shoichet as a captain.
- Paul Dobson as a Castaway.
- Andrew McNee as a Partygoer.
- Tabitha St. Germain as the coconut copy, a sentient coconut that serves as a magical backup copy of Gandalaria, who designed it to preserve the essence of who she is, ensuring that her traits and characteristics remain intact, even in the event of a mindwipe.
- Jillian Michaels as Young Lloyd, one of Lloyd's metaphysical representations during his Ritual of Unrooting, representing his bratty past self prior to joining the ninja.
- Jillian Michaels as Tween Lloyd, one of Lloyd's metaphysical representations during his Ritual of Unrooting, representing the age he skipped over due to the Tomorrow's Tea.
- Sabrina Pitre as Acolyte 1.
- Kazumi Evans as Acolyte 2.
- Brian Drummond as Dr. Gweeg, an anthropomorphic frog, a friend of Mr. Frohicky and a member of the Explorer's Club. He was the Wyldness' delegate during the Summit of the Merged Lands.
- Kelly Metzger as Freya, a resident of Umbrasilvis.
- Paul Dobson as Cecil Putnam, an archaeologist and the manager of the Explorer's Club.
- Niah Davis as Rowan Rockspine, a human member of the Explorer's Club.
- Ashleigh Ball as Seafoam Green, a Merlopian member of the Explorer's Club.
- Tabitha St. Germain as Akita, a Formling from the Never Kingdoms who can turn into a wolf. She was the Never Kingdoms' delegate during the Summit of the Merged Lands.
- Alessandro Juliani as Beniro, a Formling from the Never Kingdoms who can turn into a fox and Akita's fiancé.
- Patricia Drake as Sorla, an Ice Fisher from the Never Kingdoms.
- Kathleen Barr as the Bone Regent, the regent of the Greenbone Warriors during the Summit of the Merged Lands. She was initially skeptical of the peace agreement to unite the Merged Lands, but supported it after seeing the young ninja risk their lives fighting Cryptor and the Loyalists that sabotaged the Summit of the Merged Lands. She was the Underworld's delegate during the Summit of the Merged Lands.
- Andrew Francis as Baron Frye, the Grand Chancellor of Umbrasilvis. He was Umbrasilvis' delegate during the Summit of the Merged Lands.
- Fiona Hogan as Daidan, a dragon living in the Land of Monsters. She had lost her child to one of the many monsters living in the former realm, which left her embittered and vengeful, with a grey view of life. While voiced by Fiona Hogan in Ninjago Legends: Monstrosity, she is voiced by Kazumi Evans in Kai's Monstrous Journey.
- Ian Hanlin as Rusty, a sentient mech empowered by fire. After failing to protect his master, a former Elemental Master of Fire, who was transformed into a centipede-like monster, he vowed to never again fail another Elemental Master of Fire. After being rescued by Kai, Rusty became his companion throughout his journey in the Land of Monsters until he sacrificed himself to save Kai and Daidan from a sea monster known as a Gimon-Ogu.
- Vincent Tong as Bolsen, a bounty hunter who got stranded in the Land of Monsters and became a pawn of the Queen of Monsters.
- Vincent Tong as Fuzz, an insect living in the Land of Monsters, who accompanied Kai and Daidan through the former realm until it was later revealed that he is the son of the Queen of the Monsters and was actually only luring Kai to her so he could be eaten.
- Kazumi Evans as the Queen of Monsters, a giant, monstrous insect living in the Land of Monsters who is the mother of Fuzz. She was later slain by Kai and Bolsen.
- Ian Hanlin as the Fire Master, an Elemental Master of Fire who was Rusty's original master. He was transformed into a centipede-like monster after Rusty failed to protect him. With aid from Kai, Rusty slew his master to end his suffering.
- Sabrina Pitre as Gabby, a NGTV reporter.
- Adrian Petriw as Scott, a mechanic who used to be trapped in the arcade game Prime Empire as its first player in the past before he was released back into the real world thirty years later. Sometime in the future, when Ninjago City was attacked by a colossal serpent called a Devourer, this forced him to flee to safety before he was rescued by the Ninja.
- Brian Drummond as Runt, an Oni warrior from the First Land who was enhanced with dark magic by the Diviner, giving him the ability to mutate into a larger form. He fought Cole only to be killed at his hands.
- Brian Drummond as the Diviner, an Oni diviner from the First Land. He captured Fritz and empowers the Runt through a dark ritual before he was stopped and killed by Cole.

== Episodes ==
=== Series overview ===
Season	Subtitle	Episodes	Originally released	
Season	Subtitle	Episodes	First released	Last released
1	N/A	20	June 1, 2023	October 12, 2023
2	N/A	20	April 4, 2024	July 25, 2024 (Peacock); October 3, 2024 (Netflix)
3	N/A	20	April 17, 2025	August 25, 2025 (Roku); September 4, 2025 (Netflix)
4	N/A	20	April 2, 2026	July 22, 2026 (Tubi); September 3, 2026 (Netflix)
5	Dragons' Fury	20	2027	

=== Season 1 (2023) ===
No. overall	No. in season	Title	Directed by	Written by	Original release date
Part 1
1	1	"The Merge"	Daniel Ife	Kevin Burke & Chris "Doc" Wyatt	June 1, 2023
2	2	"The Merge"	Shane Poettcker	Kevin Burke & Chris "Doc" Wyatt	June 1, 2023
3	3	"Crossroads Carnival"	Daniel Ife	Hanah Lee Cook	June 1, 2023
4	4	"Beyond Madness"	Shane Poettcker	Kevin Burke & Chris "Doc" Wyatt	June 1, 2023
5	5	"Writers of Destiny"	Daniel Ife	Kevin Burke & Chris "Doc" Wyatt	June 1, 2023
6	6	"Return to Imperium"	Shane Poettcker	Liz Hara	June 1, 2023
7	7	"Mindless Beasts"	Daniel Ife	Eugene Son	June 1, 2023
8	8	"I Will Be the Danger"	Shane Poettcker	Kevin Burke & Chris "Doc" Wyatt	June 1, 2023
9	9	"The Calm Inside"	Daniel Ife	Kevin Burke & Chris "Doc" Wyatt	June 1, 2023
10	10	"The Battle of the Second Monastery"	Shane Poettcker	Kevin Burke & Chris "Doc" Wyatt	June 1, 2023
Part 2
11	11	"The Temple of the Dragon Cores"	Daniel Ife	Kevin Burke & Chris "Doc" Wyatt	October 12, 2023
12	12	"Gangs of the Sea"	Shane Poettcker	Eugene Son	October 12, 2023
13	13	"Wyldly Inappropriate"	Daniel Ife	Liz Hara	October 12, 2023
14	14	"The Last Djinn"	Shane Poettcker	Hanah Lee Cook	October 12, 2023
15	15	"They Call It Doom"	Daniel Ife	Kevin Burke & Chris "Doc" Wyatt	October 12, 2023
16	16	"Land of Lost Things"	Shane Poettcker	Glen Lakin	October 12, 2023
17	17	"The Administration"	Daniel Ife	Eugene Son	October 12, 2023
18	18	"Absolute Power"	Shane Poettcker	Hanah Lee Cook	October 12, 2023
19	19	"We Are All Dragons"	Daniel Ife	Liz Hara	October 12, 2023
20	20	"The Power Within"	Shane Poettcker	Kevin Burke & Chris "Doc" Wyatt	October 12, 2023

=== Season 2 (2024) ===
No. overall	No. in season	Title	Directed by	Written by	Original release date
Part 1
21	1	"The Blood Moon"	Daniel Ife	Kevin Burke & Chris "Doc" Wyatt	April 4, 2024
22	2	"Shattered Dreams"	Allan Phan & Shane Poettcker	Liz Hara	April 4, 2024
23	3	"Beyond the Phantasm Cave"	Daniel Ife	Tanya Yuson	April 4, 2024
24	4	"Force From the East"	Shane Poettcker & Allan Phan	Hanah Lee Cook	April 4, 2024
25	5	"The Spell at the Waterfall"	Daniel Ife	Kevin Burke & Chris "Doc" Wyatt	April 4, 2024
26	6	"To Mysterium"	Shane Poettcker	Eugene Son	April 4, 2024
27	7	"Fugitives From Madness"	Daniel Ife	Kevin Burke & Chris "Doc" Wyatt	April 4, 2024
28	8	"Secrets of the Wyldness"	Shane Poettcker	Liz Hara	April 4, 2024
29	9	"The Forest of Spirits"	Daniel Ife	Hanah Lee Cook	April 4, 2024
30	10	"Rising Ninja"	Shane Poettcker	Kevin Burke & Chris "Doc" Wyatt	April 4, 2024
Part 2
31	11	"The Shape of Motion"	Daniel Ife	Kevin Burke & Chris "Doc" Wyatt	July 25, 2024 (Peacock); October 3, 2024 (Netflix)
32	12	"Enter the City of Temples"	Shane Poettcker	Liz Hara	July 25, 2024 (Peacock); October 3, 2024 (Netflix)
33	13	"They Gather for the Feast"	Daniel Ife	Kevin Burke & Chris "Doc" Wyatt	July 25, 2024 (Peacock); October 3, 2024 (Netflix)
34	14	"Inside the Maze"	Shane Poettcker	Eugene Son	July 25, 2024 (Peacock); October 3, 2024 (Netflix)
35	15	"United We Fall"	Daniel Ife	Tanya Yuson	July 25, 2024 (Peacock); October 3, 2024 (Netflix)
36	16	"Truth and Lies"	Shane Poettcker	Kevin Burke & Chris "Doc" Wyatt	July 25, 2024 (Peacock); October 3, 2024 (Netflix)
37	17	"The Sword Shatters"	Daniel Ife	Glen Lakin	July 25, 2024 (Peacock); October 3, 2024 (Netflix)
38	18	"Clues and Suspects"	Shane Poettcker	Liz Hara	July 25, 2024 (Peacock); October 3, 2024 (Netflix)
39	19	"The Final Game"	Daniel Ife	Eugene Son	July 25, 2024 (Peacock); October 3, 2024 (Netflix)
40	20	"Elements of Betrayal"	Shane Poettcker	Kevin Burke & Chris "Doc" Wyatt	July 25, 2024 (Peacock); October 3, 2024 (Netflix)

=== Season 3 (2025) ===
No. overall	No. in season	Title	Directed by	Written by	Original release date
Part 1
41	1	"The Missing"	Daniel Ife	Kevin Burke & Chris "Doc" Wyatt	April 17, 2025
42	2	"The Ultimate Object of Admiration"	Shane Poettcker	Liz Hara	April 17, 2025
43	3	"The Spectral Lands"	Daniel Ife	Hanah Lee Cook	April 17, 2025
44	4	"The Great Zane Robbery"	Shane Poettcker	Eugene Son	April 17, 2025
45	5	"I Alone Can Save Them"	Daniel Ife	Kevin Burke & Chris "Doc" Wyatt	April 17, 2025
46	6	"Fallen Wishes"	Shane Poettcker	Liz Hara	April 17, 2025
47	7	"Their Draconic Majesty's Request"	Daniel Ife	Eugene Son	April 17, 2025
48	8	"Crashing Together"	Shane Poettcker	Glen Lakin	April 17, 2025
49	9	"Chaos Unchained"	Daniel Ife	Kevin Burke & Chris "Doc" Wyatt	April 17, 2025
50	10	"The Shatter Dragon"	Shane Poettcker	Kevin Burke & Chris "Doc" Wyatt	April 17, 2025
Part 2
51	11	"The Hollow Ones"	Daniel Ife	Kevin Burke & Chris "Doc" Wyatt	April 24, 2025 (Roku); September 4, 2025 (Netflix)
52	12	"Human Resources"	Shane Poettcker	Liz Hara	April 24, 2025 (Roku); September 4, 2025 (Netflix)
53	13	"Between You and Lee"	Daniel Ife	Eugene Son	April 24, 2025 (Roku); September 4, 2025 (Netflix)
54	14	"Casket of Bones"	Shane Poettcker	Kevin Burke & Chris "Doc" Wyatt	April 24, 2025 (Roku); September 4, 2025 (Netflix)
55	15	"The Screaming Earth"	Daniel Ife	Glen Lakin	April 25, 2025 (Roku); September 4, 2025 (Netflix)
56	16	"Under the Light of a Mechanical Moon"	Shane Poettcker	Kevin Burke & Chris "Doc" Wyatt	April 25, 2025 (Roku); September 4, 2025 (Netflix)
57	17	"The Vault of Focus"	Daniel Ife	Eugene Son	April 25, 2025 (Roku); September 4, 2025 (Netflix)
58	18	"For Whom the Bell Tolls"	Shane Poettcker	Liz Hara	April 25, 2025 (Roku); September 4, 2025 (Netflix)
59	19	"When Doves Cry"	Daniel Ife	Glen Lakin	August 25, 2025 (Roku); September 4, 2025 (Netflix)
60	20	"Chaos Reigns"	Shane Poettcker	Kevin Burke & Chris "Doc" Wyatt	August 25, 2025 (Roku); September 4, 2025 (Netflix)

=== Season 4 (2026) ===
No. overall	No. in season	Title	Directed by	Written by	Original release date
Part 1
61	1	"The Whispering Wood"	Daniel Ife	Kevin Burke & Chris "Doc" Wyatt	April 2, 2026
62	2	"The Lean of a Tree"	Shane Poettcker	Glen Lakin	April 2, 2026
63	3	"Tonight We Hunt Monsters"	Daniel Ife	Eugene Son	April 2, 2026
64	4	"A Wonder of the Merged Lands"	Shane Poettcker	Kevin Burke & Chris "Doc" Wyatt	April 2, 2026
65	5	"Seed and Soil"	Daniel Ife	Kevin Burke & Chris "Doc" Wyatt	April 2, 2026
66	6	"Just Under the Surface"	Shane Poettcker	Kevin Burke & Chris "Doc" Wyatt	April 2, 2026
67	7	"The Grand Inquisition"	Daniel Ife	Glen Lakin	April 2, 2026
68	8	"Dying to Live"	Shane Poettcker	Liz Hara	April 2, 2026
69	9	"The Heartbeat of all the Realms"	Daniel Ife	Eugene Son	April 2, 2026
70	10	"Birthright"	Shane Poettcker	Kevin Burke & Chris "Doc" Wyatt	April 2, 2026
Part 2
71	11	"Monster in the Monastery"	Daniel Ife	Kevin Burke & Chris "Doc" Wyatt	July 22, 2026 (Tubi); September 3, 2026 (Netflix)
72	12	"The Mech-Master 10,000"	Shane Poettcker	Glen Lakin	July 22, 2026 (Tubi); September 3, 2026 (Netflix)
73	13	"In the Pits"	Daniel Ife	Eugene Son	July 22, 2026 (Tubi); September 3, 2026 (Netflix)
74	14	"Ancient History"	Shane Poettcker	Kevin Burke & Chris "Doc" Wyatt	July 22, 2026 (Tubi); September 3, 2026 (Netflix)
75	15	"A Frozen Scar"	Daniel Ife	Glen Lakin	July 22, 2026 (Tubi); September 3, 2026 (Netflix)
76	16	"100 Eyes to See Your Soul"	Shane Poettcker	Liz Hara	July 22, 2026 (Tubi); September 3, 2026 (Netflix)
77	17	"All Wizards Are Liars"	Daniel Ife	Kevin Burke & Chris "Doc" Wyatt	July 22, 2026 (Tubi); September 3, 2026 (Netflix)
78	18	"The Summit"	Shane Poettcker	Eugene Son	July 22, 2026 (Tubi); September 3, 2026 (Netflix)
79	19	"Desperately Seeking Sora"	Daniel Ife	Nicole Dubuc	July 22, 2026 (Tubi); September 3, 2026 (Netflix)
80	20	"Dangerous Connections"	Shane Poettcker	Kevin Burke & Chris "Doc" Wyatt	July 22, 2026 (Tubi); September 3, 2026 (Netflix)

=== Season 5: Dragons' Fury (2027) ===
No. overall	No. in season	Title	Directed by	Written by	Original release date
81	1	"The Evil Within"	TBD	TBD	2027
82	2	TBA	TBD	TBD	2027
83	3	TBA	TBD	TBD	2027
84	4	TBA	TBD	TBD	2027
85	5	TBA	TBD	TBD	2027
86	6	TBA	TBD	TBD	2027
87	7	TBA	TBD	TBD	2027
88	8	TBA	TBD	TBD	2027
89	9	TBA	TBD	TBD	2027
90	10	TBA	TBD	TBD	2027
91	11	TBA	TBD	TBD	2027
92	12	TBA	TBD	TBD	2027
93	13	TBA	TBD	TBD	2027
94	14	TBA	TBD	TBD	2027
95	15	TBA	TBD	TBD	2027
96	16	TBA	TBD	TBD	2027
97	17	TBA	TBD	TBD	2027
98	18	TBA	TBD	TBD	2027
99	19	TBA	TBD	TBD	2027
100	20	TBA	TBD	TBD	2027

== Shorts ==
Title	Episodes	Originally released	
Title	Episodes	First released	Last released
The Elemental Mechs	3	January 6, 2024	January 12, 2024
Return to the Wyldness	4	July 8, 2024	
Wyldfyre's Stories	8	July 8, 2024	
Wyldfyre's Voice Notes	8	July 8, 2024	
Monstrosity	3	June 15, 2025	
Kai's Monstrous Journey	3	July 31, 2025	August 15, 2025
back at it!!!!!!!!!!	1	August 25, 2025	
Crossroads' Crosstalk	7	October 7, 2025	January 14, 2026
Duskfall	3	September 19, 2026	

=== The Elemental Mechs (2024) ===
A series of canonical shorts were released in 2024, to tie in with the release of the new sets that came out in the same year.

No.	Title	Directed by	Written by	Original release date
1	"What the Mech?"	Shawn Gulley	Kevin Burke & Chris "Doc" Wyatt	January 6, 2024
2	"The Mech Master"	Shawn Gulley	Kevin Burke & Chris "Doc" Wyatt	January 9, 2024
3	"A Pain in the Mech!"	Joel Salaysay	Kevin Burke & Chris "Doc" Wyatt	January 12, 2024

=== Return to the Wyldness (2024) ===
A second series of canonical shorts were released in 2024, set between parts 1 & 2 of season 2. They were released under the Wyldfyre online campaign.

No.	Title	Directed by	Written by	Original release date
1	"Queen of RAGE!"	Unknown	Kevin Burke & Chris "Doc" Wyatt	July 8, 2024
2	"Into the lava!"	Unknown	Kevin Burke & Chris "Doc" Wyatt	July 8, 2024
3	"A maze of reflections"	Unknown	Kevin Burke & Chris "Doc" Wyatt	July 8, 2024
4	"Time to get Red"	Unknown	Kevin Burke & Chris "Doc" Wyatt	July 8, 2024

=== Wyldfyre's Stories (2024) ===
A third series of canonical shorts were released in 2024, set between parts 1 & 2 of season 2. They were released under the Wyldfyre online campaign.

No.	Title	Directed by	Written by	Original release date
1	"My Camera Roll"	Unknown	Kevin Burke & Chris "Doc" Wyatt	July 8, 2024
2	"Draw With Me"	Unknown	Kevin Burke & Chris "Doc" Wyatt	July 8, 2024
3	"3 Things I Wish I Knew About Dragon Eggs!"	Unknown	Kevin Burke & Chris "Doc" Wyatt	July 8, 2024
4	"Dragon Translator"	Unknown	Kevin Burke & Chris "Doc" Wyatt	July 8, 2024
5	"An App to Track Feelings"	Unknown	Kevin Burke & Chris "Doc" Wyatt	July 8, 2024
6	"Meditation or Meltdown"	Unknown	Kevin Burke & Chris "Doc" Wyatt	July 8, 2024
7	"Bye-bye Bone"	Unknown	Kevin Burke & Chris "Doc" Wyatt	July 8, 2024
8	"Lessons I Learned in the Wyldness"	Unknown	Kevin Burke & Chris "Doc" Wyatt	July 8, 2024

=== Wyldfyre's Voice Notes (2024) ===
A fourth series of canonical shorts were released in 2024, set between parts 1 & 2 of season 2. They were released under the Wyldfyre online campaign.

No.	Title	Directed by	Written by	Original release date
1	"Why am I doing this"	Unknown	Kevin Burke & Chris "Doc" Wyatt	July 8, 2024
2	"So what now?"	Unknown	Kevin Burke & Chris "Doc" Wyatt	July 8, 2024
3	"I AM RAGE"	Unknown	Kevin Burke & Chris "Doc" Wyatt	July 8, 2024
4	"Desperate measures"	Unknown	Kevin Burke & Chris "Doc" Wyatt	July 8, 2024
5	"Big news!"	Unknown	Kevin Burke & Chris "Doc" Wyatt	July 8, 2024
6	"Who Am I?"	Unknown	Kevin Burke & Chris "Doc" Wyatt	July 8, 2024
7	"Finding Wyldfyre"	Unknown	Kevin Burke & Chris "Doc" Wyatt	July 8, 2024
8	"Ready to return!"	Unknown	Kevin Burke & Chris "Doc" Wyatt	July 8, 2024

=== Monstrosity (2025) ===
A series of canonical short films set between Crystalized and the first season of Dragons Rising premiered at Brickworld (Chicago) on June 12, 2025. They were later released on YouTube on June 15. They are branded under Ninjago: Legends.

No.	Title	Directed by	Written by	Original release date
1	"To Become a Monster"	Ben Marsaud	Kevin Burke & Chris "Doc" Wyatt	June 15, 2025
2	"Fallen Master"	Ben Marsaud	Kevin Burke & Chris "Doc" Wyatt	June 15, 2025
3	"False Light"	Ben Marsaud	Kevin Burke & Chris "Doc" Wyatt	June 15, 2025

=== Kai's Monstrous Journey (2025) ===
A series of canonical short films tied to Monstrosity began on July 31 and concluded on August 15, 2025.

No.	Title	Directed by	Written by	Original release date
1	"The Forest of Teeth!"	Unknown	Matt Danner, Kevin Burke & Chris "Doc" Wyatt	July 31, 2025
2	"The Ruins!"	Unknown	Matt Danner, Kevin Burke & Chris "Doc" Wyatt	August 7, 2025
3	"Queen of Monsters!"	Unknown	Matt Danner, Kevin Burke & Chris "Doc" Wyatt	August 15, 2025

=== Short (2025) ===
A short film tied to Kai's Monstrous Journey aired on August 25, 2025.

No.	Title	Directed by	Written by	Original release date
1	"back at it!!!!!!!!!!"	Unknown	Unknown	August 25, 2025

=== Crossroads' Crosstalk (2025-26) ===
A podcast series set between seasons 3 and 4 began on October 7, 2025, and concluded on January 14, 2026.

No.	Title	Directed by	Written by	Original release date
1	"Casserole!"	Unknown	Kevin Burke & Chris "Doc" Wyatt	October 7, 2025
2	"Conspiracy!"	Unknown	Kevin Burke & Chris "Doc" Wyatt	October 7, 2025
3	"Curious!"	Unknown	Kevin Burke & Chris "Doc" Wyatt	October 14, 2025
4	"Cursed!"	Unknown	Kevin Burke & Chris "Doc" Wyatt	October 21, 2025
5	"Convention!"	Unknown	Kevin Burke & Chris "Doc" Wyatt	October 27, 2025
6	"Caught!"	Unknown	Kevin Burke & Chris "Doc" Wyatt	November 4, 2025
7	"Celebration!"	Unknown	Kevin Burke & Chris "Doc" Wyatt	January 14, 2026

=== Duskfall (2026) ===
An anime-like trilogy of canonical short films that aired on September 19, 2026. Taking place in the future, it will center on the ninja as they continued to protect Ninjago City until their exploits gradually faded into legend but would eventually be rediscovered by new generations of ninja. It is set to be succeeded by a full series titled Embers + Ashes, which is set to be released in March 2027.

No.	Title	Directed by	Written by	Original release date
1	"The End Begins"	David Cazeaux & Charles Lefebvre	Glen Lakin	September 19, 2026
2	"Terminus"	David Cazeaux & Charles Lefebvre	Glen Lakin	September 19, 2026
3	"Epilogue"	David Cazeaux, Charles Lefebvre & Hugo Cierzniak	Glen Lakin	September 19, 2026

== Production ==
=== Development ===
The new series was produced following the final season of the Ninjago television series, which had been on air since 2011 and concluded in 2022. For the new series, animation company WildBrain Studios moved to Unreal Engine 5 to improve on the animation quality of its predecessor.

=== Writing ===
The lead writers for the series are Kevin Burke and Chris "Doc" Wyatt. Wyatt confirmed on Twitter that Ninjago: Dragons Rising is a new show, rather than a continuation of the previous Ninjago series, which had been on air for 11 years.

=== Music ===
Michael Kramer, Jay Vincent and Adam Dib composed the series music score. Theofania Pavli performed the series' opening theme song "We Rise".

== Release ==
The series was initially revealed at San Diego Comic-Con 2022. Season 1, Part 1 of Dragons Rising was released on Netflix on June 1, 2023, in the United States, Canada, Japan, and Latin America, and in other territories later in the same month or the next except for the UK, where it was released on CITV on June 5. It was later aired on Cartoon Network in Southeast Asia and Europe, while Part 2 was officially released on Netflix on October 12.

Season 2, Part 1 was released on Netflix on April 4, 2024, while Part 2 was released by streaming service Peacock on July 25, less than a day after the first trailer for Part 2 was released by LEGO, before its official release of October 3 on Netflix.

Season 3, Part 1 was released on Netflix on April 17, 2025, while Part 2 was released by The Roku Channel in three separate batches: episodes 11–14 on April 24, episodes 15–18 on April 25, and episodes 19–20 on August 25, before its official release of September 4 on Netflix.

Season 4, Part 1 was released on Netflix on April 2, 2026, while Part 2 was released by Tubi on July 22, before its official release of September 3 on Netflix.

Season 5: Dragons' Fury is set to premiere in 2027 as the show's final season and will be marketed as a "new show", with Netflix pushing the season as a special event.

== Reception ==
The series has generally been viewed in a highly positive light. The Hollywood Reporter gave the first season a positive review, saying that it looked just as good as the previous Ninjago series.

== Other media ==
Several playable characters and a new level based on the series were launched in Lego Brawls in June 2023.

The series Ninjago Legends: Embers + Ashes succeeds its pilot Duskfall, following the future descendants and successors of the characters.
