= Brickworld =

LEGO convention in the United States

- Former logo
- Status: Active
- Genre: LEGO fan convention
- Venue: Chicago: Renaissance Schaumburg Convention Center Hotel
- Locations: Chicago, Illinois Milwaukee, Wisconsin; Indianapolis, Indiana; Fort Wayne, Indiana; Detroit, Michigan Grand Rapids, Michigan
- Country: United States
- Inaugurated: 2007
- Attendance: 10,000+ annually
- Organizer: Brickworld LLC
- Website: brickworld.com

Brickworld is an annual LEGO fan convention that takes place in various midwest locations in the United States. The convention was founded in 2007 and mostly consists of AFOLs (Adult Fans of LEGO) or TFOLs (Teen Fans of LEGO), where they display and share their creations made of LEGO bricks. Brickworld Chicago consists of both a private convention and a public exposition, where as other locations only have the public exposition. Brickworld Chicago occurs annually on the third weekend in June.

== History ==
The first Brickworld convention was held in 2007 at the Ravinia Ballroom at the Westin Chicago North Shore in Wheeling, Illinois. In 2013, the primary Brickworld convention changed its name to Brickworld Chicago and moved to the larger Renaissance Schaumburg Convention Center Hotel venue in Schaumburg, Illinois, where it has remained ever since.

The convention was founded by LEGO enthusiasts Bryan Bonahoom and others, who wanted to create a space for LEGO fans to gather and display their creations. The convention was a success, and has since grown to become one of the largest LEGO fan conventions in the world

Brickworld was purchased in the midst of the COVID-19 pandemic by Mark Larson.

Brickworld was featured in the 2014 documentary A Lego Brickumentary.

== Activities ==
Brickworld features a wide range of activities for LEGO fans of all ages. All Brickworld public exposition include a display area where attendees can view and photograph LEGO creations from builders around the world. The expo also includes a marketplace, where vendors sell LEGO sets, parts, and accessories. The Brickworld Chicago convention includes workshops, where attendees can learn new building techniques and participate in group builds.

== See also ==
- Lego fandom
- BrickFair
- BrickCon
