= Japan Expo USA =

Anime convention in San Mateo, California

Coordinates: 37°32′46″N 122°18′5″W

- Status: Inactive
- Genre: Anime, Manga, Japanese popular culture
- Venue: San Mateo Event Center
- Location: San Mateo, California
- Country: United States
- Inaugurated: 2013
- Most recent: 2014
- Attendance: 6,456 in 2014
- Organizer: SEFA Entertainment, subsidiary of JTS Group
- Website: https://www.japan-expo.org/en/

Japan Expo USA was a three-day anime convention held in August at the San Mateo Event Center in San Mateo, California, United States. The convention was organized by SEFA Entertainment, based in San Francisco, California. It was the American subsidiary of the JTS Group, the organizing group of Japan Expo in Paris, France.

== Programming ==
The convention typically offered an artists' alley, autograph sessions, art show, concerts, dealers' room, Japanese cultural demonstrations, masquerades, vendors, video games, and video screenings.

== History ==
Japan Expo had previously expanded to other cities in France as Japan Expo Centre and Japan Expo Sud, and in Belgium as Japan Expo Belgium. The convention prior to the 2013 event had to change its re-entry policy due to fan feedback. Japan Expo USA expected 12,000 to 15,000 people to attend their first event, but these numbers were not reached, as Friday and Sunday attendance were hurt due to the start of the school season. Several dealers left early due to the lack of attendance, and some who remained believed they would not make money. Food options outside of the convention center or hotel were limited. Japan Expo used barcode scanning when entering and exiting the convention to prevent badge piracy. The convention used Japan Expo France's setup with most events based around the dealers room, autograph ticketing system, and emphasis on cultural programming. The convention also set-up cosplay changing rooms.

The convention for 2014 moved to the San Mateo Event Center in San Mateo, California, with its format similar to a Japanese festival, or Matsuri, with events occurring both inside and outside convention center buildings. Many staff changes occurred before the 2014 event, and the convention used badges with lanyards due to fan feedback. The 2014 South Napa earthquake occurred on Sunday of the convention, but did not affect the event. Attendance was again hurt due to the start of the school season and other anime conventions. Japan Expo USA went on hiatus in May 2015 as the organizers announced they were unable to meet its goals for the event.

=== Event history ===
Dates	Location	Attendance	Guests
Japan Expo 1st Impact; August 23–25, 2013	Santa Clara Convention Center; Santa Clara, California	5,534	You Kikkawa, Yusuke Kozaki, Masahiko Minami, Yoshiyuki Sadamoto, Ian Sinclair, Mike Sinterniklaas, Felipe Smith, Noriyuki Iwadare, 1000say, Dempagumi Inc., JDee'Z, and Tatsuro Iwamoto.
Japan Expo 2d August 22–24, 2014	San Mateo Event Center; San Mateo, California	6,456	A for-Real, Akai SKY, Shinji Aramaki, Hero Hiroka, Daigo Ikeno, Ilu Grace, DJ Kage, Akihiro Kanayama, Living Ichigo, Izumi Matsumoto, Mayuko, Sho Murase, Felipe Smith, Team Hideo, Gen Urobuchi, and Akira Yamaoka.

== See also ==
- Japan Expo
