= BrickCon =

LEGO convention and exhibition in North America

Coordinates: 47.621496°N 122.350886°W

- Status: Active
- Genre: LEGO
- Venue: Meydenbauer Center
- Location: Bellevue, Washington
- Country: US
- Inaugurated: 2002
- Attendance: 12,000+ in 2023
- Organizer: BrickCon Foundation
- Website: www.brickcon.org

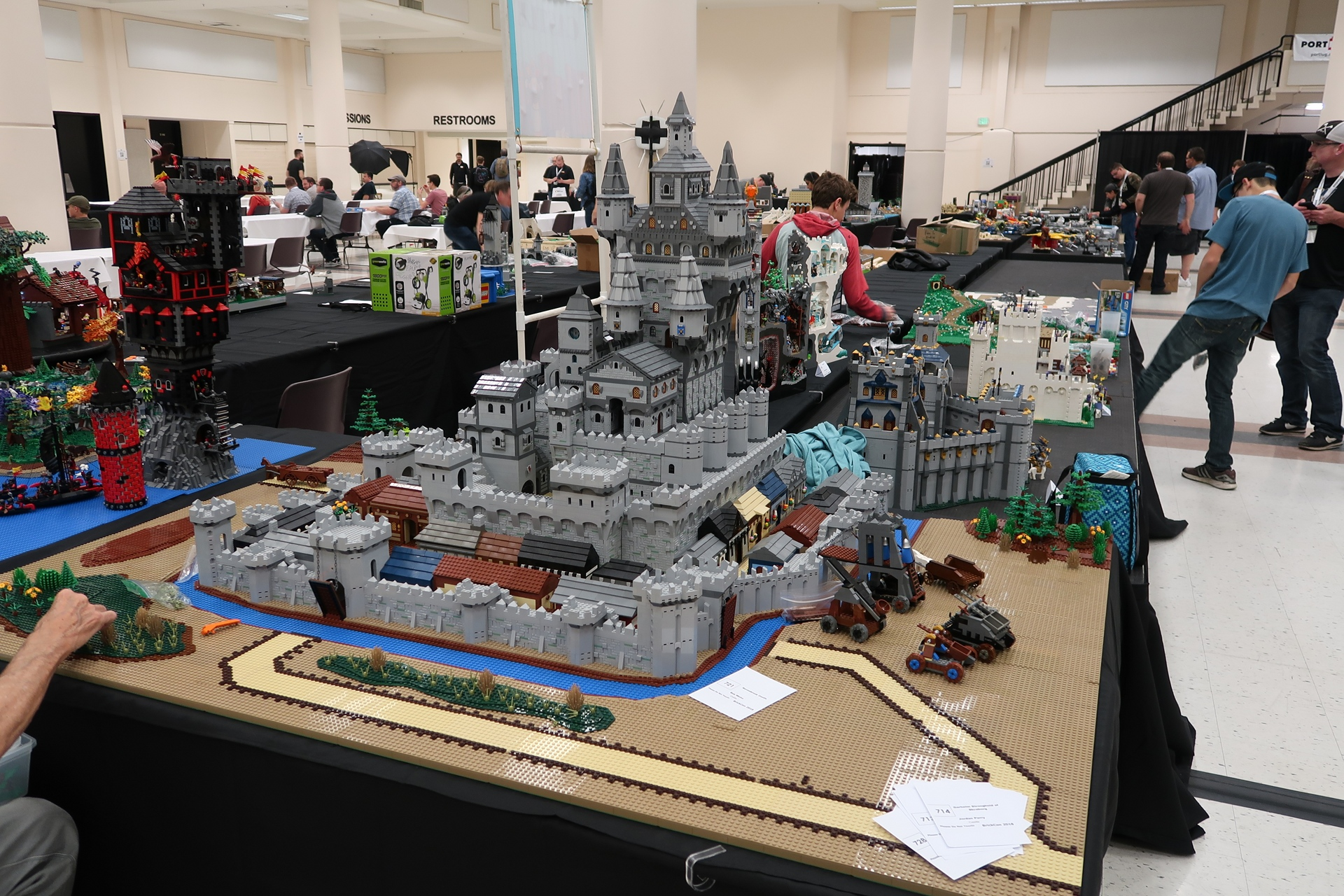
BrickCon 2018

BrickCon (formerly known as NorthWest BrickCon) is a LEGO convention and exhibition in North America. It is held annually for adult fans of LEGO and hobbyists in Bellevue, Washington. BrickCon runs about four days, generally Thursday through Sunday, and was held the first weekend in October, but has moved to the weekend after Labor Day. The event brings together the fan community that has evolved as a result of the Internet and helps them explore and develop their LEGO hobby. BrickCon is not affiliated to the LEGO company. BrickCon is made up of two parts: the private convention and the public exhibition.

== Private convention ==
The private convention's main focus is to provide a venue for adult fans of LEGO to come together as a community and bring and display their own LEGO constructions. Activities at the convention include presentations, seminars, round-table discussions, contests, games, door prizes and many experiences unique to a LEGO Fan Convention. The full attendee receives a convention packet containing personalized bricks, a name badge, a program of activities, handouts and coupons.

== Public exhibition ==
The public exhibition's main focus is to invite LEGO fans of all ages of the general public to view hundreds of hobbyist-built creations and meet their creators. Visitors may watch the Mindstorms robot battles or Brickfilm (a LEGO-themed film), browse and shop at various LEGO vendors, or have their kids build something in the building zone. Various themes on display can include castles, space ships, trains, Great Ball Contraptions (GBCs), pop culture and many other.

== Events ==
2002 – The first NWBrickCon - Be There, Be Square
Location: Center House at Seattle Center
Attendees: 48
Public Guests: 3,000 – 5,000
Layout:
"Back Room" (800 sq.ft.)
"Lobby" (1,000 sq.ft.)
"Main Floor" (200 sq.ft.)
Notes: There were no "Attendees", but there were 48 adult builders displaying. This was an all-exhibit event.

2003 – The first NWBrickCon with attendees and guests - Be There, Be Square
Location: Snoqualmie Room at Seattle Center
Attendees: 47
Guests: 2,000+
Layout: All in one room (3,000 sq.ft.)
Notes: This event was the first to have paid Attendees, paying Guests, Presentations, Brick Bazaar, and a Special Guest (Brad Justus from Lego Group).

2004 – NWBrickCon is held on Halloween weekend - Halloween!
Location: (Dan Parker's Studio), The Commons, Federal Way
Attendees: ~45
Guests: ~2,000
Layout:
"Exhibition Hall" (1,600 sq.ft.)
"Bazaar + General Meeting" (1,200 sq.ft.)
"Racing" (900 sq.ft.)
Notes: This was a fallback situation as initial plans fell through. Due to the arrangements, there was no charge for Public Guests nor could the Bazaar open to the Public.

2005 – NWBrickCon returns to the Center on the first weekend of October - Ghostly!
Location: Rainier Room of the Northwest Rooms at Seattle Center (6,000 sq.ft.).
Attendees: 65
Guests: 2,000+
Layout:
"Exhibition Hall" (4,500 sq.ft.)
"Bazaar + General Meeting" (2,500 sq.ft.)

2006 – NWBrickCon moves to a larger facility and keeps the first weekend of October - Heroes!
Location: The Seattle Center Pavilion A + B at Seattle Center (13,000 sq.ft.)
Attendees: 85
Guests: 3,500
Layout:
"Exhibition Hall + Kid Build" (8,000 sq.ft.)
"Bazaar + General Meeting" (5,000 sq.ft.)
Notes: The event began to show definite signs of growth.

2007 – BrickCon swells to overflow the Pavilion - Pirates!
Location: The Seattle Center Pavilion A + B at Seattle Center (13,000 sq.ft.)
Attendees: ~145
Guests: ~3,700
Layout:
"Exhibition Hall + General Meeting" (8,000 sq.ft.)
"Bazaar + Kid Build" (5,000 sq.ft.)

2008 – BrickCon moves again to a larger facility - Be Part of the Adventure!
Location: The Exhibition Hall (half) at Seattle Center (20,000 sq.ft.)
Attendees: ~235
Guests: ~6,900

2009 – Continued growth- Imagination in Motion!
Location: The (whole) Exhibition Hall at Seattle Center (34,000 sq.ft.)
Attendees: ~375
Guests: ~9,300

2010 – Added the Rainier Room for all convention activities (34,000 + 6,000 sq.ft.) - Tales of the Brick!
Location: The Exhibition Hall at Seattle Center
Attendees: ~475
Guests: ~11,000

2011 - Used all of the Northwest Rooms for convention activities (34,000 + 17,000 sq.ft.) - Building a Community!
Location: The Exhibition Hall and Northwest Rooms at Seattle Center
Attendees: 535
Guests: 11,000

2012 - 10th Anniversary BrickCon
Location: The Exhibition Hall and Northwest Rooms at Seattle Center
Attendees: 470
Guests: 12,000+

2013 - 12th BrickCon - Pigs v s. Cows!
Location: The Exhibition Hall and Northwest Rooms at Seattle Center
Attendees: 445
Guests: 12,000+

2014 - 13th BrickCon - Invasion!
Location: The Exhibition Hall and Cornish Playhouse at Seattle Center. The first event at the Cornish, which used the theater, stage, lobby Founders Room, and "black box" (the separated rehearsal space). Total area 34,000 sq ft + 9,000 sq ft.
Attendees: 435
Guests: 13,100+

2015 - 14th BrickCon - MOCking History!
Date: October 1–4, 2015
Location: The Exhibition Hall at Seattle Center. The Cornish was previously engaged and the convention operated entirely within the Ex Hall.
Attendees: 470
Guests: 13,600

2016 - 15th BrickCon - Madness This year, the convention added a Friends and Family Night to its Friday schedule.
Date: September 29 - October 2, 2016
Location: The Exhibition Hall at Seattle Center and (returning to) Cornish Playhouse at Seattle Center.
Attendees: 450
Guests: 10,600

2017 - 16th BrickCon - Brick To Old School
Date: October 5–8, 2017
Location: The Exhibition Hall at Seattle Center and Cornish Playhouse at Seattle Center. The first ever sold-out event.
Attendees: 470
Guests: 13,600

2018 - 17th BrickCon - Hidden Worlds
Date: October 4–7, 2018
Location: The Exhibition Hall at Seattle Center and Cornish Playhouse at Seattle Center
Attendees: 475
Guests: 13,600

2019 - 18th BrickCon - Just BUILD It! Date: October 3–6, 2019
Location: The Exhibition Hall at Seattle Center and Cornish Playhouse at Seattle Center
Attendees: 443
Guests: 12,200

2020 - 19th BrickCon - Hindsight Date: October 1–4, 2020
Location: Due to COVID-19, this event was virtual only. More than one person could attend per ticket.
Attendee: 521
Guests: 1,139

2021 - 20th BrickCon - TBD: Two Brickcon Decades Date: October 1–3, 2021
Location: The Exhibition Hall at Seattle Center, Cornish Playhouse at Seattle Center and virtual.
Attendee: 317 total (216 in-person, 101 virtual)
Guests: 3,342

2022 - 21st BrickCon - 21, Time for fun Date: Sept 29 - Oct 2, 2022
Location: The Exhibition Hall at Seattle Center, Cornish Playhouse at Seattle Center and virtual.
Attendee and Guests numbers not released.

2023 22nd BrickCon - Journeys Date: Sept 7 - 10, 2023
Location: Meydenbauer Center, Bellevue
Attendee: 541 total (489 in-person, 52 virtual)
Guests 12,592
BrickCon moves to Bellevue after 16 years of being at the Seattle Center Exhibition Hall. Event sold out both public days.

2024 23rd BrickCon - Foundations Date: Sept 5-8 2024
Location: Meydenbauer Center, Bellevue
Attendee and Guests numbers not released.
First year run by the BrickCon Foundation.
