= Great Ball Contraption =

Type of contraption built with Lego

The design standard, invented by Steve Hassenplug

Great Ball Contraptions (GBCs) are a type of Lego design comprising a machine built with both regular and Technic bricks that continuously transports Lego balls through different modules using chain reactions. Robotic elements from products such as Lego Mindstorms can also be used. They are sometimes compared to Rube Goldberg machines, and have been featured multiple times by the Guinness World Records.

Great Ball Contraptions are popular at Lego fan conventions, with a community of builders who design them. They are often collaborative, with different designers creating different modules. They can consist of several hundred modules and take nearly an hour to complete their circuit.

Several precursors include the Ping Pong Ball Handoff challenge hosted by the Lafayette LEGO Robotics Club, as well as the SMART's Crate Contraption, both in 2004, which contained elements of GBCs. The term was coined by Steve Hassenplug on LUGNET in 2005. After this, many people began to create ball contraptions of their own, beginning the trend.
