= Impulse Universe =

American fan convention organizer

- Logo of Anime Impulse, Impulse Universe's flagship convention
- Industry: Convention organizer
- Founded: January 16, 2016; 10 years ago
- Headquarters: Rosemead, California, United States
- Website: www.impulseuniverse.com

Impulse Universe is an American fan convention organizer. It hosts a series of joint conventions of various topics around the United States each year.

The company's first and primary project was Anime Impulse, an anime and manga convention, that was first held in 2016 as part of the Asian American Expo. K-Play! Fest debuted in 2022 for K-pop and South Korean culture. Impulse Universe also puts on Collectors Expo for trading cards and memorabilia as well as Sneaker Expo for footwear. All of its conventions are organized together in the same locations, and a ticket for one event grants access to the others.

== History ==
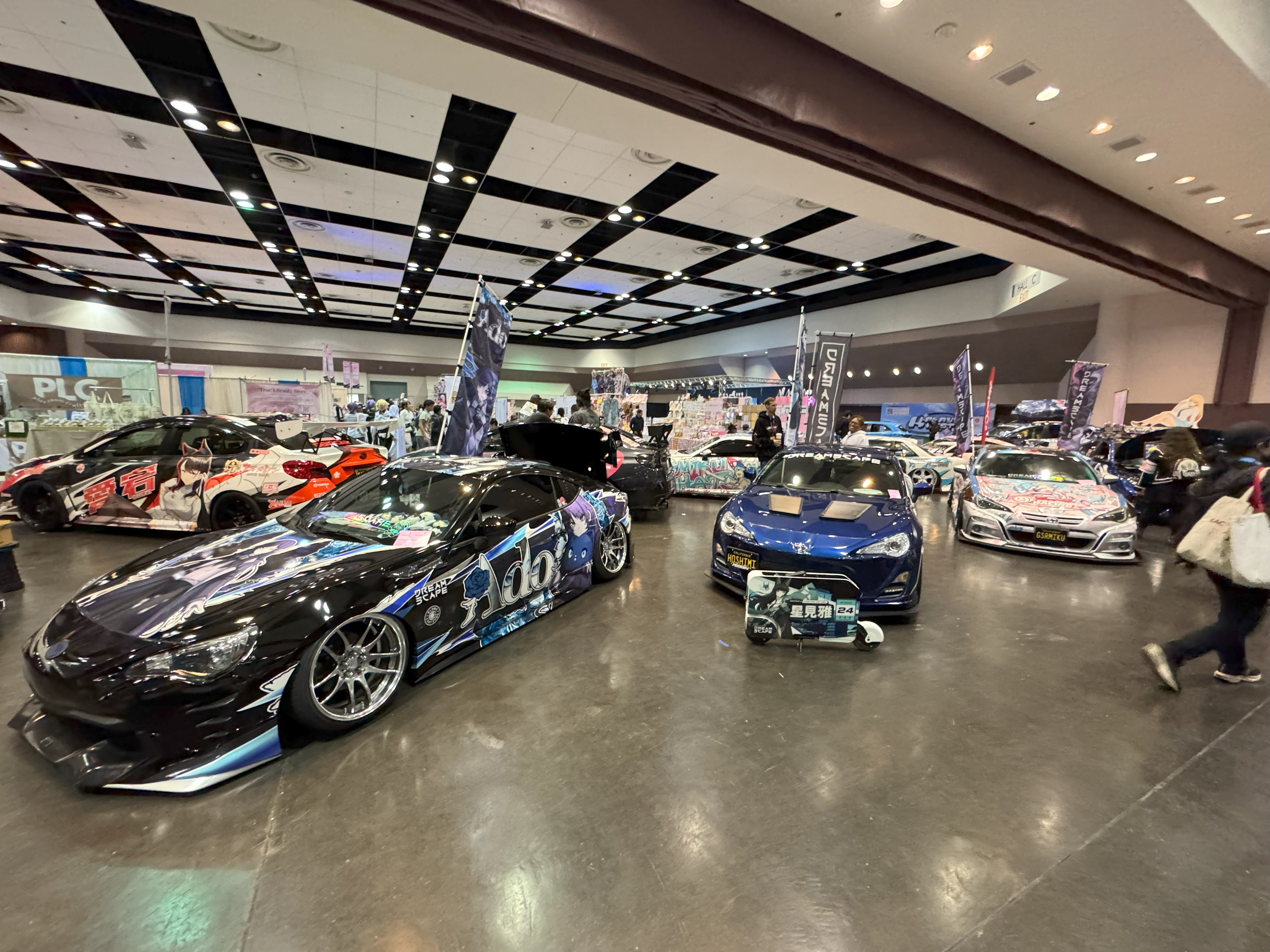
Itasha car show at Anime Impulse Bay Area 2025

Anime Impulse was founded in 2016 to support the Asian American Expo. AAE had been in operation since 1987 to celebrate the Chinese New Year, taking place at the Pasadena Convention Center before moving to the Fairplex in Pomona, California, in 1992 and expanding to multiple cultures.

In 2016, Anime Impulse was created to support the Asian American Expo. Producer Kaila Yu explained such an arrangement helped Anime Impulse stand out from other conventions since "all guests have access to over 100 food vendors at the event also." Amped Asia described the inaugural AI as the "Anime Expo of the spring season". Anime Impulse grew in size over the years while continuing to operate alongside the AAE.

Impulse Universe was created to oversee Anime Impulse, described as a more casual convention experience since "people loved anime, but didn't identify as hardcore fans. They just wanted a space to vibe, connect, and explore."

Impulse Universe subsequently organized conventions for other topics. K-Play! Fest, the first American convention focused on K-pop, debuted in 2022. Collectors Expo was intended for trading cards and memorabilia. Sneaker Expo focused on footwear.

After initially hosting solely in California, Impulse Universe held its first conventions outside the state in 2024 with events in Seattle and Phoenix. The latter was selected due to the increase in Korean artists performing in the city, turning it into a viable location for K-Play! Fest. Sik-K was the featured performer at the Seattle K-Play! Fest.

Tickets for each weekend give entry to every convention. Such an arrangement is to encourage attendees to entertain other forms of media outside of what they are accustomed to.

Through 2025, Toyota Motor North America was the presenting sponsor for Impulse Universe conventions.

== Convention history ==
=== Los Angeles ===
Dates	Location	Guests
January 16–17, 2016	Fairplex; Pomona, California	D-Piddy, Alodia Gosiengfiao, Linda Le, Aimee Lee Lucas, Nylon Pink, Stephanie Yanez, Steven Zakari
January 14–15, 2017	Fairplex; Pomona, California	Breathlessaire, Danny Choo, D-Piddy, Johnny Junkers, Midnight Shinigami, Phil Mizuno, Nylon Pink, Gaku Space, Diana "Binkx" Tolin, Tune in Tokyo, Twin Cosplay, Stephanie Yanez, Steven Zakari
January 13–14, 2018	Fairplex; Pomona, California	D-Piddy, Hana Dinh, Annjela Saet, Stephanie Yanez
January 19–20, 2019	Fairplex; Pomona, California	Ray Chase, Robbie Daymond, Hana Bunny, Johnny Junkers, Max Mittelman, Chris Patton, Derek Stephen Prince, Chris Tergliafera, Ezra Weisz
January 18–19, 2020	Fairplex; Pomona, California	Brian Beacock, Morgan Berry, Lucien Dodge, Xanthe Huynh, Billy Kametz, Faye Mata, Danielle McRae, Erica Mendez, Cristina Vee, Ezra Weisz, Brandon Winckler
January 15–16, 2022	Fairplex; Pomona, California	Poonam Basu, Kira Buckland, Griffin Burns, Ray Chase, Brittany Cox, D-Piddy, Robbie Daymond, Xanthe Huynh, Aleks Le, Ryan Colt Levy, Risa Mei, Max Mittelman, Casey Mongillo, Keith Silverstein, Ezra Weisz, Suzie Yeung, Jenny Yokobori
January 14–15, 2023	Fairplex; Pomona, California	Anime Impulse: Johnny Yong Bosch, Kira Buckland, Griffin Burns, Tiana Camacho, Allegra Clark, Brittany Cox, Stephen Fu, Chris Hackney, Xanthe Huynh, KingChris, Aleks Le, Cherami Leigh, Erica Lindbeck, Faye Mata, Ry McKeand, Risa Mei, Erica Mendez, Casey Mongillo, Cassandra Lee Morris, Griffin Puatu, Zeno Robinson, Michelle Ruff, Alejandro Saab, Jonah Scott, Abby Trott, Howard Wang, Mark Whitten, Suzie Yeung; K-Play! Fest: AleXa
January 13–14, 2024	Fairplex; Pomona, California	Zach Aguilar, Dawn M. Bennett, Ray Chase, Allegra Clark, Amber Lee Connors, Robbie Daymond, Chris Hackney, Jennie Kwan, Lauren Landa, Aleks Le, Mela Lee, Erica Mendez, Max Mittelman, Xander Mobus, Zeno Robinson, Alejandro Saab, Keith Silverstein, Suzie Yeung, Joe Zieja
February 15–16, 2025	Fairplex; Pomona, California	Clifford Chapin, Charlet Chung, Allegra Clark, Robbie Daymond, Ryan Drummond, Dan Green, Kyle Hebert, Lauren Landa, Brenna Larsen, Risa Mei, Eric Stuart
January 17–18, 2026	Fairplex; Pomona, California	Zach Aguilar, Jon Allen, Dawn M. Bennett, Kira Buckland, Griffin Burns, Ray Chase, Amber Lee Connors, Robbie Daymond, Stephen Fu, Kellen Goff, Ironmouse, Erica Mendez, Casey Mongillo, Laura Post, Zeno Robinson, Jonah Scott, Patrick Seitz, Jeremy Shada, Alexis Tipton

=== Orange County ===
Dates	Location	Guests
September 3–4, 2022	OC Fair & Event Center; Costa Mesa, California	Zach Aguilar, Dawn M. Bennett, Tiana Camacho, Ray Chase, Allegra Clark, Robbie Daymond, Lucien Dodge, Dorothy Elias-Fahn, Lizzie Freeman, Chris Hackney, Xanthe Huynh, Jackie Lastra, Aleks Le, Ryan Colt Levy, Josey Montana McCoy, Kayleigh McKee, Erica Mendez, Kayli Mills, Max Mittelman, Laura Post, Anairis Quiñones, Alejandro Saab, Keith Silverstein, Laura Faye Smith, Stephanie Southerland, Kaiji Tang, Howard Wang, Ezra Weisz, Mark Whitten, Anne Yatco, Jenny Yokobori, Joe Zieja
September 2–3, 2023	Anaheim Convention Center; Anaheim, California	Dawn M. Bennett, Edward Bosco, Griffin Burns, Bill Butts, Kimberley Anne Campbell, Paul Castro Jr., Allegra Clark, Stephen Fu, Chris Hackney, Xanthe Huynh, Amber May, Max Mittelman, Patrick Pedraza, Alejandro Saab, Howard Wang, Ezra Weisz, Jenny Yokobori
August 31 – September 1, 2024	Anaheim Convention Center; Anaheim, California	Ben Balmaceda, Dante Basco, A.J. Beckles, Paul Castro Jr., Stephen Fu, Damien Haas, Todd Haberkorn, Xanthe Huynh, Tetsuya Kakihara, Aleks Le, Ryan Colt Levy, Erica Lindbeck, Lotus Juice, Yuri Lowenthal, Daman Mills, Tara Platt, Anairis Quiñones, Adin Rudd, Eric Stuart, Mark Whitten, Jenny Yokobori, Arryn Zech
August 30–31, 2025	Anaheim Convention Center; Anaheim, California	Johnny Yong Bosch, CDawgVA, Stephen Fu, Alan Lee, AmaLee, Michelle Marie, Erica Mendez, Kaitlyn Robrock, Michelle Ruff, Erica Schroeder
August 22–23, 2026	Anaheim Convention Center; Anaheim, California	Jon Bailey, JB Blanc, Edward Bosco, Erik Braa, Kira Buckland, Griffin Burns, Alejandra Cazares, Brook Chalmers, Khoi Dao, Scott Dreier, Ryan Drummond, Analesa Fisher, Barbara Goodson, Zachary Gordon, Xanthe Huynh, Lauren Landa, Mela Lee, Faye Mata, Kayli Mills, Cassandra Lee Morris, Patrick Pedraza, Lisa Reimold, Brandon Rogers, Keith Silverstein, Jason Spisak, Alpha Takahashi, Nick Wolfhard

=== Bay Area ===
Dates	Location	Guests
July 29–30, 2023	San Mateo County Event Center; San Mateo, California	Kira Buckland, Allegra Clark, Stephen Fu, Xanthe Huynh, Erica Lindbeck, Faye Mata, Adam McArthur, Casey Mongillo, Matthew David Rudd, Alejandro Saab, Anne Yatco
October 12–13, 2024	San Mateo County Event Center; San Mateo, California	A.J. Beckles, Ray Chase, Sean Chiplock, Greg Chun, Robbie Daymond, Todd Haberkorn, Xanthe Huynh, Lauren Landa, Max Mittelman, Sarah Natochenny, Anairis Quiñones, Howard Wang, Mark Whitten
July 26–27, 2025	Santa Clara Convention Center; Santa Clara, California	Dante Basco, Scott Dreier, Ryan Drummond, Lizzie Freeman, Brianna Knickerbocker, Brandon McInnis, Cassandra Lee Morris, Laura Post, Kaho Shibuya, Keith Silverstein, J. Michael Tatum, Mark Whitten
July 18–19, 2026	Santa Clara Convention Center; Santa Clara, California	Samantha Béart, Brian Beacock, Morgan Berry, Tiana Camacho, Brook Chalmers, Sean Chiplock, Charlet Chung, Crystal Lee, Marissa Lenti, Risa Mei

=== Other locations ===
Dates	Location	Guests
March 18–19, 2023	Del Mar Fairgrounds; Del Mar, California	A.J. Beckles, Griffin Burns, Sean Chiplock, Chris Hackney, Erica Lindbeck, Josey Montana McCoy, Max Mittelman, Anairis Quiñones, Zeno Robinson, Keith Silverstein, Krissy Victory, Mark Whitten
May 18–19, 2024	Seattle Convention Center; Seattle, Washington	Anime Impulse: Dawn M. Bennett, Edward Bosco, Robbie Daymond, Lucien Dodge, Stephen Fu, Michael Kovach, Lauren Landa, Erica Mendez, Max Mittelman, Casey Mongillo, Ashley Nichols, Keith Silverstein, Howard Wang; K-Play! Fest: Sik-K
August 3–4, 2024	Phoenix Convention Center; Phoenix, Arizona	Ryan Bartley, Griffin Burns, Ray Chase, Allegra Clark, Robbie Daymond, Aaron Dismuke, Lex Lang, Ryan Colt Levy, Emi Lo, Adam McArthur, Kayli Mills, Reagan Murdock, Patrick Pedraza, Anairis Quiñones, Zeno Robinson, Nicolas Roye, Sarah Wiedenheft, Anne Yatco
November 15–16, 2025	Kay Bailey Hutchison Convention Center; Dallas, Texas	
