= Santa Clara Convention Center =

Convention center in Santa Clara, California, United States

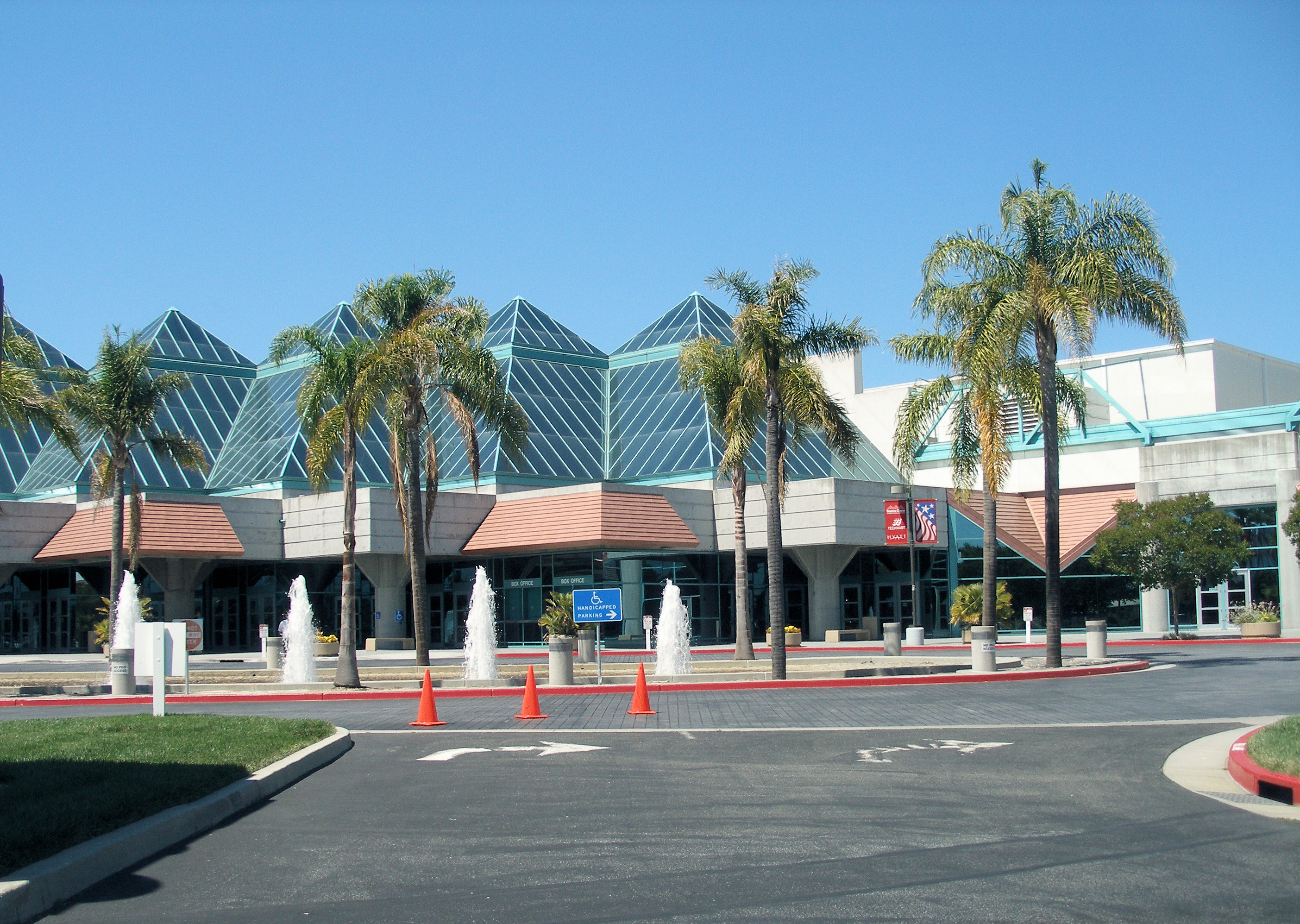
- South entrance on Tasman Drive.
- Interactive map of Santa Clara; Convention Center
- Address: 5001 Great America Pkwy, Santa Clara, CA 95054
- Location: Santa Clara, California
- Coordinates: 37°24′17″N 121°58′31″W
- Owner: City of Santa Clara
- Operator: Spectra
- Public transit: VTA light rail Green Line; Orange Line at Great America station Amtrak at Santa Clara–Great America

Construction
- Built: 1986
- Expanded: 2009

The Santa Clara Convention Center is located in northern Santa Clara, California. It serves as one of the large meeting and convention facilities in Silicon Valley, with 262,000 square feet (24,300 m^{2}) of meeting space. It was built in 1986 and expanded in 2009.

The convention center is located in the same complex as the Hyatt Regency Santa Clara and the Santa Clara TechMart conference center. It is adjacent to the VTA Great America light rail station and across the street from the Great America theme park.

== History ==
The convention center was completed in 1986 and hosted the first Apple Worldwide Developers Conference the following year. The ballroom space was expanded in 2009.

During the COVID-19 pandemic, the Strategic National Stockpile Division of the United States Department of Health and Human Services converted the convention center into a Federal Medical Station to receive up to 250 noncritical patients from local hospitals.

== Events ==
The current annual event schedule includes:

- Printed Circuit Board Design Conference (1994–present)
- Silicon Valley Auto Show (2023–present)
- Impulse Universe (2025–present)

The convention center has hosted the following notable events:

- Worldwide Developers Conference (1987)
- North American Bengali Conference (1999, 2017)
- ARM DevSummit (2004–2017)
- BayCon with the Hyatt Regency Santa Clara (2008–2015)
- Bricks by the Bay (2010-2022)
- Japan Expo USA (2013)
- Super Bowl 50 side events (2015)
- GaymerX (2016)
- Crunchyroll Expo (2017)
- Federal Medical Station in response to the COVID-19 pandemic (2020)
- 2024 Pan American Wushu Championships

== See also ==
- San Jose Convention Center
- List of convention centers in the United States
