= BrickFest =

LEGO building block convention in the United States

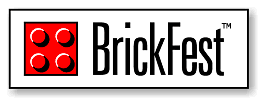
- Status: every year
- Genre: LEGO
- Venue: Various
- Location: Washington, D.C.
- Country: USA
- Inaugurated: 2000
- Most recent: 2009
- Attendance: 4,000 in 2009
- Organizer: Christina Hitchcock - Steve Barlie
- Website: www.brickfest.com

BrickFest was the first convention for adult fans of LEGO (AFOLs) in the United States. The focus was to have fans bring their creations, often referred to as MOCs (My Own Creations), to display and share with fellow enthusiasts.

Like other conventions, it offered workshops, presentations, special events and challenges.

BrickFest was typically held on a weekend in mid-August in the Washington, D.C. area annually from 2000 through 2006. The 2007 and 2009 BrickFests were held in Portland, Oregon at the Oregon Convention Center. BrickFest 2011 and BrickFest as a whole was cancelled by the organizers, with staffing issues cited.

== Private convention ==
The main focus of the private convention was to provide a venue for adult fans of LEGO to bring and display their own LEGO creations. Activities at the convention included presentations, seminars, round-table discussions and contests. The full attendee received a Convention Packet containing a personalized brick name badge and a program of activities.

== Public exhibition ==
The Public Exhibition had a focus of inviting LEGO fans of all ages of the general public to view hundreds of hobbyist-built creations and meet their creators.

== Locations and dates ==
Dates	Location	Organizer	Registrants	Attendance	Notes
June 9–11, 2000	George Mason University, Arlington, Virginia	Christina Hitchcock	~60		First BrickFest event
July 13–15, 2001	George Mason University, Arlington, Virginia	Christina Hitchcock	~150		
July 19–21, 2002	George Mason University, Arlington, Virginia	Christina Hitchcock	~180		
August 8–10, 2003	George Mason University, Arlington, Virginia	Christina Hitchcock	~220	~1,000	
February 12–14, 2004	Oregon Convention Center, Portland, Oregon	Steve Barile	~200	~1,200	Named BrickFestPDX, first BrickFest to be held outside Virginia
August 13–15, 2004	George Mason University, Arlington, Virginia	Christina Hitchcock	~250	~2,000	
August 12–14, 2005	George Mason University, Arlington, Virginia	Christina Hitchcock	~350	~3,000	Kjeld Kirk Kristiansen (owner of the LEGO Group and grandson of the founder) attended, Jake McKee and Mark Hansen announced the release of LEGO Digital Designer
August 25–27, 2006	Sheraton Premiere at Tyson's Corner, Vienna, Virginia	Joe Meno	~420	~3,500	First BrickFest since the launching of Lego Mindstorms NXT, and many of the MUP and MDP members were there to talk about it. Allan Bedford, author of The Unofficial LEGO Builder's Guide, was also there, signing copies of his book.
March 30-April 1, 2007	Oregon Convention Center, Portland, Oregon	Steve Barile & Christina Hitchcock	213	~2,800	This was originally slated as BrickFest PDX 2007, but relabeled as simply BrickFest 2007 when the August convention was cancelled.
March 28–30, 2009	Oregon Convention Center, Portland, Oregon	Steve Barile & Christina Hitchcock		~4,000	Approximately 240 people pre registered to attend.
