= BrickArms =

American company

BrickArms is a limited liability company specializing in minifigure accessories, specifically weaponry. It is unaffiliated with LEGO, instead privately owned and operated by designer Will Chapman from his home in Redmond, Washington. The company was briefly the subject of controversy when one of its products was accused of being based on a member of al-Qaeda.

== History ==
BrickArms began in 2006 when Ian Chapman, Will Chapman's youngest son approached him with the need for World War II weaponry for his LEGO builds. Ian was disappointed with what historical weaponry LEGO offered. Will ultimately choose to begin to design and produce his own, more accurate minifigure accessories, running the company from the Chapmans' garage in Redmond, Washington and packing orders in the family's bonus room.

In 2011 Will and Jennifer Chapman decided to focus solely on the creation and production of the BrickArms product line, rather than the sale and on May 1, they ceased direct sales on the BrickArms website. On the same date, the Chapmans' nephew Keith Nelson and his wife, Julie, launched the new GI Brick website, becoming the third authorized reseller of the BrickArms line in the United States. As of 2017, there were nine resellers worldwide, including GI Brick.

== Products ==
By 2008, BrickArms was producing more than twenty weapons. BrickArms produces a variety of minifigure-compatible accessories including an M4 carbine, M21 Sniper Rifle, M1 Garand, M84 grenades, M1 Helmet, Stahlhelm, Minigun, AK-47, M3 Grease Gun, M16, and a Combat Shotgun, along with many other items related to warfare. The accessories are designed by Chapman using a CAD program and are prototyped using a small mold cut by Chapman using a CNC to test the proportions, aesthetics, and playability of the resulting prototype. Once the design of an accessory is finalized, it is mass-produced via injection molding of Acrylonitrile Butadiene Styrene (ABS) plastic into professionally tooled production molds.

In 2013 World War Brick, a LEGO fan event, Brickarms brought a new series of weapons called Over Molded. These weapons were more detail and colored. Using a special "overmolded" technique, Will Chapman was able to hand-inject these special two-color BrickArms weapons. These are not painted, but two colors of solid ABS plastic molded into one piece. Each one comes in a special "BrickArms Reloaded" blister pack and are rare. Brickarms is also known for its minifigs such as a colonial marine based on the game Aliens: Colonial Marines, Shaun based on the movie Shaun of the Dead, and Private Ryan from Saving Private Ryan.

== Bandit controversy ==
On December 4, 2008, a BrickArms custom minifig called the "White Bandit" sparked controversy when The Sun (United Kingdom) published an article claiming the figure was based on a follower of Osama bin Laden. Chapman has denied this, saying it is a generic villain and "is merely a bad guy for the good guys to battle."
