= Bricks by the Bay =

Lego fan convention in California

- Genre: Lego convention
- Frequency: Annual
- Venue: Santa Clara Convention Center
- Locations: Fremont, California; Santa Clara, California
- Country: United States
- Years active: 2010-2022
- Website: www.bricksbythebay.org

Bricks by the Bay is an annual Lego fan convention based in California that ran regularly from 2010 to 2022. Each convention had its own theme.

== History ==
The first convention was held in Fremont, California. Due to the size of the convention, it was moved to the Santa Clara, California. The convention presented a Best of Show award to builders. Over 5,000 people attended in 2016. In 2024, it was announced the convention had been put on hiatus.
