= LUGNET =

Lego-oriented online community

- Available in: English
- Creators: Todd Lehman, Suzanne Rich
- Website: lugnet.com
- Commercial: No
- Registration: Optional
- Launched: 1998
- Current status: Online

LUGNET (short for Lego Users Group Network) is one of the largest online Adult Fan of Lego (AFOL) communities. It was founded by Todd Lehman and Suzanne Rich.

== Summary ==
LUGNET provides a forum for Adult Fans of Lego to discuss Lego-related issues and post about creations using its NNTP, e-mail and web interfaces. LUGNET members can track their sets, build web pages, rate postings and create polls. The website also features a database of Lego sets and provides links to other major Lego sites. The aim of LUGNET is "To enrich the online experience for the LEGO enthusiast in a growing number of new ways".
