= Larry Carroll =

Larry Carroll may refer to:

- Lawrence Carroll, album cover artist
- Larry Carroll (director) (died 2015), television director
