= List of Polly Pocket episodes =

The following is a list of episodes from the series Polly Pocket. The show first aired on Family Channel in Canada on July 8, 2018 and on Universal Kids in the United States on July 1, 2019.

On November 15, 2020, the second season was released on Netflix. The third season, as Polly Pocket: Rainbow Funland Adventures (split into two parts), was released on September 29, 2021 and January 9, 2022. The fourth season, as Polly Pocket: Summer of Adventure (split into two parts) was released on April 1, 2022 and August 1 of the same year. A movie titled Polly Pocket: Sparkle Cove Adventure, was released on August 21, 2023. The fifth season, as Polly Pocket: Hidden Worlds, was released on March 25, 2024 and July 22 of the same year. The sixth and final season, as Polly Pocket: Adventures in Rio was released from September 6, 2024, to October 19, 2025.

== Series overview ==
Season	Episodes	Originally released		
Season	Episodes	First released	Last released	Network
1	26	July 8, 2018	November 25, 2018	Family Channel (Canada); Universal Kids; Netflix (worldwide); YouTube (worldwide)
2	13	November 15, 2020		Family Channel (Canada); Universal Kids; Netflix (worldwide); YouTube (worldwide)
3	26	September 29, 2021	January 9, 2022	Netflix (worldwide); YouTube (worldwide)
4	26	January 9, 2022	August 1, 2022	Netflix (worldwide); YouTube (worldwide)
5	26	March 25, 2024	July 22, 2024	Netflix (worldwide); YouTube (worldwide)
6	38	September 6, 2024	October 19, 2025	Amazon Prime Video (worldwide); YouTube (worldwide)

== Episodes ==
=== Season 1 (2018) ===
No. overall	No. in season	Title	Directed by	Written by	Storyboard by	Original release date	Prod. code
1	1	"Tiny Power" (Note: Family Channel aired part 1 on August 4, 2018 and part 2 the following day in Canada.)	Jon Izen	Shea Fontana	Krista-Marie Porter and Sam To	July 1, 2018 (Note: Family Channel aired this episode on July 1, 2018.); July 8, 2018	101 102
2	2	"Tiny Power"	Brent Bouchard	Shea Fontana	Desirae Salmark and Sidne Marat	July 1, 2018; July 8, 2018	101 102
Part 1: When Polly's grandma visits, Polly offers to fix her broken locket. While fixing it, Polly realizes that this locket can shrink her down to pocket size. Grandma explains the power and its history, hoping Polly can use it for good. Part 2: When Melody is tied up and taken hostage as a bargaining chip by the Grandes for Polly's locket, Polly has to help her escape in time for her show, and Shani is forced to temporarily take her place.
3	3	"Bumpy Ride"	Jon Izen	Shea Fontana	Dave Wiebe and Sam To	August 5, 2018	103
When Polly and pals find out that they are too short to ride the new Whopper Whirler at the amusement park, Polly recreates a miniature version of the coaster. But a faulty screw causes the mini-coaster to break. Realising that the real roller coaster is in danger, they must fix it before it breaks too.
4	4	"Doggone Disaster"	Brent Bouchard	Shea Fontana	Sidne Marat and Desirae Salmark	August 5, 2018	104
Lila starts a dog-walking service but finds herself in trouble, so she asks Polly and Shani for help. However, Paxton and Polly are being watched by the stern, stick-in-the-mud Mrs. Mense, so Polly has to sneak out. But when one of the dogs runs off, and the Grandes interfere, the Pocket Posse must get the dog back before it ruins a dinner date for Polly's parents.
5	5	"Super Tiny Fly"	Jon Izen	Elise Allen	Hailey Kathler and James Borne	August 8, 2018 (Note: Family Channel aired on August 8, 2018 in Canada); August 10, 2018	105
When the girls find and nurse a baby bird back to health, Polly wants to keep it, but Shani convinces her to help it get home. However, Gwen captures all four of them and they must break out of her cage before Griselle finds them. In the end, Polly learns that if you love something, then sometimes you must set it free.
6	6	"Mommy, I Shrunk the Kid"	Brent Bouchard	Elise Allen	John Young and Melissa Allen	August 9, 2018 (Note: Family Channel aired on August 9, 2018 in Canada); August 12, 2018	106
Wanting to prove herself capable of being home alone, and getting a new mood ring, Polly volunteers to babysit her younger brother Paxton while her parents attend a karate demo that Pierce is featured in. However, after shrinking Paxton down with them, the girls end up chasing him as he runs off to play. Meanwhile, Paxton's teddy bear "Boo-Boo" is misplaced, and causes Paxton to be upset.: Absences: Patricia Drake as Griselle Grande, Rhona Rees as Gwen Grande.
7	7	"Sugar Rush"	Brent Bouchard	Elise Allen	Hailey Kathler and James Borne	August 17, 2018	110
Polly becomes exhausted from her massive to-do list, and ends up losing her locket. Absent: Rhona Rees as Gwen Grande.
8	8	"Mission Ring: Impossible"	Jon Izen	Mark Purdy and Stu Reid	James Borne, Jason Armstrong, and Krista-Marie Porter	August 10, 2018 (Note: Family Channel aired on August 10, 2018 in Canada); August 19, 2018	107
The Pockets head to the beach and Polly wants to test her new deep sea submarine, but when her Dad's special anniversary gift goes missing, Polly and her friends have to do whatever it takes to find it.
9	9	"The Badgering"	Jon Izen	Elise Allen	John Young and Melissa Allen	August 19, 2018	111
While at girl scouts camp in the hopes of promoting to a higher rank, the girls find Lila incapable of certain outdoor skills, and that a ghost named the Pearl Lady supposedly haunts the grounds. However, a disguised Griselle and Gwen snatch the locket, trapping the girls at doll-size, and the girls apply Lila's fashion savvy skills to track them down. Along the way, the girls discover that Shani's older cousin, Tanisha, was going to use the Pearl Lady ghost as a prank.
10 11	10 11	"A Night to Remember"	Brent Bouchard Jon Izen	Shea Fontana	Gloria Jenkins and Raven Molisee Rick Hoberg and Sam To	August 25, 2018	112 113
Part 1: Griselle disguises herself as a mayoral candidate. Polly and the girls plan a school dance while trying to deal with a suspicious new friend. Part 2: Polly and pals must stop Griselle's mayoral quest to put Littleton in a dome, but their efforts are hampered by Polly's locket being on the fritz. Polly must team up with newcomer Nicolas to repair the locket to defeat Griselle.
12	12	"The Con Job"	Brent Bouchard	Jacquie Walters and Taylor Cox	Dave Wiebe and Sam To	August 13, 2018 (Note: Family Channel aired on August 13, 2018 in Canada); August 26, 2018	108 (Note: This episode was number: 111 for Zap2it)
Polly and her pals head to Sci-Fi Con for a day of fun, and Shani's fan knowledge becomes vital when they have to find a kidnapped actress and save the day.
13	13	"Club Flub"	Jon Izen	Mark Purdy and Stu Reid	Desirae Salmark and Sidne Marat	August 15, 2018 (Note: Family Channel aired on August 15, 2018 in Canada); September 2, 2018	109
When Polly and pals fail to attract members to their Animal Club, they head to the forest to find exotic animals and recruit more members. But Polly loses her pocket sized friends and must find her new animal friends before they're pocket size forever. Absence: Ellen Kennedy as Geni.
14	14	"Swimsational"	Brent Bouchard	Barb Haynes	Desirae Salmark and Sidne Marat	September 9, 2018	114
Polly wants to throw the ultimate pool party but soon learns that family is more important than looking cool in front of your friends when her attempts to be in two places at once turns disastrous for both the pool party and her Dad's pitch. Absences: Patricia Drake as Griselle Grande, Rhona Rees as Gwen Grande.
15	15	"Pocket Poltergeist"	Brent Bouchard	Jacquie Walters and Tayler Cox	Jeff Bittle and Melissa Allen	September 16, 2018	116
When Pierce's racket interferes with the Posse's attempts at making a movie for a contest to win a new camera, Polly, Lila, Shani and Nicholas fake a ghost attack, which prompts Pierce to call in a paranormal investigator named Paranormal Patty, whose tech picks up on the locket's mystical energy. But when Pierce learns Patty intends to destroy the house to protect the neighborhood, he and Polly team up to fake getting rid of the ghost (portrayed by Shani) to save their home before their parents find out about the trouble Pierce caused. Absences: Patricia Drake as Griselle Grande, Rhona Rees as Gwen Grande.
16	16	"Short Cuts"	Jon Izen	Robin Stein	Luke Gustafson and Megan Willis	September 23, 2018	117
After Shani mistakenly blames Polly for using the locket's power to get an unfair advantage in the science fair, Shani impulsively throws her own project into the trash - and now the girls must retrieve it while staying one step ahead of Griselle.
17	17	"Snowball Effect"	Brent Bouchard	Mark Purdy and Stu Reid	Gemma Findlay and Sam To	September 30, 2018	118
Polly and her grandmother go to a ski lodge to compete in a race. However, Gwen and Griselle disguise themselves as Russian skiers Drizelle and Gwendolforfia to get another chance at taking Polly's locket.
18	18	"A Little Fright"	Jon Izen	Robin Stein	Hailey Kathler and James Borne	October 7, 2018	115
Polly and pals are hoping for the best Halloween ever, but Griselle going undercover in the Haunted Hayride to steal the locket may hinder their plans.
19	19	"Socially Awkward"	Jon Izen	Mark Purdy and Stu Reid	Desiree Salmark and Tori Grant	October 14, 2018	119
Polly and Shani are annoyed after Lila has suddenly become obsessed with Blair Delaware, a female internet celebrity and Lila's crush, which has caused her to forget about a fundraiser she should be participating in at school. Guest appearance: Chiara Zanni guet stars as Blair Delaware. Absences: Patricia Drake as Griselle Grande, Rhona Rees as Gwen Grande.
20	20	"Brotherly Love"	Brent Bouchard	Barb Haynes	Hailey Kathler and James Borne	October 21, 2018	120
To make the biggest bowl in the skate park open to everyone, Polly and her pals must beat skate king, Devin and his crew (which includes Pierce) in a skate competition. Absence: Ellen Kennedy as Geni.
21	21	"A Yacht of Problems"	Jon Izen	Mark Purdy and Stu Reid	Jeff Bittle and Melissa Allen	October 28, 2018	121
Polly thinks a trip to an island off the coast of Littleton will be a great time to use her new yacht. But, strange things start happening and an unknown force renders the locket useless, so Shani must lead them through a mysterious temple to fix it. Guest appearance: Tosca Hopkins guest stars as Carla Carson. Absences: Patricia Drake as Griselle Grande, Rhona Rees as Gwen Grande, Ellen Kennedy as GenI.
22	22	"Tiny Escape"	Brent Bouchard	Barb Haynes	Luke Gustafson and Megan Willis	November 4, 2018	122
Pocket-sized Polly frees her friends from inside a pencil case and desk drawer. While small, she also helps her teacher in an important dance competition.
23	23	"Spa Daze"	Jon Izen	Jacquie Walters and Taylor Cox	Maxime Chiasson and Sam To	November 11, 2018	123
Grandma convinces Polly and Mom to "unplug" for a day at the spa, but things go south quickly when Polly loses her mom's valuable phone and has to go on a tiny mission to retrieve it-all while evading Griselle's moves to steal the locket!
24	24	"Gwen the Great"	Brent Bouchard	Corey Powell	Desirae Salmark and Tori Grant	November 18, 2018	124
When audience members in Peanut's Pit Stop boo Gwen's terrible karaoke performance, Polly and her friends feel bad for her and decide to help Gwen find something she excels at to boost her confidence and make her feel good about herself. Absence: Ellen Kennedy as GenI.
25 26	25 26	"Unlocketing the Past"	Jon Izen and Brent Bouchard	Shea Fontana	Hailey Kathler and James Borne	November 24, 2018	125 126
When Polly's locket goes on the fritz, she must dive into the history of Prudence Pocket to uncover the secret source of Pockite, which powers the locket's shrinking ability. Guest star: Kathleen Barr as Gruesome Grunwalda.

=== Season 2 (2020) ===
No. overall	No. in season	Title	Directed by	Written by	Storyboard by	Original release date
27	1	"Bringing Down the House"	Brent Bouchard	Jacquie Walters	Desirae Salmark	November 15, 2020
27	1	"Animal Quackers"	Ishi Rudell	Shea Fontana	Tori Grant	November 15, 2020
"Bringing Down the House:" When Polly tries to test the limits of her powers, she accidentally shrinks her house and its inhabitants to nano-size. She and the girls have to get everyone back to normal before anyone realizes what's going on. "Animal Quackers:" Polly helps put on an animal adopt-athon, and the tiny animals get loose. Polly and Shani must corral the animals before Polly's parents find out.
28	2	"Kerpow Kerplunk"	Ishi Rudell	Christopher Gentile	Michael Tisserand	November 15, 2020
28	2	"Ice Ice Polly"	Brent Bouchard	Mark Purdy	Chelsea Woolman	November 15, 2020
"Kerpow Kerplunk:" In her attempt to spend more time with Lila, Polly tries to join Lila at kerpow class. When it's time for the levelling-up demo, Polly rigs the "kerpow bot" to be easier for her, but accidentally sets it to destroy. "Ice Ice Polly:" It's a summer heatwave and Polly's attempt to cool off ends up freezing her whole house -- and her family. She has to keep them frozen until Shani finds a way to scientifically thaw them without disastrous consequences.
29	3	"One Fly Day"	Brent Bouchard	Shea Fontana	Renee Howerton	November 15, 2020
29	3	"Feeling Fishy"	Ishi Rudell	E. Merrill Hagan	Megan Willis	November 15, 2020
"One Fly Day:" When Polly discovers a fly who only lives for 24 hours, she sets out to make its short life amazing. But when all the things that Polly loves fail to interest the fly, Polly learns the fly has a totally different idea of "amazing." "Feeling Fishy:" When Polly's sub is mistaken for a rare fish by a marine biologist, Polly and Shani must escape the aquarium.
30	4	"How Grandma Got Her Bag Back"	Ishi Rudell	Julia Prescott	David Dick	November 15, 2020
30	4	"Old Haunts New Friends"	Brent Bouchard	Mark Purdy	Selena Marchetti	November 15, 2020
"How Grandma Got Her Bag Back:" A luggage mix up leads to love when Grandma's luggage is mistakenly taken by a gentleman Grandma met on the plane to Cosmo City. "Old Haunts New Friends": When Grandma and the girls check into the "pocket floor" of a fancy hotel, everything is set for luxurious relaxation -- until a mouse steals Polly's locket. It's a wild chase through the hotel to get the locket back.
31	5	"Boatload of Tiny"	Ishi Rudell	Christopher Gentile	Peter MacAdams	November 15, 2020
31	5	"Taxi Trouble"	Brent Bouchard	Jacquie Walters	Marta Demong	November 15, 2020
"Boatload of Tiny:" Polly takes on the snooty Augustus Uberrich in a tiny boat race across Cosmo Park Lake. But when Augustus cheats with his tricked-out boat, Polly learns that winning isn't everything. "Taxi Trouble:" When Polly leaves her cell phone in a taxi cab, she and Lila must go tiny and brave the traffic of the big city to get it back.
32	6	"Big Babies"	Ishi Rudell	Taylor Cox	Desirae Salmark	November 15, 2020
32	6	"Big Trouble for Little Lila"	Brent Bouchard	Mark Purdy	Tori Grant	November 15, 2020
"Big Babies:" On their way to do "grown-up things" and prove they're not babies, Polly and pals must take a shortcut through the baby playground. "Big Trouble for Little Lila:" A locket problem causes Polly's head to shrink and Lila's body to shrink on the day of Lila's big spartan race.
33	7	"Carnival Caper"	Brent Bouchard	Christopher Gentile	Michael Tisserand	November 15, 2020
33	7	"Bear Necessities"	Ishi Rudell	Julia Prescott	Aynsley King	November 15, 2020
"Carnival Caper:" At the local amusement park's carnival games section, Polly sees that her long-lost plush monkey is one of the prizes. But when Polly discovers the games are rigged, Polly and pals go on a pocket-sized adventure to find the culprit. "Bear Necessities:" At the suggestion from Grandma to "get away from it all," Polly goes camping. But their plans go awry when Grandma and the RV are taken by a bear.
34	8	"Sweet Birthday Shani"	Ishi Rudell	E. Merrill Hagan	Renee Howerton	November 15, 2020
34	8	"Vet On It"	Brent Bouchard	Jacquie Walters	Megan Willis	November 15, 2020
"Sweet Birthday Shani:" It's Shani's birthday and Polly, Lila and Nic want to give her the best gift by recreating her favorite, discontinued candy. "Vet on It:" When Peaches has to spend the night at the vet, Polly realizes Peaches doesn't have her favorite toy. Polly goes pocket-sized to get Peaches her toy.
35	9	"Princess Predicament"	Ishi Rudell	Kate Leth	Selena Marchetti	November 15, 2020
35	9	"Lost & Unfound"	Brent Bouchard	Christopher Gentile	David Dick	November 15, 2020
"Princess Predicament:" Nic thinks Polly's new book is just for girls, but when he's "captured," the girls must take the knowledge they learned from the book to save him. "Lost & Unfound:" After Polly's Dad installs a super alarm system, Polly must evade the security system and break into her own house.
36	10	"The Big Cheat"	Ishi Rudell	Mercedes Valle	Marta Demong	November 15, 2020
36	10	"Horsin' Around"	Brent Bouchard	Mark Purdy	Peter MacAdams	November 15, 2020
"The Big Cheat:" Lila is trying out for the Littleton Kerpow demo team, but when Polly sees that one of the competitors is cheating, she must stop the cheat. "Horsin' Around:" Shani breaks Lila's favorite seashell, but instead of coming clean, she tries to hide the mess and instigates an impromptu trip to the beach.
37	11	"Ant Polly"	Ishi Rudell	Julia Prescott	Desirae Salmark	November 15, 2020
37	11	"Halloween Queen"	Brent Bouchard	Kate Leth	Tori Grant	November 15, 2020
"Ant Polly:" Shani wants to win the Ant Fair, but when she discovers she's been consulting an old book for tips, she needs Polly's help to modernize her ant farm. "Halloween Queen:" Polly wants to be the Queen of Halloween, but her tiny party turns into a big disaster when she tries to make it fit Nic's scary preference instead of following her own heart.
38	12	"A Very Moving Story"	Brent Bouchard	Mercedes Valle	Aynsley King	November 15, 2020
38	12	"Pinata Problems"	Ishi Rudell	Julia Prescott	Michael Tisserand	November 15, 2020
"A Very Moving Story:" When Polly's plan to give the water park a makeover goes awry, she learns that friends don't have to solve all their friends' problems. "Pinata Problems:" It's Pierce's birthday and Polly wants to avoid his party, but she gets stuck in the pinata.
39	13	"Area Fifty None"	Ishi Rudell	Kate Leth	Megan Willis	November 15, 2020
39	13	"Happy Polly Days"	Brent Bouchard	Shea Fontana	Renee Howerton	November 15, 2020
"Area Fifty None:" Polly will discover that conspiracy-minded Nic is actually onto something when she and Shani find themselves trapped in Area Fifty None. "Happy Polly Days:" Polly is so obsessed with getting the perfect presents for everyone in Littleton, that she overlooks her new friend Big.

=== Season 3: Rainbow Funland Adventures (2021–22) ===
No. overall	No. in season	Title	Directed by	Written by	Storyboard by	Original release date
Part 1
40	1	"Big Ideas"	Ishi Rudell	Kate Leth	Selena Marchetti	September 29, 2021
Polly and Big must evade the hall monitor to make it to class after a last minute redo of their geography project takes longer than expected.
41	2	"Outfoxed"	Brent Bouchard	Nilah Magruder	Sujan Chowdhury	September 29, 2021
Polly and her pals help a den of arctic foxes when a new ski slope disturbs their home.
42	3	"Stalling"	Ishi Rudell	Kara Lee Burk	Byungchan Kang	September 29, 2021
Shani's horse has fleas, so Polly and Lila go pint-sized for a showdown with the pesky pests before Shani's first horse show.
43	4	"Paw Parazzi"	Brent Bouchard	Shea Fontana	Brian Wong	September 29, 2021
Polly enjoys some newfound fame - and lots of free stuff - when a video of her pup Peaches goes viral.
44	5	"The Legend of Panda Beach"	Ishi Rudell	Lila Scott	Alex Greychuck	September 29, 2021
Polly, Lila and Nic go to Panda Beach to hunt for lost treasure, but they have to bring little Paxton along.
45	6	"Escape the Escape"	Brent Bouchard	Kara Lee Burk	Grahaeme Cowie	September 29, 2021
Polly is convinced that her brother Pierce took her special mermaid doll and follows him into the hardest escape room in town to prove it.
46	7	"Long Lost Friend"	Brent Bouchard	Eric Rogers	Brian Wong	September 29, 2021
Polly realizes she had discovered Grandma's long lost pet parrot and sets out to reunite them.
47	8	"Sherlocket Holmes"	Ishi Rudell	Christopher Gentile	Graeme MacDonald	September 29, 2021
When Polly and her pals enter a film festival, she must channel the movie character she's chosen to play - the super sleuth Sherlocket Holmes.
48	9	"The Big Ball"	Ishi Rudell	Kara Lee Burk	Grahaeme Cowie	September 29, 2021
Polly goes pocket-sized to help guide Big through her family's super fancy Bigowski Ball.
49	10	"The Unicorn Queen"	Ishi Rudell	Eric Rogers	Chris LaBonte	September 29, 2021
A flat tire puts Polly's family vacation with her friends on pause and lands them in a kooky place.
50	11	"Kingdom Keys"	Brent Bouchard	Kate Leth	Jeff Bittle	September 29, 2021
When a ride at Rainbow Funland breaks down, Polly and her pals use tiny power to try and fix the ride.
51	12	"Slumber Polly"	Ishi Rudell	Julia Yorks	Selena Marchetti	September 29, 2021
While on a scavenger hunt, Polly and her crew discover that someone familiar is behind all the problems at Rainbow Funland.
52	13	"Magic is in the Heart"	Brent Bouchard	Julia Yorks	Graeme MacDonald	September 29, 2021
Ahead of the opening of Rainbow Funland's new ride, Polly and her pals must reunite the amusement park's creators.
Part 2
53	14	"The Locketness Monster"	Brent Bouchard	Mike Carrier and Taylor Cox	Elise Stevens	January 9, 2022
After discovering legendary monsters really exist in their lake, Polly and friends use their powers to save the creatures from all the pollution.
54	15	"Computer Bug"	Ishi Rudell	Lila Scott	Carlo Marcelo	January 9, 2022
Polly and Shani use their shrinking power to hop into a hard drive when a computer bug infects Shani's laptop. Note: This is the first episode where someone shrinks to microscopic size.
55	16	"Lepre-Can't"	Ishi Rudell	Mike Carrier and Taylor Cox	Yu Su	January 9, 2022
Polly learns to stand up for herself when her new leprechaun friend starts taking advantage of her hospitality.
56	17	"Don't Judge a Bookworm By Its Cover"	Brent Bouchard	Mike Carrier and Taylor Cox	Chris LaBonte	January 9, 2022
Polly and her pals try to catch up to a very hungry bookworm before he eats through the entire library.
57	18	"Shani Like a Star"	Brent Bouchard	Lila Scott	Selena Marchetti	January 9, 2022
Polly and Lila shrink down to join Shani at a performing arts camp so she'll have some pals to help her fit in.
58	19	"Putt-Putt Petcare"	Ishi Rudell	Mike Carrier and Taylor Cox	Megan Willis	January 9, 2022
Polly has her hands full when all the pets she's looking after go missing on a mini-golf course.
59	20	"The Great Swimposal"	Brent Bouchard	Mike Carrier and Taylor Cox	Elise Stevens	January 9, 2022
Grandma's synchronized swimming teammate, Richard, is planning to propose and asks Polly for help holding onto the engagement ring.
60	21	"Double Trouble"	Ishi Rudell	Kara Lee Burk	Aynsley King	January 9, 2022
While babysitting Lila's twin sisters, Polly uses her pocket-sized powers to check off their to-do list before bed and become their favorite sitter.
61	22	"The Crow Must Go On"	Brent Bouchard	Lila Scott	Peter MacAdams	January 9, 2022
Polly must recover Shani's good luck trinket to make sure her friend's debut theater performance goes off without a hitch.
62 63	23 24	"Grandma's Big Day"	Ishi Rudell Brent Bouchard	Mike Carrier and Taylor Cox	Elise Stevens Megan Willis	January 9, 2022
Part 1: Polly provides a little pocket magic to make sure that Richard and Grandma's wedding day is extra perfect. Part 2: With help from new dolphin friends and underwater pocket magic, Polly saves Grandma's big day on the high seas.
64 65	25 26	"Polly Drops the Ball"	Ishi Rudell Brent Bouchard	Lila Scott	Peter MacAdams Aynsley King	January 9, 2022
Part 1: Shani and Lila help Polly try to check off the rest of her New Year's resolution list before the year ends. Part 2: Polly finally reveals the secret of her locket to her family during the New Year concert.

=== Season 4: Summer of Adventure (2022) ===
No. overall	No. in season	Title	Directed by	Written by	Storyboard by	Original release date	Prod. code
Part 1
66	1	"The Incredible Shrinking Dad"	Ishi Rudell	Eric Rogers	Chelsea Woolman	April 1, 2022	401
Polly shrinks down her parents to convince them she's got everything under control with her magical powers. Note: This is the second episode where someone shrinks down to microscopic size.
67	2	"The Secret Life of Pamela Pocket"	Ishi Rudell	Lila Scott	Elise Stevens	April 1, 2022	402
After Polly learns about her mom's former roller derby life, she tries to convince her to skate back into the rink.
68	3	"Camp Kerpow"	Brent Bouchard	Jacquie Menville	Peter MacAdams	April 1, 2022	403
Polly and Shani use their pocket powers when Bella needs their help training one of the younger students at Camp Kerpow.
69	4	"Save the Roller Dance"	Ishi Rudell & Deborah Copeland	Mike Carrier & Taylor Cox	Morgan Shandro	April 1, 2022	404
Polly's determined to keep her parents' roller dancing tradition alive when she learns the sport might be removed from the Littleton Games.
70	5	"Small Business"	Brent Bouchard & Deborah Copeland	Mike Carrier & Taylor Cox	Graeme MacDonald	April 1, 2022	405
Polly has the perfect system to deliver hot chocolate to the fans in the soccer stadium. But everyone wants some of Irene's ice cream instead.
71	6	"Hamster Hijinks"	Ishi Rudell	Klara Woldenga	Alex Greychuck	April 1, 2022	406
The gym gets raided by rodents right before Polly's new friend Hazel can participate in a big gymnastics event.
72	7	"Flamingo Frenzy"	Ishi Rudell	Callie C. Miller	Elise Stevens	April 1, 2022	407
Polly gets swept up in the latest video game craze after Nic and Shani introduce her to "Flamingo Frenzy."
73	8	"Hatching a Plan"	Brent Bouchard	Lila Scott	Megan Parker	April 1, 2022	408
Polly helps turtle hatchlings journey safely to the sea - and avoid the beach volleyball courts of the Littleton Games.
74	9	"Rabbit, Foot"	Brent Bouchard	Mercedes Valle	Peter MacAdams	April 1, 2022	409
Polly, Lila and Shani must find a star soccer player's missing pet to save the closing ceremony of the Littleton Games.
75	10	"Smarty Pax"	Brent Bouchard & Deborah Copeland	Jacquie Menville	Cat Tang	April 1, 2022	410
Polly and Pierce tag along with their pocket powers to make sure Pax has a great first day of preschool.
76	11	"Fred Vs Foot"	Ishi Rudell & Deborah Copeland	Mike Carrier & Taylor Cox	Grahaeme Cowie	April 1, 2022	411
Polly and Shani get ready to party and celebrate their friendship after beaming up to a Pluto Day celebration.
77	12	"Coin Op Co-Op"	Ishi Rudell	Callie C. Miller	Chris Johnston	April 1, 2022	412
Pierce and Polly accidentally spend Richard's special quarter collection during a day at the arcade.
78	13	"The Big Surprise"	Ishi Rudell	Nilah Magruder	Megan Willis	April 1, 2022	413
When Polly finds out her friends are planning a surprise birthday party for her, she can't help meddling with the preparations.
Part 2
79	14	"Mini Marshmellow"	Brent Bouchard	Mike Carrier & Taylor Cox	Megan Parker	August 1, 2022	414
While the Pockets are camping in the woods, Polly and her mom investigate a marshmallow thief - and find a tiny baby unicorn.
80	15	"Nothing But The Tooth"	Ishi Rudell	Nilah Magruder	Cat Tang	August 1, 2022	415
Polly, Lila and Shani meet a Tooth Fairy-in-Training who might lose her wings if she doesn't complete her assignments by morning.
81	16	"Pizza Pierce"	Ishi Rudell	Marie Cheng	Grahaeme Cowie	August 1, 2022	416
Polly gets stuck in a cheesy mess when she and Shani help Pierce make and deliver pizzas so he can win a fundraising competition.
82	17	"Custard Kitten"	Brent Bouchard	Mike Carrier & Taylor Cox	Megan Willis	August 1, 2022	417
When Bella fosters a group of adorable, snuggly kittens, Polly struggles to win over shy cat Custard.
83	18	"The Sweet Life"	Brent Bouchard & Deborah Copeland	Eric Rogers	Chris Johnston	August 1, 2022	418
Inspired to make the greatest cake ever, Polly and her dad use their pocket powers to try to win a cake baking competition.
84	19	"Hedgehog Wild"	Brent Bouchard	Lila Scott	Graeme MacDonald	August 1, 2022	419
After accidentally losing Pierce's hedgehog, Polly tries to distract her brother with a day of fun at her pocket-sized inflatable theme park.
85	20	"The Otter Way"	Brent Bouchard	Leanna Dindal	Morgan Shandro	August 1, 2022	420
A petri dish containing Shani's algae experiment gets swiped by a playful otter right before her presentation, so Polly gets tiny to help her find it.
86	21	"Exceptional Eats"	Brent Bouchard	Leanna Dindal	Elise Stevens	August 1, 2022	421
When business is slow at Peanut's Pitstop, Polly lands the diner a guest spot on a TV show and tries to impress the host.
87	22	"Apple Puppin'"	Ishi Rudell	Callie C. Miller	Alex Greychuck	August 1, 2022	422
Polly and Pierce get competitive during an apple picking outing - and end up losing Peaches the dog during a contest.
88	23	"Follow the Apples"	Ishi Rudell	Lila Scott	Megan Parker	August 1, 2022	423
Polly and Lila volunteer to help the animal shelter put on a costume show to get the animals adopted at the Howl-oween Pet Fair.
89	24	"Guactober Fest"	Ishi Rudell	Mike Carrier & Taylor Cox	Paul Kassab	August 1, 2022	424
Polly accidentally loses Richard's secret ingredient in a customer's basket and must team up with Grandma to track it down.
90 91	25 26	"Mermaid Kingdom"	Brent Bouchard	Klara Woldenga Monica Dollive	Cat Tang Grahaeme Cowie	August 1, 2022	425 426
Part 1: On the way to drop older brother Pierce at college, Polly and Pierce make an unexpected pitstop to the Mermaid Kingdom. Part 2: Polly, Pierce and mermaid friend Monroe are trapped in the Squid Lord's lair.

=== Season 5: Hidden Worlds (2024) ===
No. overall	No. in season	Title	Directed by	Written by	Storyboard by	Original release date
Part 1
92	1	"Sole Mates"	Brent Bouchard	Mike Carrier & Taylor Cox	Sidne Marat	March 25, 2024
93	2	"Major Cat-titude"	Thom McKenna	Rose Bueno	Matthew Perry	March 25, 2024
94	3	"Trouble Brewing"	Brent Bouchard	Ian Rickett	Kent Webb	March 25, 2024
95	4	"Runaway Bun"	Thom McKenna	Monica Dollive	Rachel Green	March 25, 2024
96	5	"The Ravishing Rose Bush"	Brent Bouchard	Megan Gonzalez	Cid Snyder	March 25, 2024
97	6	"Magic Mayhem"	Thom McKenna	Callie C. Miller	Katie Cordina	March 25, 2024
98	7	"Scheming Statues"	Alex Garcia Munoz & Desirae Salmark	Callie C. Miller	Grahaeme Cowie	March 25, 2024
99	8	"The Phantom of the Popera"	Brent Bouchard	Megan Gonzalez	Sara Kim	March 25, 2024
100	9	"The Lulufoofoo Switcheroo-roo"	Thom McKenna	Nick "Rocket" Rodriguez	Cynthia Davila-Chase	March 25, 2024
101	10	"Float On"	Alex Garcia Munoz & Desirae Salmark	Ian Rickett	Maca Gil	March 25, 2024
102	11	"Whoa Nelly"	Brent Bouchard	Alex Cabrera-Aragon	Matthew Perry	March 25, 2024
103	12	"Feeling E-Raced"	Thom McKenna	Mike Carrier & Taylor Cox	Sidne Marat	March 25, 2024
104	13	"Double Duchess"	Alex Garcia Munoz & Desirae Salmark	Monica Dollive	Kent Webb	March 25, 2024
Part 2
105	14	"Castles and Unicorns"	Brent Bouchard	Nick "Rocket" Rodriguez	Rachel Green	July 22, 2024
106	15	"Water-Mel"	Thom McKenna	Mike Carrier & Taylor Cox	Katie Cordina	July 22, 2024
107	16	"Furever Friends"	Alex Garcia Munoz & Desirae Salmark	Kate Leth	Cid Snyder	July 22, 2024
108	17	"Koala-ified Sitter"	Brent Bouchard	Andi Shu Hester	Grahaeme Cowie	July 22, 2024
109	18	"Out for Delivery"	Thom McKenna	Megan Gonzalez	Sara Kim	July 22, 2024
110	19	"Dance Machine"	Alex Garcia Munoz & Desirae Salmark	Ian Rickett	Cynthia Davila-Chase	July 22, 2024
111	20	"Paws the Music"	Brent Bouchard	Alexandra Franklin & Marc Muszynski	Maca Gil	July 22, 2024
112	21	"Run Lila Run"	Thom McKenna	Megan Gonzalez	Matthew Perry	July 22, 2024
113	22	"About Time"	Alex Garcia Munoz & Desirae Salmark	Rosemary Contreras	Caroline Quach	July 22, 2024
114	23	"Littleton Pet Games"	Brent Bouchard	Alexandra Franklin & Marc Muszynski	Rachel Green	July 22, 2024
115	24	"The Perfect Party"	Thom McKenna	Callie C. Miller	Samantha Grant	July 22, 2024
116 117	25 26	"Adventures in Dragon-sitting"	Brent Bouchard Thom McKenna	Ian Rickett Mike Carrier & Taylor Cox	Cid Snyder Katie Cordina	July 22, 2024

=== Season 6: Adventures in Rio (2024–25) ===
No. overall	No. in season	Title	Original release date
118	1	"Whiskered Away"	September 6, 2024
119	2	"Welcome to Rio!"	September 6, 2024
120	3	"A Dog with a Dream"	April 19, 2025
121	4	"A Tiara Time Mystery"	April 25, 2025
122	5	"A Little Inspiration"	April 26, 2025
123	6	"Shani of Tomorrow"	May 2, 2025
124	7	"Pet Matchmaker"	May 3, 2025
125	8	"Varsity Blues"	May 9, 2025
126	9	"2 Cool 2 Jake"	May 10, 2025
127	10	"Sunny, With a Chance of Pterodactyls"	May 16, 2025
128	11	"Coco-cano"	May 17, 2025
129	12	"Nic's Cat-Tastrophe"	May 23, 2025
130	13	"Bringing Home Baby"	May 24, 2025
131	14	"Panda Panic"	May 31, 2025
132	15	"Cove Calamity"	June 1, 2025
133	16	"The Face of Fame"	June 7, 2025
134	17	"President Shani"	June 8, 2025
135	19	"Revenge of the Uni-Dragon"	June 14, 2025
136	19	"Just Roll with It"	June 15, 2025
137	20	"Dulce for a Day"	July 13, 2025
138	21	"Jumpin' Jumpsuit"	July 19, 2025
139	22	"Super Puppy"	July 20, 2025
140	23	"Snow Way Home"	July 26, 2025
141	24	"Shani and the Stars"	July 27, 2025
142	25	"Grandma's Good Night"	August 2, 2025
143	26	"Maximum Fun"	August 3, 2025
144	27	"Party Animal"	August 9, 2025
145	28	"Lost at Sea"	August 10, 2025
146	29	"Sparkle Cove Slumber Party"	August 16, 2025
147	30	"Livin' Out Loud"	August 17, 2025
148	31	"Lila Explains It All"	August 23, 2025
149	32	"Shani's School for Performing Pets"	August 24, 2025
150	33	"Pranks a Lot Bunnies"	September 14, 2025
151	34	"Elegant Horn Salon"	September 21, 2025
152	35	"Fun for All"	September 28, 2025
153	36	"A Trophy in Time"	October 5, 2025
154 155	37 38	"Pockite Powers Unite"	October 12, 2025 (part 1); October 19, 2025 (part 2)

== Film (2023) ==
Title	Directed by	Written by	Storyboard by	Original release date
"Polly Pocket: Sparkle Cove Adventure"	Brent Bouchard & Thom McKenna	Leanna Dindal, Kate Leth, & Callie C. Miller	Katie Cordina, Cid Snyder, Grahaeme Cowie, Sara Kim, Maca Gil, & Cory Mathis	August 21, 2023
Polly explores an enchanting secret island filled with mysterious wonders, including the pockite crystal that allows her to magically change size.
