= Broken Saints =

2001 flash-animated web series

- Created by: Brooke Burgess
- Written by: Brooke Burgess
- Directed by: Brooke Burgess
- Voices of: Janyse Jaud; Kirby Morrow; Michael Dobson; Colin Foo; David Kaye; William B. Davis; Brooke Burgess; Greg Anderson; P.J. Brookson; Jan Bos; Scott McNeil; Michael Robinson; Ryan Crocker; Kevin O'Grady; Patricia Drake; Trace Ventura; Revard Dufresne; Nathan Schwartz; Adam Henderson; James G. Wolfe; Daniel Borowiecki; Melissa Brancato; Paul Skrudland; Dee Daniels; Chris Olson; Leanne Koehn; Herbert Duncanson; Adam Fulton; Chrystal Leigh; Nick Kline; Kim Violato; David Malik; Andrew West; Ian Kirby; Taylor Moll; Amanda Marier; Tara Wilding; James Thomson; Gabriel Hodge; Tobias Tinker; Scott Kinniburgh; Jamie Bell
- Theme music composer: Tobias Tinker
- Composers: Tobias Tinker; Quentin Grey; Adam Fulton
- Country of origin: Canada
- Original language: English
- No. of seasons: 1
- No. of episodes: 24

Production
- Running time: 9–83 minutes

Original release
- Release: January 17, 2001 – July 13, 2003

Broken Saints is a partially Flash-animated horror drama web series by Brooke Burgess, with technical direction from Ian Kirby and artwork by Andrew West. First released online from 2001 to 2003, it is one of the earliest examples of a motion comic. Characters for the most part remain in static poses and dialogue is indicated by speech balloons, but animated sequences are used to switch scenes and help advance the story, while music and sound effects are included.

It tells the story of four strangers in different regions of the world – Shandala from Fiji; Raimi from the United States; Oran from Iraq; and Kamimura from Japan – all of whom suddenly experience an apocalyptic vision or series of apocalyptic visions. All four set out to uncover the origin and/or meaning behind their experiences.

After its online release was concluded in 2003, the series was released as a limited-edition DVD in 2005, featuring voice narration, upgraded artwork for the first 12 episodes, some alternate technical effects for those episodes and subsequent ones, and numerous special features. A subsequent mass-market DVD release was distributed in 2006 by 20th Century Fox. It is the same as the first release, but features upgraded artwork for the first 13 episodes (compared to only the first 12 on the previous DVD release), as well as the alternate technical effects, and many more special features, including audio commentary for every episode.

While Broken Saints was met with unanimous critical acclaim, it has remained relatively obscure since its initial release. Its word-of-mouth reverence from fans and subsequent popularity on Newgrounds has led the series to develop a cult following.

== Characters ==
Shandala Nisinu: Commonly Shandala, she is an 18-year-old altruist living an idyllic life. She came to the uncharted Fijian island of Lomalagi (or "Heaven") as an infant floating on the waves and was adopted by the island's wise tribal chief Tui Nisinu. The mysterious circumstances around her birth will return to haunt all who come to know her—and affect the whole world. In the DVD version, Shandala's voice is provided by Emmy-award winner Janyse Jaud.

Raimi Matthews: Raimi is a 24-year-old Canadian non-practicing Catholic who lives in the fictional Coast City, United States. He works developing software and security (and then finding ways around it) for a global telecommunications and pharmaceutical company called Biocom, which has just irked him with a sudden unexplained termination from an important project. The electronic information he cracks from his company leads him on a personal mission that ultimately brings the four strangers together. Raimi is voiced by Kirby Morrow.

Oran Bajir: Oran is a 29-year-old devout Muslim from Baghdad, Iraq. At the outset of the story he is involved in an armed resistance against Western domination, left to guard a small bunker in solitude. With nothing to do but read the Qur'an, Oran begins to doubt his mission and himself. Oran is voiced by Michael Dobson.

Kamimura: Also known as "Kami", he is an elderly Shinto mystic and former Buddhist from rural Japan. He was estranged from his former Buddhist order over an incident concerning relics given him that he swore to protect. Goku, a former student, had demanded the box, in order to sell its contents. However, Kamimura had given his word and his word was his bond. Kamimura's voice actor is Colin Foo.

== Production ==
Each of the chapters was written and directed by Burgess, with Kirby doing the technical direction and West providing the artwork. The series was co-produced in the first year (first six episodes) by Vancouver-based Switch Interactive with Budget Monk Productions. Illustrator Andrew West and Flash designer/programmer Ian Kirby were employees of Switch Interactive, and brought the concept to the studio's attention in 1999.

== Format and publication ==
Broken Saints is broken into 24 Flash-animated episodes that were released from 2001 to 2003. It totals about 12 hours of running time.

The chapters vary in length and become progressively longer, many with two or three acts. The shortest is nine minutes long, while the longest, the 24th episode "Truth", is five acts long with a prologue and epilogue, totaling 1 hour and 23 minutes.

It is one of the earliest examples of a motion comic. Like a comic, characters for the most part remain in static poses and dialogue is indicated by speech balloons. However, rather than exclusively using sequential panels, animated sequences are used to switch scenes and help advance the story. The series also includes sound effects and music, composed by Tobias Tinker and Quentin Grey with classical pieces by Mozart and others. Samples of songs from Montreal-based band Godspeed You! Black Emperor were looped extensively in the soundtrack, and much of the dialogue, particularly in the 14th episode, "Harbingers," is taken from the spoken word portions of their songs (some directly, and some slightly altered). The group is listed in the credits at the end of "Harbingers" under "Loop Worship."

Dani Atkinson of Sequential Tart found the work difficult to categorize, saying, "I'm honestly not sure what Broken Saints is. There's a lot of ongoing debate regarding how much animation a webcomic can contain before it stops being a comic, but I'd have to say Broken Saints has crossed that line, however blurry the line may be. But it uses elements of comics storytelling, particularly in the early chapters, and throughout the story it uses word balloons and captions instead of spoken dialogue. So it's a comic that moves, if there is such a thing, or it's a movie you read."

Two DVD versions have been released. The first was released in 2005, and featured improved or wholly redrawn art for the first 12 chapters, numerous featurettes, commentary on select chapters, and voice narration for all dialogue. The voice actors included William B. Davis, David Kaye, Kirby Morrow, and Emmy Award-winner Janyse Jaud. Burgess himself provided character voices. This version is now out of print. The second DVD version, released in 2006, is being distributed internationally by 20th Century Fox. It is the same as the previous version, with a few slight differences, including a reworking of the artwork for the 13th episode, "Insertion," and commentary for every chapter.

The creators of Broken Saints received a grant from the Canadian government to assist in publishing the work to DVD.

== Future ==
On November 30, 2008, Brooke Burgess announced on the official Broken Saints blog that a TV series was on the way. In the blog post was also embedded a trailer. The trailer was later revealed to be a pitch for a series.

In 2015, on the series Facebook group, Burgess said he had a specific idea for a possible second season that would pick up 30 years after the events of the first.

== Awards and reviews ==
Broken Saints is the winner of various awards including:

- 2001 Pixie Award Winner: Best Website that Incorporates Motion
- Flash in the Can 2002: People's Choice Award
- Flash Forward 2002: People's Choice Award & Best Cartoon
- Netfestival Brazil 2003: People's Choice Award
- 2003 Audience Award at the Sundance Online Film Festival
- 2004 Horizon Interactive Awards: Best in Show
- Telefilm Canada Grant Award 2004
- 2005 Annual Rue-Morgue Awards: Most Innovative Concept
- 2005 Canadian New Media Awards: Producer of the Year (Brooke Burgess)

Reviewing for Sequential Tart in 2004, Dani Atkinson gave the work an 8 out of 10. They advised patience in the slower parts, such as the beginning, which "develops very slowly... taking several chapters to build momentum and develop the characters.... But as the comic nears the end, the plot kicks into high gear, and everything starts clicking into place. I spent the final chapter glued to the screen and teetering on the edge of my seat." They called the soundtrack "atmospheric." But for online viewing, they complained about the Flash format which offered no pause or rewind function. Atkinson described the art as "strongly manga influenced, but done in full colour with rough, sketchy line work" and noted that in later chapters, the animation becomes more elaborate and is "less like a comic and more like a movie." They called the story "emotionally intense, and very consciously spiritual," and said, "It's a work with high ideals and high hopes for itself. I respect that." The review noted a lot of cursing and "a few really disturbing images."
