= Peter O'Meara =

Irish actor

- Born: 27 October 1969 (age 56); Thurles, County Tipperary, Ireland
- Occupation: Actor
- Years active: 1995–present

Peter O'Meara (born 27 October 1969) is an Irish actor. Known for his work on the London stage he came to the screen in the HBO series Band of Brothers playing the role of Lieutenant Norman Dike. He garnered a popular following on USA TV series Peacemakers as Detective Larimer Finch bringing the science of the future to the old west opposite Tom Berenger as Marshal Jared Stone. For this, he received the Western Heritage Bronze Wrangler award.

== Career ==
O'Meara went on to guest star in season 4 of Alias as international arms dealer Martin Bishop opposite Jennifer Garner. He has also guest starred on CSI: NY with Gary Sinise, Without a Trace with Anthony La Paglia and The Forgotten with Christian Slater. All three are produced by Jerry Bruckheimer. He recently recurred on the Sky/Cinemax action series Strike Back as Major Brian Donoghue.

O'Meara has appeared in the independent features Haven with Orlando Bloom, Resident Evil: Extinction, with Milla Jovovich and the acclaimed British First World War drama My Boy Jack with Daniel Radcliffe and Carey Mulligan

O'Meara took minor roles in the indie comedy The Grand with Ray Romano and the film Leap Year opposite Amy Adams and John Lithgow.

He is friend to Justin Long in the New Line Cinema hit romantic comedy He's Just Not That Into You playing Bill opposite Ginnifer Goodwin. The CD film soundtrack contains a special extra date scene between the two.

In 2013, O'Meara joined series four of acclaimed award-winning Irish television drama Love/Hate in the role of conflicted dentist Andrew. He has recurred in the American drama series, NCIS, as Marco Sali head of interpol starting Season 12 in the episode, "The Lost Boys".

He then played the dramatized lead role of Benedict Arnold, the controversial revolutionary war hero, in Talon Films 2021 documentary Benedict Arnold: Hero Betrayed.

In 2025, O'Meara appeared in the horror film Uncontained.

== Filmography ==
=== Film ===
- 2004: Haven – Officer Franklin
- 2004: Ichabod! – Ichabod Crane
- 2007: The Grand – Dave Esme
- 2007: Resident Evil: Extinction – British Envoy
- 2009: He's Just Not That Into You – Bill
- 2010: Leap Year – Ron
- 2015: Traders – Anthony Grogan
- 2017: The Beautiful Ones – Reginald
- 2018: We Have Always Lived in the Castle – Sam Clarke
- 2021: Benedict Arnold: Hero Betrayed (Documentary) – Benedict Arnold
- 2025: Uncontained – Brett Carson

=== Television ===
Peter O'Meara television credits
Year	Title	Role	Notes	Ref.
1999	Aristocrats	United Irish Soldier 2	TV miniseries. Masterpiece Theatre	
2001	Band of Brothers	Lt. Norman S. Dike, Jr.	TV miniseries	
2003	Peacemakers	Detective Larimer Finch	9 episodes	
2004	CSI: NY	Paul Stryzewski	1 episode	
2005	Alias	Martin Bishop	Episode: "The Awful Truth" (S4.E3)	
2006	Without a Trace	Jim Heller	1 episode	
2007	My Boy Jack	Captain Vinny	TV movie (U.K.)	
2010	The Forgotten	Conner Hennessey	1 episode	
2011	Strike Back	Maj. Brian Donoghue	2 episodes	
2013	Love/Hate	Andrew	6 episodes	
2015	NCIS	Marco Sali	3 episodes	
2016	Code Black	Captain Boris Vasilievsky	1 episode	
