= Peacemakers (TV series) =

Television show filmed in Vancouver

- Genre: Crime fiction
- Created by: Larry Carroll and Rick Ramage
- Starring: Tom Berenger; Peter O'Meara; Amy Carlson
- Country of origin: United States
- No. of seasons: 1
- No. of episodes: 9

Production
- Production companies: Michael R. Joyce Productions; USA Cable Entertainment; Outpost Productions

Original release
- Network: USA Network
- Release: July 30 – October 8, 2003

Peacemakers is an American crime fiction television series about forensic science in the Old West. It was filmed in Vancouver, British Columbia, Canada. The series premiered July 30, 2003, on the USA Network. The show was cancelled after one season of nine episodes.

== Plot ==
Peacemakers depicts law enforcement efforts in Silver City, Colorado, during the waning years of the American Old West. Deputy United States Marshal Jared Stone (Tom Berenger) and his colleague, private detective Larimer Finch (Peter O'Meara), are the primary law officers. Katie Owen (Amy Carlson), the town's undertaker and mortician, assists them as a forensic pathologist. Silver City is a silver boom town embracing new technologies, including a telephone exchange with long-distance service to Denver, and electric lighting.

Stone is a decorated soldier of the American Civil War, a former gunfighter, expert tactician and marksman. His jurisdiction covers a larger region centered on Silver City. Finch is an experienced criminologist and trained forensic scientist, a graduate of Yale University who completed post-graduate work at Cambridge University and interned with Scotland Yard. He was formerly an operative of the Pinkerton Detective Agency, speaks fluent Chinese, and is skilled with hand-to-hand combat.

Finch came to Silver City to investigate a murder committed in a private railway car at the Silver City rail depot. To avoid reassignment to a strike breaking detail, he resigned from the agency and remained in Silver City, where he uses his knowledge of fingerprinting, ballistics, photography, chemistry and scientific analysis to aid Marshal Stone in his investigations. Owen, a former medical student, was forced to take over the family mortuary business after the accidental deaths of her parents. Her medical skills make her a valuable ally and friend to Stone and Finch.

== Cast ==
=== Main cast ===
- Tom Berenger as Marshal Jared Stone
- Peter O'Meara as Detective Larimer Finch
- Amy Carlson as Katie Owen
- Colby Johannson as Chipper Dunn
- Bellamy Young as Twyla Gentry
- Bob Gunton as Mayor Smith
- Barbara Tyson as Luci Prescott
- Jim Shield as Jake Freeman
- Anthony Ulc as Vic Simmons
- Matthew Bennett as Steward Harrison
- Greg Cipes as Will Johnston

=== Notable guest stars ===
- James Remar as Cole Hawkins
- Duncan Fraser as CW Wentworth
- Gabrielle Rose as Kathryn Wentworth
- Jonathan Scarfe as Dean Wilder
- Neil Maffin as Christopher Hamilton
- Anthony Harrison as Officer Hardy
- Marcus Hondro as Babbles
- Dahlia Salem as Sabrina Hamilton
- Damon Johnson as Pete
- Steven Rudy as Telegraph Operator
- Colton Schock as Frank
- Greg Anderson as Mr. Chastain
- Julie Benz as Miranda Blanchard

== Episodes ==
No.	Title	Directed by	Original release date
1	"Pilot"	Larry Carroll	July 20, 2003
2	"29 Seconds"	Jean De Segonzac	August 6, 2003
3	"No Excuse"	Michael Switzer	August 13, 2003
4	"Dead to Rights"	Rick Wallace	August 20, 2003
5	"Legend of the Gun"	Michael Switzer	September 10, 2003
6	"The Perfect Crime"	Michael Robison	September 17, 2003
7	"The Witness"	Larry Carroll	September 24, 2003
8	"Bad Company"	Jerry Levine	October 1, 2003
9	"A Town Without Pity"	Richard Compton	October 8, 2003

== Awards ==
- Nominated for a 2004 Canadian Society of Cinematographers Award for "Best Cinematography in TV Drama".
- Won the 2004 "Bronze Wrangler" Western Heritage Award for "Outstanding Factual or Fictional Drama".

== See also ==
- Hec Ramsey
