= Uncontained =

2025 Zombie film directed by Morley Nelson

- Official release poster
- Directed by: Morley Nelson
- Written by: Morley Nelson
- Produced by: Charlie Gerszewski; Chris Goodson; Rachel Palashewski; Courtney Blythe Turk
- Starring: Morley Nelson; Peter O'Meara; Hayley LeBlanc
- Cinematography: Bo Hakala
- Edited by: Charlie Gerszewski
- Production company: Gravel Road
- Distributed by: Bloody Disgusting; Cineverse
- Release date: March 11, 2025 (United States)
- Running time: 99 minutes
- Country: United States
- Language: English

Uncontained is a 2025 American zombie horror drama film written, directed by, and starring Morley Nelson, Peter O'Meara and Hayley LeBlanc. The film explores themes of survival, family, and moral ambiguity during a viral outbreak that transforms people into zombie-like creatures. It was released on March 11, 2025, and is available for streaming on Screambox and through various digital platforms.

== Plot ==
The film opens in a remote, snow-covered forest under localized martial law following a viral outbreak that reduces humans to a rabid, feral state. A mysterious, silent drifter named Dan (credited as "The Man" and played by Morley Nelson) awakens shirtless and buried in a snowdrift. After gathering his belongings and venturing into the woodlands, he is struck by a tranquilizer blow-dart and falls into a trap. The trap was set by seven-year-old Jack (Jack Nelson) and his two-year-old sister Brooke (Brooke Nelson). The siblings have converted an extravagant, isolated cabin into a self-sustaining fortress equipped with a treadmill-powered generator. Jack, acting as his sister's heavily armed protector, confiscates Dan's gun and knife. Upon waking, Dan discovers that Jack will only return his weapons and allow him to leave if he completes essential maintenance and fortification work on the house.

As Dan performs manual tasks—including reinforcing doors, fixing a broken radio, and repairing the lighting system—a silent bond and sense of trust form between him and the children. During this time, it is revealed that a month prior to Dan's arrival, a young local couple, Donny (Brett Zimmerman) and Melanie (Courtney Blythe Turk), had stumbled upon the cabin seeking a hideout. Believing the children's parents were dead, the couple stayed under the guise of looking after them, though their intentions were heavily driven by personal gain. However, Jack maintained control of the house, locking Brooke away at night to guard a deep secret.The fragile peace of the household is threatened by two external forces: roaming packs of infected "feral" predators and a heavily armed local militia. The militia is led by a ruthless commander named Brett (Peter O'Meara), who is scouting the area with his men under the pretext of searching for his missing daughter. Brett's interactions with a local sheriff and his aggressive tactics cast an ominous shadow over the surrounding wilderness.

The narrative shifts from a quiet domestic drama into tragedy and action when the children's mother (Nicole Nelson), a Homeland Security operative, returns to the cabin. She reveals a critical secret regarding the virus: a segment of the human population possesses a unique genetic immunity that allows them to transform back and forth between a mindless, feral form and their regular, conscious human state. It is further revealed that the children's family is directly connected to the disappearance of Brett's daughter. Brett and his militia eventually track the missing daughter to the vicinity of the cabin, realizing that the seemingly abandoned children are harboring secrets. The militia attacks the compound alongside a sudden onslaught of local feral infected. Utilizing the cabin's high-tech defenses, large windows, and practical traps, Dan is forced to confront his violent past and abandon his isolationist instincts. He uses his specific survival skills to launch a violent rescue operation, engaging in a frantic battle against both the infected horde and Brett's ruthless scavengers to secure a safe escape for Jack and Brooke.

== Cast ==
- Morley Nelson as Dan
- Peter O'Meara as Brett Carson
- Courtney Blythe Turk as Melanie
- Supporting cast includes Homeland Security agents and militia members.

== Themes ==
Uncontained examines the nature of humanity in crisis, highlighting ethical dilemmas, emotional trauma, and the blurred line between human and monster. The infection in the film does not result in typical zombies but rather cyclical, partial transformations, lending a fresh take on the genre.

== Production ==
The film is Morley Nelson's feature directorial debut. A former police officer, Nelson also wrote and produced the film. The narrative focuses on atmosphere and character over action, distinguishing it from typical zombie horror.

== Release ==
Uncontained was released on March 11, 2025. It premiered on Screambox and became available in iOS, Android and on digital platforms including Amazon Prime Video, Apple TV, Google Play, Amazon Fire TV, Roku, Samsung TV Plus, Comcast and Cox.

== Reception ==
Bryan Staebell of Scare Value gave the film a rating of 3.5 over 5 and wrote; It is easy to recommend this one to people looking for a fresh take on some old ideas.
