= Polly Pocket (TV series) =

2018 TV series

- Genre: Fantasy comedy; Action; Adventure
- Based on: Polly Pocket by Mattel
- Developed by: Shea Fontana; Stephanie Betts; Shaleen Sangha; Christopher Keenan; Carlos Ramos
- Directed by: Jon Izen; Brent Bouchard; Ishi Rudell; Deborah Copeland
- Voices of: Emily Tennant; Shannon Chan-Kent; Kazumi Evans; Cherlandra Estrada; Patricia Drake; Rhona Rees; Ellen Kennedy; Ian Hanlin; Maryke Hendrikse; David A. Kaye; Vincent Tong; Kathleen Barr; Tabitha St. Germain; Nicole Oliver
- Theme music composer: Asher Lenz; Stephen Skratt
- Composer: Mike Shields
- Countries of origin: Canada; United States
- Original language: English
- No. of seasons: 6
- No. of episodes: 155 (list of episodes)

Production
- Executive producers: For Mattel Creations/Television: Christopher Keenan; Frederic Soulie; For DHX Media/WildBrain Studios: Josh Scherba; Kirsten Newlands; Marsh McCall; Judd Pillot; John Peaslee; Stephanie Betts (seasons 2–4); Shaleen Sangha (seasons 2–4)
- Producers: Ashley Koons; Lesley Crawford; Sam Harper; Stephanie Betts (season 1); Shaleen Sangha (season 1)
- Editors: Adam Kube; Shannon Archibald; Isaac Strozberg; Jessica Burton
- Running time: 22 minutes (per episode; season 1); 11 minutes (per episode; 2-part, segmented; seasons 2−6)
- Production companies: Mattel Television (Note: Began as Mattel Creations for the first season.); WildBrain Studios (Note: Began as DHX Media for the first season.)

Original release
- Network: Family Channel (Canada, season 1); Universal Kids (U.S., seasons 1−2); Netflix (U.S., seasons 2−5); Amazon Prime Video (U.S., season 6)
- Release: July 8, 2018 – October 19, 2025

Polly Pocket is a 2D-animated adventure fantasy children's television series based on Mattel's doll of the same name. It features Polly having a magical locket that allows her and her friends to shrink down to tiny sizes.

The series was originally produced by Mattel Television and WildBrain Studios for Family Channel in Canada and Universal Kids in the US before moving to Netflix in both countries from seasons 3 to 5. Season 6 was released in fall 2024 on Amazon Prime Video alongside the 66-minute special Tiny Unicorn Adventure Special.

== Characters ==
=== Main ===
- Polly Pocket (voiced by Emily Tennant) is an 11-year-old kid genius with a thirst for adventure and a desire to help people. She inherited her locket from her grandmother Penelope Pocket, trying to keep its shrinking ability a secret to avoid letting anyone use it for its power.
- Lila Draper (voiced by Shannon Chan-Kent) is Polly's fashion-savvy friend of Scottish descent who often exclaims using fashion terms and pieces. She loves fashion and finds that shrinking can be chic. She felt starts learning KerPow in the second season. Following the events of "Sparkle Cove Adventure", Polly gives her orange pockite, which allows her to change shapes. Lila is very athletic as well.
- Shani Smith (voiced by Kazumi Evans in seasons 1–2 and Cherlandra Estrada in seasons 3–6) is an African-American sci-fi nerd who formerly had stage fright, Shani serves as the peacekeeper and brains of the group. Her favorite show is "Y-Girls" and she is a follower of Nicolas' vlog. Following the events of "Sparkle Cove Adventure", Polly gives her red pockite which allows her to understand animals. Shani's first name is Swahili.
- Nicolas "Nic" Wells (voiced by Vincent Tong) is a boy in Polly's class who attempts to investigate the paranormal. In the mid-season one finale, he discovers the girls' secret, but in "A Night to Remember, Part 2", he becomes the posse's fourth member and Polly's male best friend when he helps them thwart Griselle and Gwen's plot to be mayor and take over the town and promising to keep the girls' secret safe. He is a supposed expert on all things paranormal.
- Duchess Bella Bigowski (formerly known as Big) (voiced by Rhona Rees) is Lila's KerPow rival-turned-friend who appears in season 2 and joins the posse as its fifth member in the season 2 finale. It was revealed that Bella comes from nobility, with her title being Duchess. Her aunt and uncle are the ruling family of Belldovia. Known to say, "Gym shorts".

=== Recurring ===
- Penelope Pocket (voiced by Ellen Kennedy) is Polly's grandmother and the previous bearer of the Pocket Locket. She marries Richard in the third season.
- Pamela Pocket (voiced by Maryke Hendrikse) is Polly's mother. Following the events of "Sparkle Cove Adventure", Polly gives her golden pockite.
- Peter Pocket (voiced by Ian Hanlin) is Polly's father.
- Pierce Gregory Pocket (voiced by David A. Kaye) is Polly's 16-to-17-year-old brother. It is revealed he does KerPow, in "Mommy, I Shrunk the Kid", and that he works for store owner Peanut as a delivery boy-turned-assistant manager in "A Night to Remember, Part 1". He owns a hedgehog named Blossom. Polly and Pierce seem to grow closer following the revelation of the Pocket Locket. Pierce gets ready to go to college at Cosmopolitan City University in season 4.
- Paxton Pocket (voiced by Maryke Hendrikse) is Polly's baby brother. He was the only one of Polly's relatives other than Grandma Penelope who knew Polly's secret until the end of season 3. He starts going to Le Fancy Pants Preschool in season 4. Following the events of "Sparkle Cove Adventure", Polly gives him blue pockite.
- Richard (voiced by Terry Klassen in season 2 and Dhirendra in seasons 3–6) is a man Penelope Pocket befriends and becomes romantically involved with, getting married in season 3. He later becomes aware of the Pocket family secret in season 4.
- Prudence Pocket (voiced by Rhona Rees) is the ancestor of Penelope and Polly Pocket and the founder of the town of Littleton. She discovered some of the various colors of Pockite, the known colors being purple (shrinking and growing), green (transports between locations including to other worlds), orange (shapeshift), blue (shields), red (universal communication including animals), gold (time freeze), white (changes form of objects), and pink (powers devices such as projectors).
- Melody (voiced by Maryke Hendrikse) is a teenage pop singer who becomes the girls' ally in "Tiny Power, Part 2" when she is rescued by Polly via her locket. After the two-part pilot, she didn't reappear until the season 3 finale.
- Austin Summers (voiced by Ian Hanlin) is Pierce's friend.
- CJ (voiced by Tabitha St. Germain) is Lila's friend.
- Melissa Militant (voiced by Tabitha St. Germain) is a strict Girl Scout troop leader who does things in a military boot camp fashion.
- Darlene D'Cornia (voiced by Tabitha St. Germain)
- Cheryl (voiced by Shannon Chan-Kent)
- Peanut (voiced by Ian Hanlin) is a restaurant owner known for making cupcakes. Pierce Pocket works for him as his delivery boy, and later, his assistant manager in the series' 11th episode.
- Tori (Tanisha) (voiced by Kathleen Barr) is Shani's older cousin.
- Major Kisser (voiced by Vincent Tong)
- Nathaniel D'Cornia (voiced by Peter Kelamis) is the owner of Rainbow Funland.
- Mr. Quidnunc (voiced by Peter Kelamis)
- Officer McPherson (voiced by Sam Vincent)
- Mr. Moneyweather (voiced by Michael Daingerfield) is a senior man with dark-grey hair and mustache. It was rumored that he also functions as a villain.
- Susie (voiced by Shannon Chan-Kent) is an Asian-American toddler girl.
- Lindsey (voiced by Maryke Hendrikse) is an Asian-American girl who is a few years older than Susie.
- Ms. Mense (voiced by Maryke Hendrikse)
- Sun (voiced by Shannon Chan-Kent) is a spa manager.
- Brandon (voiced by Shannon Chan-Kent) is a boy Lila helps teach Kerpow and Fatima.
- Principal Mondo (voiced by Scott McNeil) is the elementary school's quirky, eccentric but fairly strict principal.
- Miss Fuss (voiced by Nicole Oliver) is a substitute teacher at Polly's school and Ms. Demeter
- Blair Delaware (voiced by Chiara Zanni) is a social media star that Lila admires.
- Mrs. Smith (voiced by Cherlandra Estrada) is Shani's mother.
- Ms. Verite (voicrd by Cherlandra Estrada)
- Dr. Laguna (voiced by Cherlandra Estrada) is a biologist at the Littleton Aquarium.
- Maxine Morningside (voiced by Kelly Sheridan) is a news reporter.
- Margot Monrovia (voiced by Kelly Sheridan)
- Magicianna (voiced by Emily Tennant)
- Ava (voiced by Kiomi Pyke)
- Belladonna Bigowski (voiced by Kathleen Barr) is Bella's grandmother and namesake, her father's mother and matriarch of the Bigowski family.
- Mr. Bigowski (voiced by Paul Dobson) is Bella's father.
- Lord Edward (voiced by Paul Dobson) is Belladonna's assistant.
- Mrs. Bigowski (voiced by Diana Kaarina) is Bella's mother.
- Cecilia Bigowski is Bella's great-aunt.
- Ricki Roller (voiced by Alexandra Quispe) is a former rival of Pamela Pocket.
- Jordan (voiced by Alexandra Quispe)
- Ingrid Nilson as Coco and Vera Draper, Lila's baby twin sisters.
- Mr. Draper (voiced by Mark Hildreth) is the father of Lila, Coco and Vera.
- Grandmaster Khan (voiced by Mayumi Yoshida) is Lila and Bella's Kerpow teacher.
- Hazel (voiced by Annie Chen) is Grandmaster Khan's young granddaughter. She learns of Polly's Locket and promises not to tell.
- Marvin (voiced by Alvin Sanders) is the stubborn director of the Littleton Games.
- Ice Cream Irene (voiced by Rebecca Husain) is a teenager who serves ice cream at the Littleton Games and Polly lets in on her secret.
- Consuela Fargo (voiced by Maria J. Cruz) is a woman from Animal Control.
- Sunny Moon (voiced by Nicole Anthony) is an athletic woman who competes in the Littleton Games. She specializes in many sports, including volleyball, soccer, and basketball among others. In "Sunny, With a Chance of Pterodactyls", Sunny becomes one of the few who know about Polly, Lila, and Shani's Pockite Powers after she accidentally turns herself into a pterodactyl with Lila's Pockite bracelet.
- Principal Snootykins (voiced by Brenda Crichlow) is the head of Le Fancy Pants Preschool.
- Jethro (voiced by Jesse Inocalla) is a teacher at Le Fancy Pants Preschool.
- Sam (voiced by Jesse Inocalla)
- Bigfoot (voiced by Brian Drummond) is a resident of Area Fifty-None.
- Bill (voiced by Brian Drummond) is a bat creature.
- Fred (voiced by Ian James Corlett) is a Leprechaun.
- Rosie (voiced by Ashleigh Ball) is a small alien from Pluto.
- Carmen (voiced by Aria DeMaris)
- Genevieve is an alien turtle friend of Aesop.
- Frances (voiced by Nicole Anthony) is a tooth fairy-in-training.
- Monroe (voiced by Nicole Anthony) is a mermaid.
- Dr. Merriweather (voiced by Kira Tozer)
- Benedict Cobb (voiced by Adam Nurada)
- Audrey (voiced by Erin Mathews)
- Matteo (voiced by Marco Grazzini) is an old rival of Richard's.
- The Mermaid Queen is Monroe's mother and ruler of the Mermaid Kingdom.
- Queen Madelyn is a mermaid who knows Prudence Pocket.
- Plum (voiced by Brian Drummond) is a seahorse Cuddly who helps uphold the rules of the Sparkle Cove Tournament. Becomes part of the Sparkle Cove Council, and grants Polly the power of Pocket Vision.
- Tine (voiced by Michael Daingerfield) is an anthropomorphic unicorn who emcees the Sparkle Cove Tournament.
- Tarak (voiced by Chirag Noik) is the previous Protector of Sparkle Cove.
- Jake (voiced by Vincent Tong) is a boy from Cosmopolitan City who wants to go on adventures and protect animals and the environment. Becomes part of the Sparkle Cove Council. He has green pockite for teleportation. He goes onto appear in season 5, where he's revealed to be into magic. He and Polly are shown to have a crush on each other in many episodes.
- Rahim (voiced by Briton T. Maxwell) is a deaf boy who becomes part of the Sparkle Cove Council.
- Lou (voiced by Hanna Hafer) is a boy who becomes part of the Sparkle Cove Council.
- Gilda (voiced by Elishia Perosa) is the daughter of Tarak, a girl who becomes part of the Sparkle Cove Council.
- Cobalt (voiced by Philip Tan) is a penguin Cuddly who helps Jake.
- Ruby (voiced by Emily Tennant) is a sea turtle Cuddly who helps Rahim.
- Citrus (voiced by Shannon Chan-Kent) is a narwhal Cuddly who helps Lou.
- Nugget (voiced by Cory Doran) is a dolphin Cuddly who helps Gilda.
- Beluga (voiced by Michael Daingerfield) is whale Cuddly who helps Tarak.
- Dustiny (voiced by Andrea Libman) is a dust bunny.
- Chip (voiced by Annie Chen)
- Queen Coco Chantal (voiced Gigi Saul Guerrero)
- Armand (voiced by Meegwun Fairbrother)
- Rosanna (voiced by Kelly Sheridan) is Shani's rose bud.
- Gabby Morningside (voiced by Princess Davis)
- Maxine Morningside (voiced by Kelly Sheridan)
- Dr. Ortiz (voiced by Gabriela Torres) is a librarian.
- Prince Alistair (voiced by Paul Dobson) is Bella's cousin and heir to the throne of Belldovia.
- Susan (voiced by Shannon Chan-Kent) Is and the good unidragon.

=== Villains ===
- Griselle Grande (voiced by Patricia Drake) is the main antagonist of the series and a 60-year-old woman from England, she was Penelope's college roommate who discovered the Pocket Locket's abilities from Penelope and tried to take it from them. The two fought but broke the locket, making Griselle win it after the two went their separate ways. She spent years using her science to replicate its powers but failed, until the day when she discovered Polly Pocket had found it and reactivated its powers. She and Gwen now try to take the locket to conquer Littleton by shrinking its citizens and trapping them in a model city called "Grandeville". She eventually gets arrested at the end of "The Badgering", after her plan to become the town's new mayor, steal Polly's locket, and shrink the town while covering it in an energy bubble failed, and Nicholas helped Lila and Shani expose Griselle's secret plans to the world. But after doing community service, she resumes her hunt for the locket while also wanting revenge on Polly and her friends, starting with "A Little Fright" onwards. After the season 1 finale, she and Gwen didn't reappear until the episode "Adventures in Dragon-sitting Part 2".
- Gwen Grande (voiced by Rhona Rees) is the secondary antagonist of the series, Griselle Grande's granddaughter and Polly's rival-turned-friend, Polly's rival inside and outside of school. In the series' 7th episode, "The Con Job", she helps the girls escape to avoid Griselle ruining their one-day off from Polly-hunting. After the season 1 finale, she and her grandmother didn't reappear until the episode "Adventures in Dragon-sitting Part 2".
- Grunwalda Grande (voiced by Kathleen Barr) is the overarching antagonist of the series and the Irish ancestor of Griselle and Gwen Grande.
- Barb Payne (voiced by Kathleen Barr) is the villain of "The Con Job" who is a former actress who is angry at her co-star, Rocco Sage, for being cast in a movie after Barb was cut out from the movie. She kidnaps Rocco and ties her to a missile, hoping she will die if the missile fails to launch. Shani tries to reason with Barb, but she is not convinced and doesn't believe her. She later is arrested.
- Paranormal Patty (voiced by Tabitha St. Germain) is a paranormal investigator whose only appearance is in "Pocket Poltergeist" when Pierce, believing to have been haunted by a ghost calls her in, unaware it was the Pocket Posse pulling a prank. Aside from her equipment almost ratting out Polly's secret, she tried to destroy the Pocket house in an attempt to get rid of the ghost before Polly arranged for her and Pierce to "banish" it (Shani via voice-acting and special effects) with a spirit dance.
- Devin (voiced by Jason Michas) is a teenage kid who thinks he is the king of the advanced bowl. He is first seen in the episode "Brotherly Love". Devin thinks that Polly and the other young kids should stay in the kid bowl but Polly doesn't like his idea, so they decide to have a skate-off.
- Mr. Scheeman (Voiced by Jim Byrnes) is a shady businessman who conned Nicolas into journeying to Almost Dead-Man's Island, hoping the boy's vlog would spread rumors about a haunted temple and keep competing businesses from taking root there. His magnet crane caused Polly's powers to glitch until Shani found and disabled it. He stole a sample of genuine "Bigfoot" hair from Nic until Shani stole it back in secret.
- Carla Carson (voiced by Tosca Hopkins) is the helpmate to Mr. Scheeman
- Ruth (voiced by Emily Tennant)
- Augustus (voiced by Travis Turner)
- Cordelia (voiced by Shannon Chan-Kent)
- Chad (voiced by Brian Doe)
- Squid Lord (voiced by Ian Hanlin) is an enemy of the Mermaid Kingdom.
- Dreya (voiced by Cherlandra Estrada) is a bad unidragon queen.
- Beatrice (voiced by Emily Tennant) is frog singer.
- Butler (voiced by Travis Turner) is the helpmate to Augustus.
- Frillyanna (voiced by Christina Sicoli) is a rude purple unicorn who hates humans.

=== Pets ===
- Farley is Darlene's pet ferret.
- Stella (voiced by Ian Hanlin) is Penelope Pocket's pet parrot.
- Sir Harry is Belladonna's pet Sphynx cat.
- Peaches is Polly's pet dog.
- Bonita is Lila's pet rabbit.
- Captain Colliwoggles (voiced by Brian Drummond) is Shani's pet cat.
- Aesop (voiced by Brian Drummond) is Shani's pet alien turtle.
- Galloshky is Gwen's female pet rat who helps Griselle and Gwen to get Polly and steal her locket but she's too late.
- Blossom is Pierce's pet hedgehog.
- Thunder is one of Hazel's five pet hamsters.
- Foot is Sunny Moon's pet rabbit.
- Apple (voiced by Sam Vincent) is a three-legged dog Bella adopts.
- Freddie is a Scottish Terrier dog Penelope adopts.
- Sally (voiced by Lili Beaudoin) is Nic's pet red-eyed tree frog.

== Episodes ==
Season	Episodes	Originally released		
Season	Episodes	First released	Last released	Network
1	26	July 8, 2018	November 25, 2018	Family Channel (Canada); Universal Kids; Netflix (worldwide); YouTube (worldwide)
2	13	November 15, 2020		Family Channel (Canada); Universal Kids; Netflix (worldwide); YouTube (worldwide)
3	26	September 29, 2021	January 9, 2022	Netflix (worldwide); YouTube (worldwide)
4	26	January 9, 2022	August 1, 2022	Netflix (worldwide); YouTube (worldwide)
5	26	March 25, 2024	July 22, 2024	Netflix (worldwide); YouTube (worldwide)
6	38	September 6, 2024	October 19, 2025	Amazon Prime Video (worldwide); YouTube (worldwide)

== Broadcast ==
The show's first season premiered on Family Channel in Canada and on Netflix in the United States on July 8, 2018, and May 1, 2020 and on American television via Universal Kids on July 1, 2019, with the latter airing the second season to air alongside it back-to-back. The series has since aired on Universal Kids and Netflix in the United States with most of the episodes also appearing via its dedicated user handle on YouTube. From the second season to date, website sources also reveal that the series was picked up for television and/or streaming broadcast in over 12 countries and territories worldwide.

On June 13, 2019, WildBrain announced a second season in development with Mattel with children's media-focused publication, The Toy Book, revealing on October 20, 2020, that Mattel and WildBrain renewed the series for more episodes without stating whether it was for a new season or not; the show's second season was released on Netflix on November 15, 2020.

From the third to fifth seasons, the series moved to Netflix, but still retained the free episode access on YouTube. The third season, as Rainbow Funland Adventures premiered on September 29, 2021 and January 9, 2022, in equal halves of episodes and the fourth season, as Summer of Adventure, was released on April 1, 2022, and August 1, 2022 – all on Netflix in the U.S.

A special, Sparkle Cove Adventure, premiered on August 21, 2023, on Netflix.

The fifth season, as Hidden Worlds, had its first half released on Netflix on March 25, 2024, and its second half released on July 22, 2024.

The sixth and final season was released on Amazon Prime Video from September 6, 2024, to October 19, 2025.
