= Greg Anderson (actor) =

Canadian actor (born 1961)

- Born: April 5, 1961 (age 64); Newcastle, New Brunswick, Canada
- Education: Lee Strasberg Theatre and Film Institute
- Occupation: Actor

Greg Anderson (born April 5, 1961) is a Canadian stage and screen actor.

== Early life and education ==
Anderson was born on April 6, 1961, in Newcastle (now Miramichi), and was raised in Chatham Head, New Brunswick. He grew up and attended school in Duncan, British Columbia. Anderson studied at the Lee Strasberg Theatre and Film Institute.

== Career ==
Although an established stage actor, he is best known for his roles on television shows such as Stargate SG-1 (6 episodes), Stargate: The Ark of Truth, The 4400 (2 episodes), Tru Calling, and The X-Files. In 2006, he played Günter Guillaume in the Canadian premiere of Michael Frayn's play Democracy.

== Filmography ==
=== Film ===
Year	Title	Role	Notes
2008	Stargate: The Ark of Truth	Prior #1	

=== Television ===
Year	Title	Role	Notes
1990	Super Force	S.P.L.A.T. Member	2 episodes
1993	Cobra	Limo Driver	Episode: "Hostage Hearts"
1995	The X-Files	Photographer	Episode: "Clyde Bruckman's Final Repose"
1996	Strange Luck	Security Guard	Episode: "Healing Hands"
1997, 1998	Dead Man's Gun	Bartender / Niles Milgram	2 episodes
1998	Millennium	Det. Munsch	Episode: "The Pest House"
1998	Sleepwalkers	Young Joel	Episode: "Passed Imperfect"
1998	The Net	Editor	Episode: "Death of an Angel"
1999	The New Addams Family	Halloran	Episode: "The Undercover Man"
2000	The Outer Limits	Dealer	Episode: "The Gun"
2000	Seven Days	FAA Supervisor	Episode: "Deloris Demands"
2001–2003	Broken Saints	Papa Tui	6 episodes
2001–2007	Stargate SG-1	Various roles	6 episodes
2003	Peacemakers	Mr. Chastain	Episode: "Bad Company"
2004	Traffic	Shipping Agent	3 episodes
2004	Commander's Log	Bastaard	Television film
2004	The Dead Zone	Senator Marshall	Episode: "Total Awareness"
2004	Romeo!	Mr. Frink	2 episodes
2005	Tru Calling	Professor Seidel	2 episodes
2006	Meltdown: Days of Destruction	Mick	Television film
2006	Men in Trees	Affable Man	Episode: "Pilot"
2007	The 4400	Lloyd	2 episodes
2012	House of Lies	Partner #2	Episode: "Business"
