= Larry Carroll (director) =

American film director and painter (1950–2015)

- Born: 1950-1951; Pittsfield, MA
- Died: December 5, 2015 (age 64); Los Angeles, California
- Occupations: Director; painter; educator
- Known for: Sundog Productions, Peacemakers, "Sam Kinison: Why Did We Laugh?"

Larry Carroll was a director, painter and educator who directed hundreds of television commercials and many hours of television series.

Larry was born in the Berkshires of Massachusetts where he grew up studying theatre and fine arts. He received his bachelor's degree in Theatre Arts from the University of Florida.

After working as an art director/producer for various advertising agencies for many years, Carroll started directing commercials for Sundog Productions, a company he founded with offices in Detroit and Los Angeles. In that time, Carroll produced and directed hundreds of commercials for a wide range of clients including Ford, Chevrolet, Buick, Chrysler, Dodge, GMC, ABC TV, Domino's Pizza, AC/Delco, Charles Schwab and numerous others.

Carroll also wrote, directed, and edited an award-winning, feature-length documentary on the late comedian Sam Kinison. The film, entitled Sam Kinison: Why Did We Laugh?, ran on HBO and won the Chris Award, the highest honor from the Columbus International Film Festival, the Telly for Best Documentary, the Best Director Award at the New York International Film and Video Festival, as well as several other awards.

Carroll then went on to direct episodic television, including the pilot for Peacemakers, a series he co-created for USA Network. The pilot was the second most watched premiere in cable television history. Recently, Carroll completed a short film titled "Sword" for Canon Inc.

He continued to pursue his love of painting and exhibited in numerous galleries, including a series of oil paintings and a short film titled Soldiers at the third annual GROUP W ARTISTS exhibit in Pittsfield, Massachusetts.

Carroll's painting Egg in Space was selected for exhibition in Second Time Around: The Hubcap as Art at the Museum of the Shenandoah Valley. Over 1000 artists entered hubcap paintings and sculptures of which 260 were selected for the show.

He also directed a 10-minute short film about the Landfillart project, the idea that gave birth to the hubcap exhibit which screened at the Museum Exhibit opening in the fall of 2014.

Carroll joined the faculty at the University of Southern California where he taught Directing and Producing in the School of Cinematic Arts, in addition to continuing to paint both in oil and watercolor until his death on December 5, 2015. He is survived by his wife and two daughters.
