= Patricia Drake =

Canadian actress

- Occupation: Actress

Patricia Drake is a Canadian actress working on TV and in animated shows, mostly with Ocean Studios in Vancouver, British Columbia, Canada.

== Filmography ==
=== Anime ===
- Black Lagoon as Balalaika
- Dead Dead Demon's Dededede Destruction as Yoko Izumida
- Human Crossing as Kazuya's mother
- Inuyasha as Koyuki/Yuki-on'na, Kannon/Salamander
- Ranma ½ as Yang Gui-fei
- Maison Ikkoku as Naomi, Yagami's Neighbor, Kyoko's mother
- Tetsujin 28 as Ayako Umenokoji

=== Television ===
Year	Title	Role	Notes
1998	Cold Squad	Turner's Lawyer	Episode: "Stephanie Jordan"
1998	Honey, I Shrunk the Kids: The TV Show	Clan Woman	Episode: "Honey, We're Past Tense"
1999	Sabrina: The Animated Series	Additional voices	3 episodes
1999	Strange World	Coroner	Episode: "Down Came the Rain"
1999–2000	Beggars and Choosers	Debbie	16 episodes
1999–2000	First Wave	Cade's Mother / Ellen	2 episodes
2000	Beast Machines: Transformers	Strika	6 episodes
2001	The Lone Gunmen	Martha Ashley	Episode: "Three Men and a Smoking Diaper"
2001	Night Visions	Flight Attendant	Episode: "The Passenger List"
2001–2002	Ultimate Book of Spells	Headmistress Crystalgazer	26 episodes
2002–2003	Broken Saints	Cielle	Credited as Patty Drake
2003–2006	The Dead Zone	Wedding Planner / Cop	2 episodes
2003	Out of Order	Barb	6 episodes
2003	X-Men: Evolution		Episode: "Sins of the Son"
2004	Stargate SG-1	Lucia Tarthus	Episode: "Fallout"
2004	Andromeda	Jonah's Lieutenant	Episode: "The Weight: Part 2"
2005–2008	Being Ian	Vicky Kelley, Grandma Kelley, additional voices	Main cast
2005	The 4400	Dr. Hodler	Episode: "Rebirth"
2005	Da Vinci's City Hall	Farini	Episode: "Isn't Very Pretty But You Can Smoke It"
2006–2008	Class of the Titans	Hera, Artemis, Hecate, Tourist	22 episodes
2006	Godiva's	Mathilde Krause	Episode: "The Tempting Spice"
2006	Psych	Elaine	2 episodes
2006	Saved	Lucia	Episode: "Secrets and Lies"
2008	The Guard	Stress Counselor	3 episodes
2009	Kid vs. Kat	Additional voices	6 episodes
2009	Geronimo Stilton	Sally Rasmaussen	
2010	Human Target	Queen	Episode: "Victoria"
2013	Emily Owens, M.D.	Nurse Dottie	3 episodes
2013	Motive	Dr. Jillian Anders	Episode: "Public Enemy"
2013	Cult	Lissa	Episode: "The Kiss"
2013–2018	My Little Pony: Friendship Is Magic	Twilight Velvet, Ms. Peachbottom, Cruise Pony, Yigrid	3 episodes
2014	The Killing	Dr. Lockhart	Episode: "Dream Baby Dream"
2015	Arrow	Judge	Episode: "Left Behind"
2016	Beat Bugs	Martha	
2018	Supernatural	Coroner	Episode: "Gods and Monsters"
2018, 2024	Polly Pocket	Griselle Grande	
2019	Ninjago	Sorla	6 episodes
2019	Lego Jurassic World: Legend of Isla Nublar	Diane, Tourist, Park Vet	
2019	See	Overseer	2 episodes
2021	Motherland: Fort Salem	Magda Verger	4 episodes
2021	Midnight Mass	Joanie	Miniseries; 4 episodes
2022–2024	Superman & Lois	General Hardcastle	5 episodes
2022	The Midnight Club	Cataract Woman	Recurring; 7 episodes
2025	Happy Face	Alice	Episode: "Don't Dream"

=== Film ===
Year	Title	Role	Notes
2000	Monster Mash	Stella Tinklemeister	
2006	John Tucker Must Die	Coach Williams	
2007	Barbie as the Island Princess	Queen Danielle, Mama Pig	Direct-to-video
2010	Barbie: A Fashion Fairytale	Aunt Millicent	
2011	Barbie: A Perfect Christmas	Aunt Millicent	
2015	Barbie in Princess Power	Queen Karina	

=== Video games ===
Year	Title	Role	Notes
2007	Barbie as the Island Princess	Queen Danielle	
2010	Dead Rising 2	Bibi Love	
2011	Dead Rising 2: Off the Record	Bibi Love	
2013	Dead Rising 3	Bibi Love	
