= The Marvelous World of Shani =

American fashion doll brand from Mattel

- First appearance: 1991
- Last appearance: 1993
- Created by: Kitty Black Perkins

In-universe information
- Full name: Shani
- Occupation: Doctor
- Family: See: List of Barbie's friends and family

The Marvelous World of Shani, also known as Shani & Friends or simply Shani (or Maroni as it was known in Europe), was a fashion doll line manufactured by the American toy company Mattel, Inc. and launched in 1991. The principal designer of the dolls was longtime Mattel toy designer Kitty Black Perkins, also responsible for designing 1980's First Black Barbie doll, and many other African American dolls in the Barbie line.

The series exclusively featured black characters, and was Mattel's first attempt to produce more ethnically correct black dolls with accurate Afrocentric features, varying shades of skin tones to represent the diversity of skin color in the black community, and varying hair colors and textures. The line was created as a result of criticism aimed at Mattel at the lack of diversity and that the black dolls in the Barbie line were almost always featured with Eurocentric features.

The line initially debuted completely independently from the Barbie line, with its own accessories and characters, until the Shani line was discontinued and then retconned into the Barbie line as her friends. As a result of the lines merging, Shani brand dolls are retroactively considered Barbie dolls.

== Product and History ==
Long before the Shani line debuted in stores, Mattel had already been making African American fashion dolls for 24 years, with their first black doll being the Colored Francie doll from 1967, and then Barbie's friends Christie and Julia (the latter being based on the hit TV series of the same name), released in 1968 and 1969 respectively. They were soon followed by Brad, the first African American male doll in the Barbie franchise who was introduced as a boyfriend for Christie. Mattel, would continue to release more black dolls in the Barbie line, including a new couple named Cara and Curtis, and the first black versions of Barbie and Ken in 1980 and 1982 respectively. These dolls were met with criticism from the public, specifically the black community, for reusing Barbie face sculpts with Eurocentric features and having no variety in hair texture.

Seeing the demand and need for more fashion dolls that accurately represented African American culture, Mattel hired researchers Dr. Darlene Powell-Hopson and Dr. Derek Hopson to help them refine their products, which included them conducting a study entitled Implications of Doll Color Preferences among Black Preschool Children and White Preschool Children, in which it was found that black children always picked the white dolls as the prettiest because they thought the black dolls were ugly. The results of these tests inspired Mattel to create a doll line of black dolls that would more accurately represent black culture and be positive role models for children.

In a New York Times interview with Dr. Powell-Hopson, she revealed that Mattel wanted guidance from researchers on how to reinforce Shani for children in a positive way, and she commented that this showed how much respect Mattel had for the black community. The line initially debuted with 3 characters, Shani, Asha, and Nichelle, with the back of the box stating that the name Shani is Swahili for the word marvelous. Asha's name is Swahili for the word life, and Nichelle was named after Star Trek actress Nichelle Nichols. The dolls were all made with new face sculpts that were more Afrocentric, and with various skintones including light (Asha), medium (Shani), and dark (Nichelle). The dolls had nearly identical figures to Barbie dolls, only with more shapelier bodies. The body mold used for the dolls was a new and unique mold created in 1991 that would eventually be used for Barbie dolls as well. The dolls were also designed to be able to wear Barbie fashions and accessories as well, to encourage more variety in doll play for children that also owned Barbie dolls already.

The dolls in the first wave were released in September 1991, wearing big and fancy ball gowns that could be converted into different outfits including a bathing suit and a cover-up (Shani), a jacket and a mini-dress (Asha), and a ballerina gown (Nichelle). The dolls also came with a hair pick and a multi-purpose accessory that could be converted into a hair clip, a belt, and a necklace. A pair of heels was also included with each doll, Nichelle notably getting two pairs of shoes, with the second pair being ballerina slippers that could be tied around her ankles. Lastly, each doll also included a sheet of cardboard cutouts inside the box that could be cut out and folded together to make doll accessories. In addition to the dolls, Shani fashion packs were also included, each one being an outfit that could be converted into different looks. In the doll's first commercial, a Caucasian white girl is shown playing with the Shani dolls alongside two black girls, a move encouraged by Dr. Powell-Hopson to show that black dolls could have universal appeal. Dr. Powell-Hopson also hoped that Shani would last long enough to have more careers, as the doll was marketed as being a doctor in addition to a fashion model. The dolls were also designed with having gold accents in mind for their fashion, as a representation of the importance of gold in African culture, as the color means high status, wealth, royalty, fertility, and spiritual purity.

The dolls retailed for varying prices of $12.99 to $19.99 in stores. According to Perkins, Shani is originally from Africa but now lives in the United States. Though the dolls were met with initial strong sales and generally positive reviews, they still faced their fair share of criticism. Dr. Nickole C.J. Scott, writing for the Orlando Sentinel, was particularly critical of the doll's body types and proportions, a criticism that Barbie had similarly faced in the past. She wrote: "Like Barbie has done for years, this new doll is sending the message that if I don't look like this I won't be accepted." She continued to write: "She may have black skin, but her body is still too reflective of a fantasy white woman's, some critics say." Debra Mitchell, Mattel's product manager at the time, defended the Shani dolls and countered that, in reference to the criticism that Shani's hair is too straight, that they don't plan on changing her hair anytime soon, as Mattel's research concluded that children liked playing with dolls that had long hair, even black children.

In 1992, another character would be introduced into the Shani line in the form of Jamal, designed as a boyfriend for the Shani doll. The doll debuted with a golden tuxedo, which could be converted into a casual outfit, a pair of dress shoes, a cloth briefcase, a bowtie, two ties, a cummerbund, a sheet of cardboard cutout accessories just like the first three dolls, and a mustache. Jamal would then be clean shaven in subsequent releases of the doll. In addition to a boyfriend, Shani was given an accessory in the form of a Corvette, which was simply a gold re-coloring of the 1980s Barbie Corvette. The line would also get a second wave in the form of the Beach Dazzle Shani dolls, which featured the dolls wearing Bikinis with golden accents. They would soon be followed by another beach themed wave titled Beach Streak Shani, which included Jamal this time (with a clean shaven face), copper streaks in their hair, and a new waist joint to reduce the gap in the doll's hips.

In 1993, in collaboration with the hit TV series Soul Train, a fourth wave of Shani dolls based on the series was released, with the dolls wearing fashion inspired by African American textiles and dance fashion. Accessories included the traditional hair pick, shoes, and stick-on jewels for the dolls. This line would end up being the last wave of Shani dolls before the series was discontinued. While there has never been an official reason given for why the series abruptly ended, it has been theorized that it was because of poor sales.

== Legacy ==
Despite the end of the Shani doll line, Shani would continue to have a presence in the Barbie franchise. In 1994, Shani would officially cross over into the Barbie franchise as her friend, debuting in the Sun Jewel Barbie line as Sun Jewel Shani, wearing an orange colored bikini. Shani would also make an appearance in the Jewel & Glitter Barbie line as Jewel & Glitter Shani. The doll's face sculpts would also continue to be used on African American versions of Barbie dolls, and for Barbie's black friends. The sculpts were also notably used for some celebrity dolls, including the 2005 Destiny’s Child Barbie doll line, with Kelly Rowland and Michelle Williams getting the Asha and Shani face, respectively. Interestingly enough, only the Beyoncé doll got her own face mold sculpted to her likeness. Asha's face sculpt is also notable for unofficially becoming the new face for Barbie's black friend Christie, as the face sculpt got used most frequently for Christie and African American versions of Barbie. Jamal's face sculpt also unofficially became the standard face for Steven, Christie's boyfriend, and for African American versions of Ken. Shani's face is the rarest of the 4 sculpts, which includes the Jamal sculpt.

Beyond the sculpts, even the body mold became used for Barbie brand dolls ever since, being a particular staple of collector brand Barbie dolls due to the slender and shapely frame and arms, before it was replaced by the Model Muse body as the standard body for collector dolls. It was dubbed the Shani body. The Shani body was commonly used on Bob Mackie designer Barbies, and for Silkstone dolls in the Barbie Fashion Model Collection.

=== Asha - African American Collection ===
After the line's cancellation, Mattel made yet another attempt to release an ethnically correct doll line featuring black dolls. The line of dolls was known as Asha - African American Collection (or simply Asha), which the back of the box stated that the name meant life in Swahili. Confusingly, though the dolls happened to share a name with one of Shani's friends Asha, the dolls had nothing to do with each other and weren't the same character, made more apparent by the fact that Asha dolls used the Shani face sculpt. The series contained only three dolls, all of them featuring fashion inspired by African textiles and had gold accents in their clothes, in reference to the importance of gold in African culture. After only three dolls, all of them released as part of a single wave, the Asha doll line was also discontinued.

=== Byron Lars - The Runway Collection ===
Byron Lars is an American fashion designer who was recruited by Mattel to design high-end collector Barbie dolls that were Afrocentric to introduce more diversity in the collector line. His first Barbie doll was In the Limelight, released in 1997, and it used the Nichelle face sculpt. The doll would be followed by Cinnabar Sensation Barbie 1998 who used the Asha face, and Plum Royale Barbie 1999 who used the Shani face. Lars was a fan of the Shani line before its cancellation, and sought to reintroduce the dolls via his series known as The Runway Collection. These dolls are credited for re-introducing the face sculpts and making them popular again amongst fans.

=== S.I.S/So in Style Dolls ===
In 2009, Mattel launched the So in Style doll line, said to be a spiritual successor to the Shani line from decades prior, as the line had a similar goal, of featuring exclusively black characters with ethnically correct facial features and fashion. Stacey McBride-Irby, designer of So in Style, was directly inspired by the Shani line for the new Afrocentric doll line. Just like with Shani, So in Style (also abbreviated as S.I.S) debuted completely independently from the Barbie line with its own characters. The line debuted with 4 main characters, Grace, Kara, Trichelle, and Chandra, all with their own unique face sculpt and skin-tone. When this line was also eventually discontinued, So in Style was retconned into the Barbie line as Barbie's friends, becoming a part of the Barbie line canonically.

== Appearances in media ==
Due to the success of the live-action Barbie (2023) film by Greta Gerwig, Mattel announced on September 30, 2025 that they have teamed up with Amazon MGM Studios to create a live-action television series based on the Shani doll line. The series will be helmed by show runner Janine Nabers while Jennifer Breslow, head of television for Mattel studios, will oversee the project.

== See also ==
- List of Barbie's friends and family
