= List of Barbie's friends and family =

Friends and family of Barbie

Barbie
- Barbie official logo
- Type: Fashion dolls; Media franchise
- Company: Mattel
- Country: United States
- Availability: 1959–present
- Slogan: "You Can Be Anything"
- Official website

This article shows the complete fictional and non-fictional friends and family of Barbie, a fashion doll manufactured by American toy and entertainment company Mattel and launched on March 9, 1959.

== Main characters ==
- Barbara Millicent "Barbie" Roberts (1959–present): A blonde-haired and blue-eyed doll who was born in the fictional town of Willows, Wisconsin. She's a doll that has had every possible profession, from astronaut to F1 (Formula 1) driver. She currently lives in Malibu and is an important figure there. According to eponymous Random House books published in the 1960s, the character's full name is Barbara Millicent Roberts. Barbie's age has fluctuated. She was originally a 19-year-old, but she is often shown as an older character in adult careers. The inaugural episode of Life in the Dreamhouse even jokes that she is over 40 years old. Barbie has three younger sisters: Skipper, Stacie and Chelsea. Mattel describes Barbie as strong, confident and always willing to help her siblings. In the live-action film version, She was portrayed by Australian actress Margot Robbie along versions played by diverse actresses.
- Kenneth Sean "Ken" Carson (1961–1967, 1969–present): Barbie's male counterpart and boyfriend as well as the second character added to the line. Mattel announced a split between him and Barbie in 2004 and a reunion on Valentine's Day in 2011. According to books published by Random House in the 1960s, Ken's full name is Kenneth Sean Carson. Since Barbie Dolphin Magic, he is one of Barbie's best friends and next-door neighbor, although pre-2017 romantic aesthetic began to resurface between the two in the 2023 television series Barbie: A Touch of Magic.

== Family members ==
=== Barbie's sisters ===
Barbie has three younger sisters: Skipper, Stacie and Chelsea, who made their collective debuts in the 2011 Christmas film Barbie: A Perfect Christmas. Chelsea, previously known as Kelly, had a lead role in the 2002 syndicated television series, Kelly’s Dream Club, in which Barbie appeared in a supporting role. Since then, they appeared as main characters in media adaptations of the franchise, including Barbie: Life in the Dreamhouse and the Barbie & Her Sisters in... film entries in the film series. Since Barbie Dreamhouse Adventures in 2018, they have become permanent main characters in the overall Barbie franchise makeup.

- Skipper Roberts (1964–2003, 2009–present): The teenage younger sister of Barbie and the first character added to Barbie's family. Originally released as an 8-year-old, she was changed to a 14-year-old later on. Mattel temporarily halted production of Skipper dolls between 2003 and 2009. When Skipper returned in 2009, she was redesigned to have brown hair with a purple (or sometimes blue) colored streak. Since the debut of Life in the Dreamhouse in 2012, Skipper has shown interest in technology, music and gadgets. Skipper had a lead role in the 2023 television film, Barbie: Skipper and the Big Babysitting Adventure.
- Stacie Roberts (1990–present): Introduced as Kelly in the 1990 Wedding Day Midge gift set as the flower girl, this doll was renamed and re-introduced as Stacie shortly thereafter in 1992, and the Kelly name was instead used for her younger sister. Since her appearance in Life in the Dreamhouse, Stacie is 11 years old and shown to be a competitive, skilled athlete. She has her own line of sports-themed dolls called "Team Stacie". Stacie has her lead role in the 2024 television film Barbie and Stacie to the Rescue.
- Shelly/Kelly/Chelsea Roberts (1995–2010 as Shelly/Kelly, 2011–present as Chelsea): Barbie's youngest sister, approximately 6 years old, then later 7 years old. Since her name changed to Chelsea, she loves the color pink and has blonde hair and blue eyes like her older sister Barbie. Also, she is shown to be mutely arrogant in showing cleverness and brilliance at solving certain mysteries. She always tries to be creative and passionate. Chelsea is the star of her show format, Barbie Dreamtopia and the 2021 television film Barbie & Chelsea: The Lost Birthday.

=== Barbie's parents ===
- George Roberts (1960–present): George is the father of Barbie, Skipper, Stacie, and Chelsea. Originally just a book character, he had never been issued in doll form until 2018 with his debut animated appearance in Barbie Dreamhouse Adventures. Originally an engineer in the 1960s Barbie book series, his occupation was retooled as a documentary filmmaker beginning with Dreamhouse Adventures.
- Margaret Rawlins Roberts (1960–present): Margaret is the mother of Barbie, Skipper, Stacie, and Chelsea. Like George and also originally a book character, she had never been issued in doll form until 2018 with her debut appearance in Dreamhouse Adventures. Initially a homemaker, her occupation was retooled as a computer engineer, and the designer of the Roberts family dreamhouse since Dreamhouse Adventures. She has a sister named Millicent.

=== Discontinued characters ===
- Tutti and Todd (Tutti: 1966–1971, Todd: 1966–1971; 1991–2008): Twins, both Tutti and Todd were younger siblings of Barbie and Skipper and had seamless 'bendy' bodies with internal wires. The two were only sold together in one set. They debuted in 1966 and were available in the US until 1971, remaining on the European market until 1980. Todd was reintroduced in 1991 as part of the wedding party for Barbie's best friend Midge Hadley, but Tutti was not reintroduced, with new sisters Kelly/later Chelsea and Stacie taking her place. Mattel produced several more of the new Todd dolls over the next few years, but Todd was dropped from the Barbie line after 2008. The last version of Todd was the 2008 Todd and Stacie Mary Poppins boxed set, with a comment on the back that "Todd and Stacie are dressed as Michael and Jane from Disney's Mary Poppins".
- Francie Fairchild (1966–1977): Marketed as "Barbie's Modern Cousin," Francie paved the way for Barbie's transition into the MOD era. Francie appeared to be only slightly younger than Barbie, and had a straight and streamlined figure. The Francie doll was the first to feature rooted eyelashes. In the March 1966 issue of Barbie Magazine, she is the daughter of Claude and Lily Fairchild.
- Jazzie (1988–1992): Another cousin of Barbie and part of a small group of high school age dolls. She was taller than Francie, with Jazzie being almost the same height as Barbie.
- Kristine "Krissy" Roberts (1998–2001): This character is an infant and is only intermittently included in the Barbie sibling lineup.
- Blaine Gordon (2004): Barbie's Australian ex-boyfriend, whom she dated during her much-publicized "breakup" with Ken. Blaine is said to be the brother of Summer, one of Barbie's friends. Blaine does not show up in any of the Barbie series but was originally a character from Generation Girls and showed interest in Ana.

== Extended family members ==
- Kristen (2013): A cousin of Barbie, appearing in the picture book, The Wedding Party where she marries Michael. It is never stated which side of the family she is on. She was never made into a doll.

=== Roberts Family ===
- Marlene Roberts (2015): Barbie's aunt, George's sister and Margaret's sister-in-law. She was never made into a doll.
- Max Roberts (2013): The son of Marlene Roberts, twin brother of Marie, cousin of Barbie and her sisters, and nephew of Margaret Roberts and George Roberts. He showed up in Barbie & Her Sisters in A Pony Tale.
- Marie Roberts (2013): The daughter of Marlene Roberts, twin sister of Max, cousin of Barbie and her sisters, and niece of Margaret Roberts and George Roberts. She showed up in Barbie & Her Sisters in A Pony Tale. Marie is shown to be an otaku.
- Lillian "Lily" Roberts Fairchild (1966): Francie's mother, Barbie's aunt, George's sister and Margaret's sister-in-law. She was never made into a doll.
- Claude Fairchild (1966): Francie's father, Barbie's uncle, and Margaret and George's brother-in-law. He was never made into a doll.

=== Rawlins Family ===
- Grandmother Rawlins (2015): Barbie's grandmother and Margaret Roberts' mother. She passed her love of reading onto Barbie and gave her a book that Barbie related to. She is encouraging and supportive of her granddaughter. She was first mentioned in the story "Barbie's Big Prom" in the 1962 Random House Novel Here's Barbie where she is implied to be living in New Orleans. Her first movie appearance is in Barbie and the Secret Door as Alexa's (Barbie) grandmother. She also appears in Barbie & Her Sisters in The Great Puppy Adventure as herself. She is living in Willows, WI. She was never made into a doll.
- Adele (2019–present): Barbie's aunt and the owner of the Windy Willows Inn in Barbie's hometown, Willows, Wisconsin. She first appeared in season 3, episode 3 of Barbie Dreamhouse Adventures, "The Ballad of Windy Willows." Her most recent appearance was in season 5, episode 7, "The Curse of the Miner's Ghost." Her design is very similar to Margaret's, suggesting they are sisters. She was never made into a doll.
- Millicent Rawlins (2010): Barbie's aunt and Margaret's sister. Although never made into a doll, she first appeared media-wise as a fashion designer with an atelier in Paris in the 2010 film Barbie: A Fashion Fairytale. She also appeared towards the conclusion of the 2011 film, Barbie: A Perfect Christmas where she joined with Barbie and her sisters in celebrating the holiday. She has yet to appear in any form since 2012.
- Lulu Belle Rawlins (1962): Barbie's cousin who lives in New Orleans. She visits the Roberts family in the story "Barbie's Big Prom" in the 1962 Random House Novel Here's Barbie She was never made into a doll.
- Mr. & Mrs. Rawlins (1962): Lulu's parents who live in New Orleans. They are mentioned in the story "Barbie's Big Prom" in the 1962 Random House Novel Here's Barbie They were never made into dolls.

== Barbie's friends ==
=== Female best friends ===
- Margaret "Midge" Hadley Sherwood (1963–1966, 1988–2004, 2013–2015): This character was Barbie's Irish-American best friend. She was the third character introduced to the Barbie line, following Barbie and Ken. In the Random House novels, her last name is Hadley. She was paired with Allan Sherwood, Ken's best friend, when Allan was introduced in 1964. After she married Allan/Alan in 1991, she became Midge Hadley Sherwood. In the 1990s Price Stern Sloan series Adventures with Barbie, she and Alan are married, and in book 5, "The Phantom of Shrinking Pond" by Suzanne Weyn (1992), it is implied that she is named after her Aunt Margaret. She is named Viky in Brazil (from the book Barbie Doll Around the World by J. Michael Augustyniak (2008, Collector Books)). In 2001 she was given her line named Happy Family. Midge was released with a magnetic belly and a baby. Also in the line was Alan and their son Ryan, and Midge's parents though they were not given real names. In 2013, she was brought back in the Barbie: Life in the Dreamhouse web series where she undergoes a makeover to look more modern, though the character tends to act like she is still in the 1960s. There is no mention of Allan/Alan in the series. In 2024, Midge was brought back again in the Deluxe Style.
- Christie (1968–2005, 2015): Barbie doll's first African-American friend character, Christie was part of the new group of Talking dolls for 1968. She was later issued as a Twist 'N Turn version. The character appeared in the product line continuously for many years, though the original Christie face sculpt was discontinued in 1978. She is notable in that she has been romantically linked with several male characters over the years. In 1970, she was linked with Brad, the Talking Brad doll even said, "Christie is the greatest". In 1982, the Sunsational Malibu Christie doll had a boyfriend named Ken who used the Brad face sculpt with rooted hair. In the late 1980s, Christie was paired with Steven. The surname O'Neil is associated with the Nikki character, who is purported to be Christie's sister, but the surname has not been associated directly with Christie. The doll has been criticized as following American beauty standards instead of representing Afrocentric body image, representing only one tone of skin color, and because her sculpted features were seen to symbolize white standards of beauty. Christie was discontinued when Barbie got Nikki as her new African-American friend, though Nikki uses Christie's face, the change in name of almost the same doll was never stated. In the 2015 movie Barbie & her Sisters in the Great Puppy Adventure, Christie is the name of one of Barbie's old friends from Willows, Wisconsin. On the back of the 1998 Beyond Pink Christie box, her birthday is August 9. In 2025, Christie was brought back again in the Deluxe Style wave 2.
- Teresa Rivera (1988–present): Originally used the 1983 Spanish Barbie face sculpt for the Island Fun Teresa doll and the Beach Blast Teresa doll. Starting with the Wet 'N Wild Teresa doll, the character began using the 1972 Steffie face sculpt. Starting with the Rollerblade Teresa doll, the character began using an all-new face sculpt that has become known as the Teresa face sculpt. In the Grolier book "High Sea Adventure" (1999), her last name is Rivera. Teresa is of Latina heritage. She is named Debora in Brazil (from the book Barbie Doll Around the World, by J. Michael Augustyniak, (2008, Collector Books)). She was featured in the 2008 film Barbie & the Diamond Castle as Barbie's best friend, where she told a story about her and Barbie (as Liana and Alexa) as two girls closer than most friends living in the forest. She appeared in the web series Barbie: Life in the Dreamhouse and now stars in Barbie Dreamhouse Adventures as one of Barbie's best friends. She also starred in the 2016 movie, Barbie: Spy Squad alongside Barbie and Renee. On the back of the 1999 Beyond Pink Teresa box, her birthday is October 2.
- Summer Gordon (2004–2015): This doll used an all-new face sculpt. Summer is Blaine's younger sister with strawberry blonde hair and green/brown eyes. She was a frequent character in the web series Barbie: Life in the Dreamhouse. She was from Australia when she was introduced in 2004, but in all of animated media, she is American.
- Nicole "Nikki" Watkins (2006–present): This doll appears as one of Barbie's current friends, and is closer to her, Barbie is often seen hanging out with just Teresa and Nikki. She has used other different head sculpts through the years. Her last name is O'Neil in the 2010 Random House book, "Barbie: I Can be a Movie Star," but her last name was established as Watkins in Barbie Dreamhouse Adventures. She was a frequent character in the web series Barbie: Life in the Dreamhouse and now stars in Barbie Dreamhouse Adventures as one of Barbie's best friends.
- Raquelle (2006–2015): This doll used the Summer face sculpt with her debut. In 2011 she appeared with an all-new face sculpt in the Barbie Fashionistas line. She is Barbie's frenemy as shown in The Barbie Diaries, Barbie: A Fashion Fairytale, Barbie: A Fairy Secret and the web series Barbie: Life in the Dreamhouse, and has a twin brother named Ryan. In 2026, Raquelle was brought back in the Deluxe Style wave 3.
- Grace (2009–2015): This African-American doll made its first appearance in the 2009 SIS Line, she used to be a friend of Barbie who moves to Chicago and makes new friends. She also appears in Barbie: A Fashion Fairytale. In 2014, she moved back to Malibu. Her backstory was revived when she started appearing in Barbie: Life in the Dreamhouse. She is very smart and interested in science.

=== Other friends ===
Left: Walk Lively Steffie, from 1972. Right: Free Moving PJ, from 1974. The Steffie face sculpt was used for decades, for many different Barbie-related Mattel dolls. Her eye color, hairstyle and hair color changed as well.

- Stacey (1968–1971): Introduced as "Barbie's British chum" during the musical British Invasion of the US, Stacey first appeared in 1968 as a pull-string 'Talking' doll with long hair, either blonde or redhead, tied in a side ponytail, as well as a 'TnT' (Twist 'n Turn) Stacey with long hair, again either blonde or redhead, tied in a ponytail with three spitcurls framing her face. A later edition TnT Stacey had much shorter hair, styled in a curly flip, again as either a blonde or redhead. It is the Stacey face sculpt that is used for Malibu Barbie.
- PJ (1969–1983): Fully representing the "groovy", "hippie" era of the late 1960s, PJ originally appeared using Midge's face sculpt, but with much longer hair, tied into beaded pigtails. In 1972, with PJ's addition to the Malibu Barbie line (consisting of Barbie, Ken, Skipper, and Francie), she changed to the Steffie face sculpt, which continued until the end of her production. She was billed as Barbie's best friend, again replacing Midge. One of the last iterations of the doll, "Dream Date PJ", erroneously lists her as Barbie's cousin. It is the only such reference and should not be considered canon.
- Steffie (1972): Although only three versions of Steffie were produced (Busy Steffie, Talking Busy Steffe and Walk Lively Steffie), all of which appeared in 1972, her face sculpt was used for several Barbie-family dolls for many years after, primarily the PJ doll. Some Barbies of that era, issued outside the US, use the Steffie face sculpt. In at least one Mattel advertisement from 1972, Busy Steffie is pictured, but is referred to as "Busy PJ", indicating that, even though Barbie fans refer to her as having the Steffie face sculpt, it is actually Steffie that has the PJ face sculpt. However, because PJ had used the Midge face sculpt for three years prior, Steffie was the first Mattel doll to use it as her only face sculpt, hence the name "Steffie face".
- Cara (1975–1976): Appears in Mattel's Barbie line with her boyfriend Curtis, alongside Barbie's other African-American couple, Brad and Christie. Cara was produced as Free Moving Cara, Ballerina Cara, and both Quick Curl and Deluxe Quick Curl Cara. She was produced with the Steffie face (Christie continues to appear as well, in the Malibu, Fashion Photo and Superstar lines from Mattel).
- Whitney (1986–1991): Described on her introduction as “Barbie doll’s glamorous best friend” in the Jewel Secrets Barbie line of 1986 (Princess Laura in Europe). This doll uses the Steffie face and always featured brunette hair. Returned in 1987 as Nurse Whitney in the Doctor Barbie line, and Perfume Pretty Whitney the same year. Made a comeback for 1988 in the Style Magic Barbie line. She made her last appearance as European exclusive Ultra Hair Whitney.
- Kira/Miko (Marina in Europe) (1985–2001): Barbie doll's first Asian friend character, the first appearance was in the line of Tropical Barbie in 1985 as Miko, a native Hawaiian. Kira, an Asian-American, was later introduced looking similar to Miko and with the same head sculpt. The character appeared in the product line continuously for many years, the original Kira/Oriental face sculpt was created in 1980. She's voiced by Grey DeLisle in Barbie Beach Vacation and Barbie Team Gymnastics.
- Becky (1997–1999): A friend of Barbie who uses a wheelchair. She used the Teen Skipper head mold but there were only three dolls ever made. She only appeared in Detective Barbie series and Secret Agent Barbie and voiced by Kath Soucie.
- Kayla and Lea (2000–2006): First appearing as Dress Up Kayla, she appears in other formats for the next four years and was released in tandem with Lea. Lea was an Asian girl and Kayla was depicted as almost every race, not being consistent. Kayla eventually was removed, and Lea existed until 2006, leaving Mattel's Barbie line with no Asian dolls until Lea's re-introduction in 2014.
- Jamie (1970-1972): Barbie's redheaded walking friend.
- Kelley (1973–1974): Quick Curl and Yellowstone. Not to be confused with the other dolls named Kelly.
- Nikki (1988): An Asian girl appearing only in the Animal Lovin' line.
- Devon (1989): A black girl appearing in Dance Club.
- Kayla (1989): A redheaded Dutch American girl appearing in Dance Club.
- Tracy (1983): A brunette friend sold in a wedding gown.
- Nia (1989): A Native American girl appearing in the Western Fun line.
- Tara Lynn (1994): A dark-haired girl appearing in the Western Stampin' (Country in Brazil) line. In Brazil, she was called Tina.
- Reina (1999): Barbie's Japanese friend. She was a Japan exclusive and used the Steffie face sculpt. Only one version was ever released. She was dressed in a schoolgirl outfit.
- Drew (2002–2005): Appearing in the Mystery Squad and Fashion Fever lines.
- Melody and Simone (2003): Appearing in 1 Modern Circle. Melody had blue hair and Simone was an African-American.
  - Simone would reappear in the American Idol line with Barbie and Tori in 2005, with the Summer face sculpt.
- Shannen (2005): Blonde-haired Fashion Fever doll.
- Maiko (2006): An East Asian geisha released as a Collector doll.
- Harper Villa (2016–2018): First 'curvy' friend of Barbie, with blue hair. Appears in Fashionistas line and in vlogs.
- Renee Chao (2016–present): Renee is a character in the 2016 film Barbie: Spy Squad and Dreamhouse Adventures. She is a gymnast and athletic in both yoga and skateboarding. She is Chinese-American.
- Daisy Costopolis (2018–present): from Dreamhouse Adventures, a curvy friend of Barbie with pink hair.
- Tia, Courtney, and Desiree (2004): Fashion Fever dolls. Tia and Courtney look quite similar to the characters of Tia and Courtney from the movie The Barbie Diaries but are separate characters.

Several friends were exclusive to certain countries:

- Lia (1980s): Mainline Brazil exclusive, appears in one of the Rockers lines (Brazil had different Rockers editions), and replaces Whitney in their edition of the Perfume Pretty line. She usually had light brown hair, but sometimes was blonde.
- Dalma "Diva" Lancaster (1980s): Mainline Brazil exclusive, a blonde-haired girl who shares the same nickname as Ophelia from the Rockers line.
- Viky (1989): A Brazilian friend of Barbie, released exclusively in Brazil. She used the Steffie face sculpt. Usually a redhead, but sometimes a brunette, and a blonde in one Rockers line.
- Lara (1992): Brunette Brazil exclusive, she only appears in their edition of the Lights N Lace line, called Superstar. Christie and Teresa were replaced by her and Kira (the only time Kira, or any Asian doll for that matter, was released in Brazil).
- May Chung Ling (2008–2009): Barbie's East Asian friend from Shanghai, released exclusively in the Barbie Shanghai boutique. According to her passport, she has many accessories, her favorite food is ice cream. She enjoys singing and dancing. Only two versions would be released, until the boutique closed.

=== The Rockers and the Sensations ===
- Dee Dee: Later known as "Belinda" in the United States, as she did not exist in the European Sensations line. She is African-American. Never released in Latin America.
- Dana: Later known as "Becky" or "Bibi" in Europe. Never released in Latin America. She is Asian-American.
- Diva: Later known as "Bopsy" or "Becky" in Europe. Released in Brazil only once, albeit in a different outfit and with darker hair (Venezuela had three outfits for her).
- Derek: The only male member of the band.

=== Generation Girls ===
- Tori/Susie/Vicky Burns: Barbie's friend from Sydney, Australia who enjoyed extreme sports.
  - Tori would reappear in the American Idol line with Barbie and Simone in 2005, but with the Summer face sculpt.
- Nichelle Williams Watson: Barbie's friend from New York City, USA who enjoyed modeling.
- Ana/Marissa Suarez: Barbie's friend from Mexico City, Mexico who enjoyed swimming and track and field.
- Chelsie/Gabby Peterson: Barbie's friend from London, Europe who enjoyed songwriting.
- Lara/Marie Morelli-Strauss: Barbie's friend from Paris, Europe who enjoyed fine arts.
- Mari/Mariko Nakano: Barbie's friend from Tokyo, Japan who enjoyed video games.
- Blaine Gordon: Barbie's friend from New York City, USA who enjoyed spinning.

=== Miscellaneous ===
- Barbie Loves Benetton (2004–2005): A group of diverse girls from around the world, named after the Benetton design company.
- Isla Filipina (2000s): A spin-off similar to Shani's but aimed at Filipino young people.

== Friends of family ==
=== Skipper's friends ===
- Skooter (1965–1968, 1975–1976): Skipper's first female friend.
- Ricky (1965–1967): Skipper's first male friend (sometimes referred to as Skipper's first "boyfriend").
- Fluff (1971–1972): Skipper's playmate.
- Tiff (1972–1973): Skipper's tomboy friend.
- Ginger (1975): Friend of "Growing Up Skipper".
- Scott (1980): Skipper's boyfriend.
- Courtney (1989–2018): Skipper's best friend.
- Kevin (1990–1995): Skipper's cool teen boyfriend.
- Nikki (1997–2001): Skipper's first black friend. Nikki is Christie's little sister.

=== Stacie's friends ===
- Janet (1994–2006): An African American character doll In the Grolier Barbie book "Clawman's Warning", by Jacqueline A. Ball, (1999). Janet's mother is named Carolyn.
- Whitney (1994–2006): Stacie's other doll friend, usually having red hair but has been seen with brown. She was usually released with a pair of glasses.
- Lila Hadley (2004–2008): Midge Hadley Sherwood's little sister, Lila, Janet, and Stacie were a part of the Wee 3 Friends line. She had red hair.

=== Kelly's/Chelsea's friends ===
- Tommy (1997): Ken's little brother.
- Melody Hadley (1996): Also used for a Heart Family cousin in 1988; named Susie in Europe; Midge's sister.
- Lorena (1996)
- Jenny (1996)
- Chelsie (1995)
- Keeya (1998)
- Marisa (1998)
- Deidre (1998): Christie's sister
- Dallin (1998)
- Camdyn (1999)
- Maria (1999)
- Tamika (1999)
- Nia (1999): Used for a friend of Barbie's in 1990.
- Kayla (1999, 2007): Also used for an adult character in the 1990s and 2000s.
- Liana (1999)
- Desiree (1999)
- Belinda (1999): Also used for a friend of Barbie's in 1988.
- Nikki (2001): Also used for a friend of Skipper's in 1997 and currently a friend of Barbie.
- Ryan (2001): Became part of the Happy Family Show in 2010; also used for Raquelle's brother and Barbie's friend in 2013 for "Barbie: Life in the Dreamhouse".
- Kerstie (2003)
- Gia (2006)
- Tori (2007): Also used for a friend of Barbie's in 1999.
- Miranda (2007)
- Whitney: Also used for a friend of Barbie's in the 1980s and for a friend of Stacie.
- Becky: Also used for a friend of Barbie's in 1997 and for a friend of Francie's in 2009.
- Lola: Nikki's little sister
- Johnny: One of Chelsea's Hawaiian friends.
- Darrin: One of Chelsea's soccer friends

=== Tutti's and Todd's friends ===
- Chris (1967–68, 1976–77): A female character doll, with a different face sculpt from Tutti and Todd.
- Carla (European release only, 1976): An African American character doll.

=== Francie's friends ===
- Casey (1967–70, 1975): Billed as Francie's Fun Friend, she is the same measurements as Francie, and is thus able to wear her wardrobe. She has blue eyes, and is found in blonde, brunette and redhead styles (the redhead being a result of the brunette hair oxidizing, as happens with some Christie and Julia dolls and some earlier releases of the 1967 brunette Twist 'n Turn Barbie). Her original blonde hair is a true blonde, cut into a chin-length bob. Later editions feature a platinum blonde Casey with a coarser hair texture. Casey's hair is frequently asymmetrical, as was in vogue at the time. These dolls' hair is longer, sometimes near shoulder length. All editions come without shoes, with Casey in a one-piece swimsuit: the top is white with gold mesh; the bottoms are shiny gold (though frequently fade to a matte silver color). She comes with only one ear pierced, in which is placed one gold-tone dangle triangle earring, which turns Casey's ear green if left in for a number of years. Dolls found by collectors today frequently present with some or extensive 'green ear'. The sooner the earring was removed, the better the chance this situation is avoided entirely.
  •In 1971, Mattel launched its iconic Malibu line of dolls. Even though Francie is featured prominently, it is with Casey's head mould and blue eyes (Francie is brown-eyed).
  •In 1975, Mattel produced a budget Francie and Casey, contained in clear plastic bags with hang tags, referred to by collectors as 'baggie Francie' and 'baggie Casey'. Interestingly, both Francie and Casey share Francie's head mold. For these pink skin-toned, straight leg and straight waist dolls, Francie is a brunette with brown eyes and a yellow bikini, while Casey is blonde with brown eyes (because she is using Francie's face), in a bikini which is found in varying shades of red, rose, and hot pink.
- Becky (2009): In 1971, as Casey ended production, Mattel intended to introduce a Francie-sized doll to replace her. This doll was named Becky. She appears (apparently, a prototype) in Mattel's 1971 fashion booklets that came with Mattel's Barbie doll fashions, alongside her friend Francie. She is presented using the Casey face mold, but with brown eyes and an ash blonde flip with a headband. Some of Francie's fashions that year even list "Francie and Becky" on the boxes. However, for undetermined reasons, Becky never entered production. In 2009, Mattel finally produced a version of this near-mythical doll, in a boxed set titled Most Mod Becky. She was produced as she appeared in Mattel's 1971 fashion booklets, with three different outfits, and party accessories (such as invitations, records, record player, and telephone).

=== Jazzie's friends ===
- Dude (boyfriend – 1989): This doll was made from the 1986 Barbie and the Rockers Derek face sculpt.
- Chelsie (1989): This doll was made from the 1979 Starr friend Tracey face sculpt.
- Stacie (1989): This doll was made from the 1972 Steffie face sculpt and was African American character.

== Friends of friends ==
=== Ken's family and friends ===
- Allan (1964–1965, 1991, 2002): This character has been revived several times. Allan started out as "Ken's Buddy" and was paired with the Midge doll from the beginning. In 1991, a line of dolls was created depicting a wedding for Allan and Midge. Later, a family-themed line of dolls, much like the earlier Heart Family, had the two characters raising a family.
- Brad (1970): This African American male doll was available in two versions: Talking Brad and Brad with Bendable Legs. He was made from an all-new face sculpt that is known as the Brad face sculpt. The Brad character was introduced as a boyfriend for the Christie character.
- Curtis (1975): This African American male character is virtually identical to Brad, and was available as only one version, 1975 Free Moving Curtis. Curtis was the boyfriend of the Free Moving Cara doll.
- Todd (1983): This doll was only available as a groom character, paired with the Tracy character from the same year. This Todd doll used the 1978 Super Star Ken face sculpt.
- Steven (boyfriend of Christie, 1988–present. Linked with Barbie's friend Nikki since 2007): This doll has been in the lineup intermittently over the years and has used several different face sculpts during that time.
- Tommy (1997): Ken's little brother.
- Derek (1985): He was never advertised as a friend of Ken's but was a member of Barbie and the Rockers along with Ken and the four female band members listed above.
- Kurt (2005): He was a Fashion Fever friend of Barbie. He was the first male doll in this line and was made with the Tango Ken/Blaine face sculpt.
- Ryan (2012–2015): He is Raquelle's twin brother and Ken's rival. He is a main character in the Barbie: Life in the Dreamhouse series. Ryan has a crush on Barbie, and therefore competes with Ken for her affection.

=== Midge and Allan's family ===
From Happy Family Playline Series:

- Midge Hadley
- Alan Sherwood
- Ryan Sherwood (Midge and Alan's son, 2002)
- Nicole "Nikki" Sherwood (Midge and Alan's daughter, 2003)
- Cassandra Sherwood (Midge and Alan's daughter, 2004)
- Twins a girl and a boy.
- Grandma Hadley (Midge's mother, 2004)
- Grandpa Hadley (Midge's father, 2004)
- Unnamed Puppy (2004)

=== The Heart Family (Barbie's neighbors) ===
- Dad Heart (1985)
- Mom Heart (1985)
- Girl Heart(1985)
- Boy Heart (1985)
- New Baby Heart (1987)
- Grandma Heart (1987)
- Grandpa Heart (1987)

==== Cousins ====
- Honey (1988) sold with a high chair.
- Janet (1988) sold with a potty chair.
- Kenny (1988) sold with a tricycle.
- Kevin (1988) sold with a high chair.
- Melody (1988) sold with a walker.
- Nellie (1988) sold with a rocking horse.

==== Friends ====
- Daria (1989) sold with a desk.
- Darrin (1989) sold with a desk.
- Gillian (1989) sold with a giraffe.
- Nikita (1993) sold only in India.
- Pleasance (1989) sold with a pony (rocking horse).
- Sunny (1993) sold only in India.
- Susan (1993) sold only in India.
- Tawny (1989) sold with a tricycle.
- Windy (1989) sold with a wagon.

== Real-world celebrity/film character doll friends ==
- Twiggy (1967) Based on the top teen fashion model Lesley Hornby Lawson of the Mod era, the Twiggy doll was made using the same face sculpt as Francie doll's friend Casey.
- Buffy & Mrs. Beasley (1968) Based on Anissa Jones' character from the TV show Family Affair, the Tutti-sized doll carried a miniature Mrs. Beasley doll.
- Julia (1969–1970) The doll was based on Diahann Carroll's character from the TV show Julia and used the same face sculpt as the Christie doll, with different face paint and a different hairstyle.
- Truly Scrumptious (1969) This doll, based on Sally Anne Howes' character from the movie Chitty Chitty Bang Bang, was made from the Francie face sculpt, but used the Barbie body. There was a Talking Truly Scrumptious doll, as well as a basic version known as Standard Truly Scrumptious to collectors.
- Miss America (1972–1977) This doll was introduced in 1972 as Walk Lively Miss America, and the following year was sold as Quick Curl Miss America. The Quick Curl Miss America doll was available with only slight variations for several years during the mid-1970s. She uses the Steffie/PJ face sculpt.
- Marie Osmond (1977) Featured an all-new likeness face sculpt.
- Donny Osmond (1977) Featured an all-new likeness face sculpt.
- Chantal Goya (1977) This doll is available only in Europe and featured a unique likeness face sculpt.
- Debby Boone (1977) Based on the popular singer, this doll featured a unique likeness face sculpt.
- Kate Jackson (1978) Featured an all-new likeness face sculpt.
- Cheryl Ladd (1978) Featured an all-new likeness face sculpt.
- Kitty O'Neil (1978) Featured an all-new likeness face sculpt.
- Buddy (1979) This doll was based on Kristy McNichol's Letitia Lawrence character from the TV show Family.
- Jimmy Osmond (1979) Featured an all-new likeness face sculpt.
- Wayne Gretzky (1983) the hockey player for the Edmonton Oilers, a doll sold only in Canada. He had his own clothing line, which fits Ken.
- Donna Martin, Dylan McKay, Kelly Taylor, Brandon & Brenda Walsh (1992) based on the Beverly Hills 90210 characters played by Tori Spelling, Luke Perry, Jennie Garth, Jason Priestley, and Shannen Doherty. They had their own lines of clothing, which fit Barbie and Ken.
- MC Hammer (1992) the rapper, Stanley Burrell. He had his own line of clothing, which fits Ken.
- Scarlett O'Hara and Rhett Butler (1994) based on the 1939 feature film, Gone with the Wind, played by Vivien Leigh and Clark Gable Hollywood Legends Collection.
- Dorothy Gale, Scarecrow, Tin Man, Cowardly Lion, Glinda the Good Witch (1995, 1999, 2006, 2009), Wicked Witch of the West (2006, 2009), Munchkins (1999, 2006), Winkie Guard, Winged Monkey (2006) and Wicked Witch of the East (2009), based on the 1939 feature film The Wizard of Oz; Hollywood Legends Collection; Pink Label Collection.
- Eliza Doolittle and Henry Higgins (1995) Based on the 1964 feature film My Fair Lady; played by Audrey Hepburn and Rex Harrison Hollywood Legends Collection.
- Maria (1995) Based on the 1965 film, The Sound of Music; played by Julie Andrews Hollywood Legends Collection.
- Johnny Hallyday (1995) French singer, sold only in France.
- Cher Horowitz, Amber Mariens and Dionne Davenport (1997) based on the Clueless characters played by Rachel Blanchard, Elisa Donovan and Stacey Dash.
- Marilyn Monroe (1997, 2001, 2009), Hollywood Legends Collection, Timeless Treasures Collection, and Blonde Ambition Collection.
- Elvis Presley (1997–2021) The first version came in a gift set called "Barbie Loves Elvis."
- Lucille Ball (1997–2021) The first version was as the Vitameatavegamin Girl.
- Audrey Hepburn (1998, 2013) Audrey Hepburn in Breakfast at Tiffany's; Audrey Hepburn in Breakfast at Tiffany's Pink Princess Fashion; Audrey Hepburn in Roman Holiday Doll; Audrey Hepburn as Sabrina Doll.
- Rosie O'Donnell (1999), as host of The Rosie O'Donnell Show. Her segment is "Rosie's Barbie Theater" with stop-motion with real fashion dolls.
- Mary-Kate and Ashley Olsen (1999–2005), fraternal twin actresses and fashion designers.
- Brandy Norwood (1999–2000) R&B Singer and actress.
- Frank Sinatra (1999–?) The first version came in a gift set called "Barbie Loves Frank Sinatra."
- Elizabeth Taylor (1999, 2012) The Elizabeth Taylor Collection.
- James Dean (2000), From the Timeless Treasures Collection.
- Cher (2001–?), From the Timeless Treasures Collection; Black Label Collection.
- Shakira (2002) Colombian singer.
- Destiny's Child (Beyoncé, Kelly Rowland, and Michelle Williams) (2005) international Superstars. Beyoncé famously got her own face sculpt while Kelly and Michelle got leftover face sculpts from Barbie's friends, Asha and Shani, respectively.
- Diana Ross (2005) American singer.
- Leann Rimes (2005) American country and pop singer.
- Martina McBride (2005) American country music singer and songwriter.
- Lindsay Lohan (2005) from My Scene Goes Hollywood, part of the My Scene line.
- Raven Baxter (2005) based on the That's So Raven character played by Raven-Symoné.
- Mía Colucci, Lupita Fernandez, Roberta Pardo, Miguel Arango, Diego Bustamante and Giovanni Méndez (2007, 2024), based on the Mexican soap opera Rebelde, played by members of RBD. The second collection was released to commemorate the group's revival from their 15-year hiatus and has a few differences from its original release: the exclusion of Arango due to his actor Alfonso Herrera's departure from the group, the exclusion of the Elite Way school uniform versions of Bustamante and Méndez, and the inclusion of the dolls in their stage outfits.
- Patrick Dempsey (2007) American actor and race car driver, Disney Movie Enchanted Robert.
- Amy Adams (2007) American actress, Disney Movie Enchanted Giselle.
- Kimora Lee Simmons (2008) former American fashion model; created fashion label Baby Phat.
- Goldie Hawn (2009) From the Black Label Blonde Ambition Collection.
- Heidi Klum (2009) From the Black Label Blonde Ambition Collection.
- Carol Burnett (2009) as seen on The Carol Burnett Show; Pink Label Collection.
- Debbie Harry (2009) From the "Ladies of the '80s" series.
- Joan Jett (2009) From the "Ladies of the '80s" series.
- Honey Ryder (2009) From the Black Label "Bond Girls" Collection. Sculpted in the Daria face sculpt.
- Pussy Galore (2010) From the Black Label "Bond Girls" Collection. Sculpted in the Mackie face sculpt.
- Jinx Johnson (2009) From the Black Label "Bond Girls" Collection. Sculpted in the likeness of Halle Berry.
- Octopussy (2010) From the Black Label "Bond Girls" Collection. Sculpted in the Daria face sculpt
- Solitaire (2010) From the Black Label "Bond Girls" Collection. Sculpted in the Lara face sculpt.
- Cyndi Lauper (2010) From the "Ladies of the '80s" series.
- Bella Swan, Edward Cullen, Jacob Black, Alice Cullen, Jane, Victoria, Carlisle Cullen, Esme Cullen, Jasper Hale, Rosalie Hale, and Emmett Cullen (2009–2011), based on The Twilight Saga film series; Pink Label Collection
- Barbra Streisand (2010) From the Pink Label Collection.
- Farrah Fawcett (2010) From the Black Label Collection.
- Taylor Swift (2010) American country pop singer.
- Rock Hudson and Doris Day (2011) from the 1959 feature film Pillow Talk; Pink Label Collection.
- Grace Kelly (2011) To Catch a Thief Grace Kelly Doll; Grace Kelly The Bride Doll; Grace Kelly The Romance Doll; Rear Window Grace Kelly Doll
- Faith Hill & Tim McGraw (2011) American country pop singers.
- Nicki Minaj (2011) an American rapper and singer.
- Katy Perry (2011) an American singer and actress.
- Katniss Everdeen (2012) A character from the movie based on the Hunger Games books by Suzanne Collins. The doll is a likeness of actress Jennifer Lawrence.
- Peeta Mellark (2012) A character from the movie based on the Hunger Games books by Suzanne Collins. The doll is a likeness of actor Josh Hutcherson.
- Effie Trinket (2012) A character from the movie based on the Hunger Games books by Suzanne Collins. The doll is a likeness of actress Elizabeth Banks.
- Finnick Odair (2012) A character from the movie based on the Hunger Games books by Suzanne Collins. The doll is a likeness of actor Sam Claflin.
- Jennifer Lopez (2013) From the Black Label Collection. Two versions were released, one dressed in her world tour jumpsuit, the other with her dress worn at the red carpet.
- Batman, Superman, and Wonder Woman, black label dolls released as a promotional tie-in with Batman v Superman: Dawn of Justice (2016). Each one is sculpted in the likeness of their respective actor, Ben Affleck, Henry Cavill, and Gal Gadot.
- Claudia Schiffer (2017, 2020, 2023) German supermodel. The second collaboration released two versions.
- Tomb Raider (2018) features a doll based on Lara Croft in the film, sculpted in the likeness of Alicia Vikander.
- A Wrinkle in Time (2018) dolls based on Mrs. Which, Mrs. Whatsit, and Mrs. Who. Each doll is sculpted in the likeness of Oprah Winfrey, Reese Witherspoon, and Mindy Kaling respectively.
- Owen Grady and Claire Dearing from Jurassic World: Fallen Kingdom (2018). The dolls are sculpted in the likeness of Chris Pratt and Bryce Dallas Howard respectively.
- The Nutcracker and the Four Realms (2018) features dolls based on Clara, the Sugar Plum Fairy, and the Ballerina Princess. Each doll is sculpted in the likeness of Mackenzie Foy, Keira Knightley, and Misty Copeland respectively.
- Frida Kahlo (2018) Mexican artist. As of September 2018, the doll is no longer available.
- Amelia Earhart (2018) American aviator and the first woman to fly solo across the Atlantic Ocean.
- Katherine Johnson (2018) American mathematician.
- CookieSwirlC (2019) YouTube content creator, referred to as a Roberts sister on Barbie's YouTube channel.
- Rosa Parks (2019) American seamstress and civil rights activist.
- Sally Ride (2019) The first, and youngest, American woman to fly into space.
- Ella Fitzgerald (2020) American jazz singer.
- Susan B. Anthony (2020) American civil rights activist.
- Jean-Michel Basquiat (2020) American artist, as part of the Signature Collection. Despite the real-life artist being a male, the doll is produced as a female.
- Billie Jean King (2020) American tennis player.
- Florence Nightingale (2020) English nurse.
- Black Widow (2020) Two dolls based on the titular character were released, one in the black suit and one in the white suit. Both are sculpted in the likeness of Scarlett Johansson.
- Maya Angelou (2021) American writer, author and activist.
- Eleanor Roosevelt (2021) Ex-First Lady of the United States and Human Rights Activist.
- Helen Keller (2021) American author and activist.
- Sarah Gilbert (2021) British vaccinologist.
- Ida B. Wells (2022) American civil rights activist.
- Guo Pei (2022) Chinese fashion designer.
- Camila Cabello, Ally Brooke, Dinah Jane Hansen, Lauren Jauregui, Normani Kordei (2014) American music group Fifth Harmony American partnered with Mattel for “With Barbie anything is possible” campaign and released accompanying anthem inspired by tagline. Dolls appeared in “Barbie Life in the Dreamhouse” episode titled ‘Sister’s Fun Day’.
- Vera Wang (2022) American fashion designer, as part of the Tribute Collection.
- Queen Elizabeth II (2022) Queen of England, as part of the Tribute Collection.
- Laverne Cox (2022) American actress and LGBT rights activist, as part of the Tribute Collection. This doll became historical for being the first doll in Barbie history to be transgender, as Cox is a trans woman in real life.
- Jane Goodall (2022) English anthropologist and animal rights activist.
- Madam C.J. Walker (2022) American entrepreneur and hairstylist, as part of the Inspiring Women series in the Signature Collection.
- Gloria Estefan (2022) Cuban-American singer and songwriter, as part of the Signature Collection.
- Tina Turner (2022) American-born Swiss Singer and Songwriter, as part of the Signature Collection.
- Bessie Coleman (2023) American civil aviator, as part of the Inspiring Women series in the Signature Collection.
- Anna May Wong (2023) American actress, as part of the Inspiring Women series in the Signature Collection.
- María Félix (2023) Mexican actress and singer, as part of the Tribute Collection.
- Celia Cruz (2023) Cuban-American opera singer, as part of the Inspiring Women series in the Signature Collection.
- Wilma Mankiller (2023) Cherokee Nation chief and activist, as part of the Tribute Collection.
- Stevie Nicks (2023) American singer-songwriter, as part of the Signature Collection.
- Mariah Carey (2023) American singer, as part of the Signature Collection.
- Kristi Yamaguchi (2024) American figure skater, as part of the Inspiring Women series in the Signature Collection.
- Isabel Allende (2024) Chilean-American novelist and writer, as part of the Inspiring Women series in the Signature Collection.
- Sue Bird (2024) American basketball player, as part of the Signature Collection.
- Anita Dongre (2024) Indian fashion designer, as part of the Signature Collection.
- Rita Moreno (2024) Puerto Rican singer, actress and dancer, as part of the Tribute Collection.
- Aaliyah (2025) American singer, as part of the Signature Collection. It was released on January 16, 2025, to honor the late singer's 46th birthday. The doll also features the outfit that the singer wore in the music video of One in a Million from the eponymous album.

== Others ==
- Barbara "Brooklyn Barbie" Millicent Roberts (2021–present): A black eponymously-named friend of Barbie, first introduced in the 2021 film Barbie: Big City, Big Dreams. In the film, Barbie crosses paths with her over a locker engraved in their name in a performing arts school in Brooklyn, New York City. They become fast friends and have been sharing spotlights and lead roles in most recent entries in the media franchise. Christopher Keenan, who served as co-executive producer and co-writer of the 2021 film described her as a "fearless, smart and loyal friend with an exuberant and infectious personality" as well as being "a confident and optimistic triple-threat singer, dancer and musician who dreams big and believes in the limitless possibilities of life".

=== Model of the Moment ===
A collector series of dolls designed by veteran Mattel designer Robert Best. The series featured three new characters including Daria, Marisa, and Nichelle. The dolls were notable for featuring a new body sculpt known as Model Muse, which is a body designed to stay in one static pose as a display figurine. The series was discontinued after only 5 dolls, but the dolls live on as their face and body sculpts are used for other Barbie dolls ever since. The Model Muse body in particular has become the new standard body for collector dolls in the Barbie line.

- Daria (2004–2005) was the Caucasian doll in this collection. Two versions of her were released, including Daria Celebutante and Daria Shopping Queen.
- Marisa (2004–2005) was the Hispanic doll in this collection. Two versions of her were released, including Pretty Young Thing Marisa and Beach Baby Marisa.
- Nichelle (2004) was the African-American doll in this collection, not to be confused with the Shani character Nichelle. Only one version was released, Nichelle Urban Hipster.

=== Shani and friends ===
When first introduced, the Shani line of dolls existed outside of the Barbie character continuity. After a couple of years, the Shani character was introduced into the Barbie line.

- Shani (1991–1994)
- Asha (1991–1994)
- Nichelle (1991–1994)
- Jamal (boyfriend – 1992–1994)

=== Asha – African American Collection ===
A short-lived Afrocentric doll line introduced in 1994, retroactively considered Barbie friend dolls. Although the dolls are unrelated to Shani's friend Asha, the dolls still used the Shani face mold and were meant to be a successor to the Shani line.

=== Harlem Theatre Collection ===
Three character dolls from Carlyle Nuera's Harlem Theatre Collection.

- Claudette Gordon (2015)
- Madam LaVinia (2016)
- Selma DuPar James (2017)

=== Byron Lars – Passport Collection ===
Three dolls released in the Passport Collection by American fashion designer Byron Lars. Each doll is a multicultural and biracial character from a different part of the world.

- Ayako Jones (2009) is Blasian, being of African and Japanese descent.
- Charmaine King (2010) is Afro-French, being of African and French descent, specifically Monaco.
- Fenella Layla (2011) is Afro-Scottish, being of African and Scottish descent. Her fashion is a fusion of Kente Cloth and Scottish Tartan.

== See also ==
- List of Barbie films
