= Carol Spencer =

American fashion designer

- Born: 1932 (age 93–94)
- Known for: Fashion design for Barbie
- Notable work: Totally Hair Barbie

Carol Spencer (born 1932) is an American fashion designer. Most of her career from the early 1960s until 1999 was devoted to creating fashion for Barbie.

== Early life and education ==
Spencer was born in 1932; until she was three, when her father died, the family lived in Texas. She was raised in Minneapolis; while she was still in school, her mother also died. As a child she made outfits for paper dolls and then, learning from her grandmother, clothing for herself.

She attended Washburn High School, graduating in 1950. In 1955 she graduated with a bachelor of fine arts, concentrating on fashion design, from the Minneapolis College of Art and Design.

== Early career ==
After graduating from college she went to work in New York City for Mademoiselle. She moved back to Minneapolis to design for Wonderalls, a children's clothing manufacturer. She moved to Milwaukee to work designing sportswear.

== Barbie career ==
In 1963 she responded to a blind classified advertisement for a "cost-conscious fashion designer". The employer turned out to be Mattel, and the work was designing clothing for Barbie. As part of the interview process she created several outfits and was hired to work with Ruth Handler and Charlotte Johnson. From then until her retirement in 1999 she designed exclusively for Barbie and other Barbie-universe dolls such as Chelsea, Ken, and Skipper. Because Mattel did not put designers' names on packaging until the mid-1990s, most of her work was uncredited. Her first credited design was Benefit Ball Barbie, which was the first Barbie Mattel gave a credit to. She is the only designer to have her name printed on a doll, the 1996 Golden Jubilee Barbie.

Spencer also designed some of the dolls themselves, including 1992's Totally Hair Barbie and Barbie's poodle, which Spencer modeled on her own dog. She designed Surgeon Barbie after having a biopsy and noticing all the physicians were men. She based some designs on her own clothing and accessories.

In 2017 she was inducted into the Women in Toys, Licensing & Entertainment Hall of Fame.

== Dressing Barbie ==
Spencer wrote Dressing Barbie, a 2019 coffee-table retrospective of her work.

== Personal life ==
Spencer was engaged once, prior to attending college.

She retired in 1999.

She lives in Los Angeles.

== See also ==
- Kitty Black Perkins
