= Mattel, Inc. v. MCA Records, Inc. =

Series of lawsuits between Mattel and MCA Records

Mattel v. MCA Records
- Court: United States Court of Appeals for the Ninth Circuit
- Full case name: Mattel, Inc. v. MCA Records, Inc.
- Argued: December 5, 2000
- Decided: July 24, 2002
- Citation: 296 F.3d 894 (9th Cir. 2002)

Case history
- Prior history: Appeal from C.D. Cal. (28 F.Supp.2d 1120)
- Subsequent history: Request for certiorari, S.Ct.; denied (537 U.S. 1171).

Holding
- Barbie Girl is protected as a parody under the trademark doctrine of nominative use and under the First Amendment to the U.S. Constitution.

Court membership
- Judges sitting: Dorothy Nelson, Melvin Brunetti, Alex Kozinski

Case opinions
- Majority: Kozinski, joined by unanimous court

Laws applied
- U.S. Const. amend I; Lanham Act (15 U.S.C. § 1051 et seq)

Mattel v. MCA Records, 296 F.3d 894 (9th Cir. 2002), was a series of lawsuits between Mattel and MCA Records that resulted from the 1997 hit single "Barbie Girl" by Danish-Norwegian group Aqua. The case was ultimately dismissed.

== Background ==
On September 11, 1997, Mattel filed suit in the United States District Court for the Central District of California, bringing 11 claims against MCA (Aqua's American record label) and others. Mattel claimed the song violated the Barbie trademark and turned Barbie into a sex object, referring to her as a "Blonde Bimbo." They alleged the song had violated their copyrights and trademarks of Barbie, and that its lyrics had tarnished the reputation of their trademark and impinged on their marketing plan. Mattel also claimed that the cover packaging of the single used Barbie pink, a registered trademark owned by Mattel. MCA contested Mattel's claims and filed a counterclaim for defamation after Mattel had likened MCA to a bank robber. MCA's lawyers also cited the earlier Bild Lilli doll – a German adult-oriented novelty toy which served as the basis for the original Barbie dolls – in their defense against Mattel's claims that Aqua sexualized the doll.

MCA moved to dismiss Mattel's complaint for failure to state a claim, which the Central District of California granted. Mattel then appealed to the Ninth Circuit. On appeal, the Ninth Circuit ruled the song was protected as a parody under the trademark doctrine of nominative use and the First Amendment to the United States Constitution, in an opinion penned by Judge Alex Kozinski; in reaching that result the court adopted the Rogers test set out by the Second Circuit in Rogers v. Grimaldi for use of trademarks in expressive works. The Ninth Circuit also dismissed MCA's defamation counterclaim. Kozinski concluded his ruling by famously saying, "The parties are advised to chill." Mattel sought certiorari to the Supreme Court of the United States, but its petition was denied.

== Response ==
The controversy was used as an example by journalist Naomi Klein in her book No Logo, where she stated that the monopolies created by copyrights and trademarks are unfairly and differently enforced, based on the legal budgets of the conflicting parties.

In 2009, as part of a marketing strategy to revive doll sales, Mattel released a promotional video featuring a version of "Barbie Girl" with modified lyrics. In 2023, the soundtrack of the Mattel-produced film Barbie included the song "Barbie World" by rappers Nicki Minaj and Ice Spice, which samples Aqua's single.

In a 2023 interview with Rolling Stone, the band recalled how the controversy only served to provide free publicity to both sides of the case despite Mattel's attempts to suppress the song on the grounds of trademark infringement. When asked about Mattel licensing the song to promote the Barbie brand, Aqua's lawyer Russell Frackman saw the irony in Mattel demanding the band to license the rights to use the brand for the song, only for Mattel themselves to license the rights to use the song from MCA. Nystrøm agreed, opining that "that's what they should have done from the start." Mattel has also since spoken positively about the song, stating that "We love the song and seeing the brand celebrated in pop culture."

== See also ==
- Tom Forsythe, a Utah artist unsuccessfully sued by Mattel (Mattel Inc. v. Walking Mountain Productions) over his controversial works featuring Barbie dolls
