= Mattel Inc. v. Walking Mountain Prods. =

Legal case regarding copyrights

- Court: United States Court of Appeals for the Ninth Circuit
- Decided: Dec 29, 2003
- Citations: Mattel Inc. v. Walking Mountain Productions, 353 F.3d 792 (9th Cir. 2003)

Court membership
- Judges sitting: Louis Oberdorfer, Harry Pregerson, Sidney Thomas

Mattel Inc. v. Walking Mountain Productions, 353 F.3d 792 (9th Cir. 2003), was a case between Mattel and Tom Forsythe in which Mattel sued Forsythe for the production and sale of photographs portraying "Barbie" dolls. Mattel alleged that Forsythe's use of Barbie's name and likeness in his "Food Chain Barbie" photo series infringed on their copyrights, trademarks, and trade dress. The court held that Mattel's trademark and trade dress claims were "groundless or unreasonable" and therefore ordered Mattel to pay $1.8 million in legal fees to Forsythe under the Lanham Act.

== See also ==
- Tom Forsythe, the Utah photographer sued by Mattel in this case
- Mattel, Inc. v. MCA Records, Inc., a lawsuit between Mattel and MCA Records involving the song "Barbie Girl" by Aqua
