= Kirby White (general practitioner) =

Australian general practitioner and inventor

- Born: Charlton
- Education: University of Notre Dame Australia; University of Melbourne; Deakin University
- Medical career
- Profession: General practitioner

Kirby White is an Australian general practitioner in Bendigo and an inventor. She was named Victoria's "Local Hero" and nominated for the 2021 Australian of the Year awards. Mattel created a 'Dr Kirby White' Barbie doll to honour her efforts during the COVID-19 pandemic.

== Early life and education ==
White attended Deakin University, where she graduated with a degree in biological sciences in 2005. She moved to the University of Melbourne for graduate studies. After graduating, she worked as a medical scientist in Melbourne. She eventually returned to academia, working toward a Bachelor of Medicine, Bachelor of Surgery at the University of Notre Dame Australia.

== Career ==
White works as a general practitioner in Bendigo. In the earlier days of the COVID-19 pandemic in Australia, White realised that they would run out of disposable gowns by the third week. She launched Gowns for Doctors, an initiative that received over $40,000 in crowd funding to create re-usable, launderable hospital gowns. Kirby then worked with commercial textile companies and volunteers to create thousands of gowns.

White was nominated as Victoria's "Local hero" at the Australian of the Year awards for creating washable, reusable gowns for doctors treating patients with COVID-19.

In August 2021, Barbie announced they were creating a White Barbie doll honouring her efforts to protect frontline staff during the COVID-19 pandemic.

== Personal life ==
White has two children and enjoys classic vintage cars.
