= Stacey McBride-Irby =

American doll designer

Stacey McBride-Irby is an American doll and toy designer. McBride-Irby is known for creating the So In Style line of dolls for Mattel, featuring mixed race features and ethnicities.

== Background ==
McBride-Irby grew up playing with Barbie dolls and decided to become a doll designer at age 13. McBride-Irby later went to design dolls for Mattel. At Mattel, McBride-Irby designed the Alpha Kappa Alpha collector doll, to commemorate the sorority's 100th anniversary. McBride-Irby would design Barbie dolls for Mattel for 15 years.

=== So In Style ===
In 2009, McBride-Irby was the lead designer behind the So In Style line of fashion dolls featuring dolls with natural hair textures, fuller lips and pronounced cheekbones. McBride-Irby was inspired to develop the line to create dolls that were reflective of her daughter and community. At the time, So In Style was celebrated for breaking barriers, but reviews on the doll line were mixed.

=== One World Doll Project ===
After leaving Mattel, McBride-Irby co-founded the One World Doll Project. The company aimed to make aspirational dolls for all races featuring ethnicities from around the world. The One World Doll Project's Prettie Girls line created dolls that children of mixed races could connect with, featuring natural hair and articulation. The One World Doll Project launched a series of commemorative collector's dolls in support of Barack Obama's 2012 election. In 2015, the One World Doll Project merged with the Tonner Doll Company.

=== McIrby ===
In 2018, McBride-Irby launched McIrby, a diversity consultancy.

In 2024, McBride-Irby's work developing black Barbie dolls for Mattel was featured in the documentary, Black Barbie.

== See also ==
- Kitty Black Perkins
