= Barbie Shanghai =

Barbie store in Shanghai, China

Coordinates: 31.22089°N 121.4684°E

- Headquarters: 550 Huai Hai Middle Road, Shanghai, China

Barbie Shanghai was the first Mattel Barbie flagship store in the world. Located in Shanghai, China, this 35,000-square-foot (3,300 m^{2}) store held the world's largest and most comprehensive collection of Barbie dolls and licensed Barbie products. It ceased activities in March 2011.

== Construction ==
Mattel worked with BIG, the branding and design division of Ogilvy & Mather, to develop the creative concept, identify a location, explore featured activities and identify partners. Slade Architecture led the design including the exterior, interior, fixtures and furnishings.

== Services ==
Spa treatments, hair and nail services, and skincare products were available. The Design Center allowed girls to become a fashion designer in a 30-minute experience of the steps of the design process (inspiration, concept, prototypes, fabrics etc.). In the end, girls could sit down at a computer to create their own doll. In the Fashion Runway, girls could experience a runway show by getting dressed in fashions from world-renowned designers. The Barbie Cafe was a collaboration with Australian celebrity chef David Laris. The bar had karaoke, a DJ, and pink martinis, known as Barbietinis. Barbie chocolates were available, also created by the Australian celebrity chef David Laris.
