= Leyla Piedayesh =

German fashion designer

- Born: 1970 (age 54–55); Tehran, Iran
- Occupation: Fashion designer
- Known for: Lala Berlin label
- Website: lalaberlin.com

Leyla Piedayesh (born 1970) is an Iranian-born German fashion designer. She is the founder of the Lala Berlin fashion label.

== Career ==
Piedayesh founded Lala Berlin in 2004, originally as a knitwear brand. The first boutique shop was opened in 2006.

Piedayesh's designs are now available globally in more than 60 stores. Piedayesh has shown Lala Berlin several times during Copenhagen Fashion Week.

Before becoming a full-time designer, Piedayesh was an editor of the Designerama television segment for MTV Berlin.

In 2015, she was a judge of the Designer Nest Awards during Copenhagen fashion week.

In 2017, as part of International Women's Day, Barbie honored 17 contemporary and historical female role models. Piedayesh became the first German to have a Barbie created in her image.

== Personal life ==
She was born in Teheran.
