= Sara and Dara dolls =

Iranian toy doll line

Sara and Dara dolls are Iranian toys. They were first introduced in March 2002, as an alternative to the Barbie doll. 100,000 of the dolls were made in the first round of production by a manufacturer in Hong Kong.

The dolls cost less than Barbie dolls, and are meant to promote Persian culture, even though they have not been as successful. Sara and Dara are available in different styles, modeled after a traditional clothing.

== Gender ==
Sara is a girl doll while Dara is a boy doll.

== Timeline ==
2012: Iranian government issues a ban over Unislamic dolls such as Barbie.

== See also ==
- Fulla a 29 cm doll - an Islamic doll
- Sara & Dara 29 cm dolls - Islamic dolls - Iran
- Jenny a 27 cm doll
- Barbie a 29 cm doll
- Bratz a 25 cm doll
- Licca-chan a 21 cm doll - Japan
