= Totally Hair Barbie =

American toy

- 1991 Totally Hair Brunette/Blonde Barbie® + Ken®
- Type: Fashion doll
- Invented by: Ruth Handler; Carol Spencer; Jill Barad
- Company: Mattel
- Country: United States
- Availability: 1992–1996

Totally Hair Barbie (also known as Ultra Hair Barbie in Europe and Maxi Hair Barbie in Brazil) is a fashion doll, in the Barbie line by Mattel, that was released in 1992. The doll's extra-long hair reached all the way to her toes and at the time, she had the longest hair ever for a Barbie doll at 11.5 inches in length. She is notable for being the highest selling Barbie doll in history, having racked up $100 million worldwide in 1992.

== Product and history ==
Totally Hair Barbie was designed by Carol Spencer. The doll debuted in 1992 with several versions available: standard blonde Barbie, a brunette Barbie (which was significant because it was the first time in 20 years that a brunette Barbie was produced), African American Barbie, Totally Hair Ken, Totally Hair Skipper, Totally Hair Courtney, and a Totally Hair Whitney. The Barbie's accessories included a Scrunchie, hair clips, hair tie, comb, DEP styling Hair gel, the dress, and her signature pink heels. Fashion packs were also released alongside the dolls to redress them. A Totally Hair Barbie Styling Head was also released. The doll was marketed at the time as being the longest haired Barbie, until she was dethroned by Jewel Hair Mermaid Barbie in 1996.

More than ten million Totally Hair Barbie dolls were sold worldwide, making Totally Hair Barbie the best-selling Barbie doll in Mattel's history. Totally Hair Barbie was a hit with children between 1992 and around 1995, holding a record for the world's longest successful toy sale, being on the market for about four years.

In 2017, Mattel rereleased the doll for her 25th anniversary, and it is generally faithful to the original, with some minor changes, such as a lack of the hair gel and the inclusion of a booklet, a certificate of authenticity, a doll stand, and the hair being a different material, as the original had Kanekalon hair while the reproduction has Saran hair. Mattel had to switch their hair material to Saran after the Kanekalon manufacture discontinued production in 2017. Barbie's hair being made of a different material compared to the original was what resulted in the exclusion of the hair gel. This version was marketed towards adult collectors with the inclusion of the commemorative look-book and text on the box stating "for Barbie fans to treasure all over again."

== Popularity ==
In the 1970s, Mattel discovered that hair play was a popular feature. By the 1990s, most of their dolls had long hair to braid, cut, and groom. Totally Hair Barbie belonged to an official line of dolls, like Hollywood Hair Barbie and Cut 'n Style Barbie, made specifically for hair play.

Ultra Hair Barbie became a top-selling Barbie at Mattel due to its innovative feature of having extremely long hair that allowed children to style and cut Barbie’s hair. Additionally, the doll came with fashion accessories and outfits that were popular and trendy at the time of its release. To further capitalize on this hair play, Mattel released African American dolls designed with similarly long, straight hair.

Despite its initial success, Totally Hair Barbie was looked down upon by parents: her long hair and short dress were believed to signify a sex appeal. Some parents expressed that they thought she looked like a mistress and were concerned with which messages this would send to their children.

It wasn't until later in the 90s when Mattel began making Barbie’s waist slightly larger, in a more realistic figure.

== Pop culture references ==
Totally Hair Barbie resurfaced in the media with the 2023 live-action film Barbie, starring Margot Robbie. During her press tour for film, Robbie paid homage to the Totally Hair Barbie by crimping her long blonde hair and wearing a similar swirl-patterned mini dress. In the movie, Totally Hair Barbie was (uncredited) played by Australian actress Ashleigh Brewer.
