= Kitty Black Perkins =

Toy fashion designer

- Born: Louvenia Black; 1946 or 1947 (age 79–80); Spartanburg, South Carolina
- Education: Los Angeles Trade Technical College
- Occupation: Fashion designer
- Years active: 1971-2003
- Known for: Fashion designer for Barbie, creator of the first Black Barbie
- Awards: Doll of the Year award, 1994 Woman of the Year honoree of National Counsel of Negro Women

Louvenia "Kitty" Black Perkins is an African American fashion designer. The majority of her career was spent designing clothing for Barbie dolls. She designed the first Black Barbie, launched in 1980; previous Black dolls in the line were marketed as Barbie's friends.

== Early life and education ==
Black Perkins was born in racially segregated Spartanburg, South Carolina. The daughter of Luther Black and Helen Goode Black, she is one of seven children. In 1967 she graduated from Carver High School, Spartanburg's Black high school, which closed when the school system was desegregated in 1970. She moved to California to attend Los Angeles Trade Technical College. Black graduated with an associate degree in fashion design in 1971.

== Career ==
Black Perkins worked in non-doll fashion for six years before responding to a blind classified ad from Mattel. She reports never having had a Barbie doll until she purchased one to prepare for the interview. She became principal designer for Barbie in 1978. In 1991 The Los Angeles Times reported that Black-Perkins was responsible for over 100 designs a year, amounting to over one fifth of all of the designs for Barbie. She has received the doll industry's highest honor, the Doll of the Year (DOTY) award.

Black Perkins was Chief Designer of Fashions and Doll Concepts for Mattel's Barbie line for over twenty-five years. Her designs include the "First Black Barbie" (1980), "Shani and Friends" (1991) a short-lived line of African-American dolls, "Holiday Barbie" (1988, 1989, 1990, 1996), "Fashion Savvy Barbie" (1997), "Bathtime Barbie" and "Brandy" (1999).

Black Perkins is featured in the documentary Black Barbie, which premiered at the 2023 South by Southwest film festival.

== Recognition ==
In 1994 she was named a Woman of the Year honoree by the National Council of Negro Women. She is also an inductee into the Black Hall of Fame.

In May 2001, Mattel donated a Barbie that Black-Perkins designed for the permanent collection of the South Carolina State Museum. It is a Barbie dressed in a pink satin and tulle ball gown with a double row of rosettes at the hem.

In 2020, Bill Greening designed the 40th Anniversary First Black Barbie Doll in honor of Black Perkins, who was his mentor. At the time, Mattel faced criticism that a white man was responsible for designing a black doll. In response, Black Perkins publicly announced support for Greening's work on the doll, saying that “You don’t have to be Black to design Black.”

In 2025, Greening and Kitty Black Perkins collaborated to design and release the 45th Anniversary Kitty Black Perkins Barbie Doll.

== Personal life ==
Black Perkins is divorced and has two children.

== See also ==
- Bill Greening
- Stacey McBride-Irby
- Carol Spencer
