= Sonia Peronaci =

Italian food blogger and author

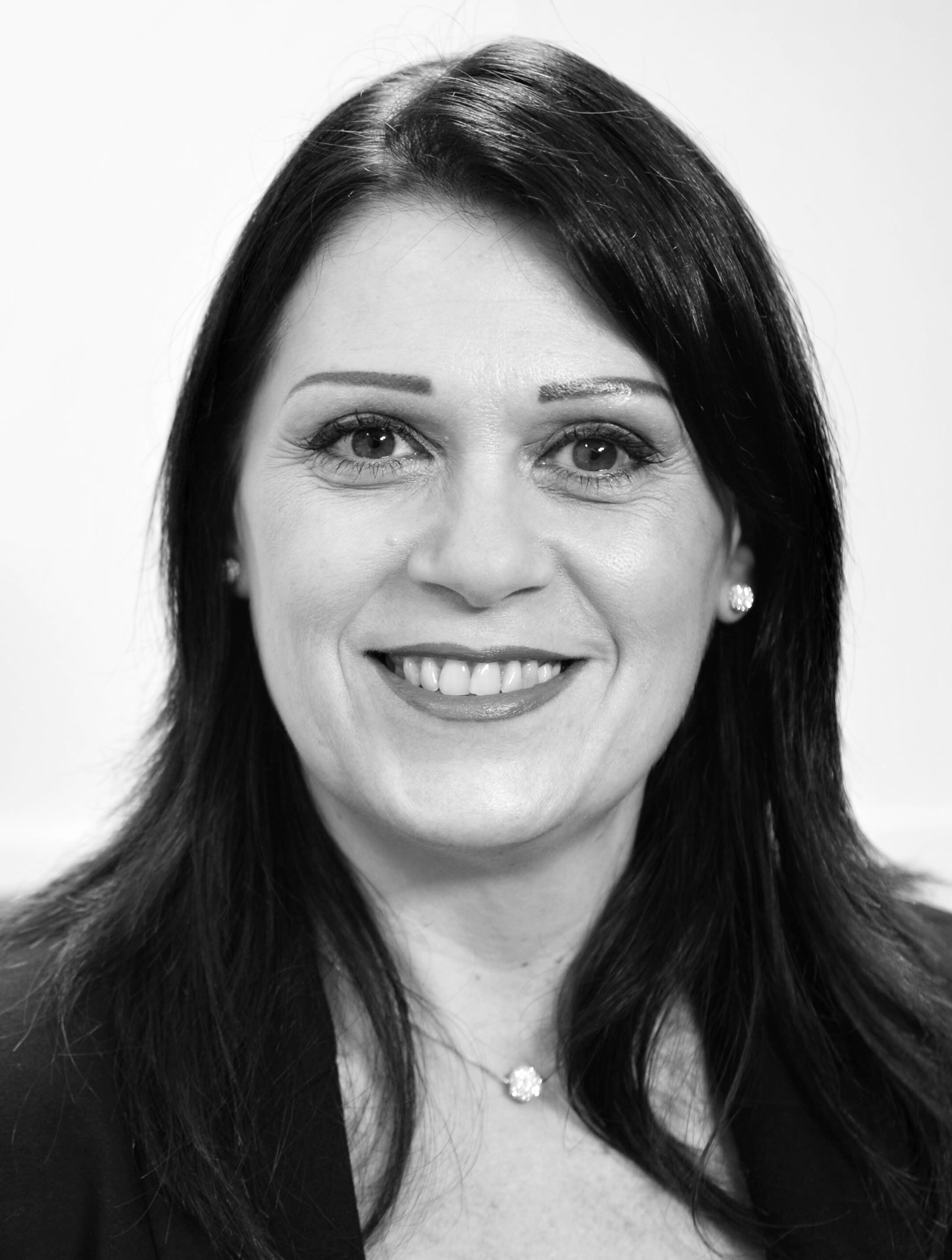
- Born: August 10, 1967; Milan, Italy

Sonia Peronaci is an Italian food blogger and media personality. She became nationally known for her website and vlog, GialloZafferano ('YellowSaffron'), which she founded with her then-partner and now husband Francesco Lopes. It became the most-consulted food blog in Italy, with a documented four million users per month. She sold it in 2015, and today is a cookbook author and television personality. Later she reported feeling "sidelined" from her own creation. The publication Italia a Tavola ('Italy at Table') presents her as a national opinion leader and "superstar" in food and cooking.

In 2022, Mattel designed a Barbie doll to honor her in their Role Models campaign for International Women's Day.
