= Slade Architecture =

American architecture firm

- Industry: Architecture
- Founded: 2002
- Founder: James and Hayes Slade
- Headquarters: New York
- Website: sladearch.com

Slade Architecture is a New York City based architecture and design firm founded in 2002 by Hayes and James Slade. The firm has completed a diverse range of domestic and international projects. Its work has been exhibited and published widely. The Architectural League of New York selected Slade Architecture as a winner of its 2010 Emerging Voices, an annual invited competition for North American firms and individuals with distinct design voices and significant bodies of realized work. Slade Architecture was selected by the New York City Department of Design & Construction to participate in its Excellence in Design and Construction Program in 2004, 2006, 2009, and 2016.

Among Slade Architecture's awards are national and regional AIA awards, SARA National and regional Design Awards, several Best of Year awards from Interior Design magazine, Association of Retail Environments Store of the Year Award, Chain Store Age Best in Show Award, Fast Company Masters of Design issue, Contract magazine Best of the Year Award in Retail and Businessweek/Architectural Record Design Excellence Award.

Slade's work has been shown at the Venice Biennale and the Museum of Modern Art in New York. The firm's work has been published in Architectural Record Metropolis magazine and Interior Design magazine. Slade has completed architectural and interior design projects and installations in the US, China and South Korea.

== Principal background ==
=== Hayes Slade, AIA ===
Hayes Slade is a co-founder of Slade Architecture. In addition to her role at the firm, Hayes is an active member of the broader architecture community including the AIA. She was the 2019 President of the NY Chapter of the American Institute of Architects. She has Bachelor of Science and Master of Engineering degrees from Cornell University as well as an MBA from the Wharton School of Business. She has lectured widely and taught design at Parsons the New School for Design and Syracuse University School of Architecture.

Hayes has been recognized with a variety of honors including the Architectural League of New York Emerging Voices. Hayes previously worked in London and New York at Arup, Boston Consulting Group and SOM.

=== James Slade, FAIA, LEED AP ===
James Slade has a Bachelor of Arts degree from Cornell University and a Masters of Architecture degree from Columbia University where he was awarded an Honor Award for Excellence in Design on graduation. James was recognized by the Architectural League of New York's League Prize in 2000 and was a juror for the program the following year. He was selected as a finalist in the 2003 MoMA /PS1 Young Architects Program. In 2010, he was selected for the Architecture League of New York's Emerging Voices. He is a licensed architect in New York, New Jersey, Florida, Missouri, Pennsylvania and Wyoming and a LEED-AP, NCARB and IIDA.

He was elevated to the American Institute of Architect's College of Fellows (FAIA) in 2016.

In addition to his work at Slade Architecture, he has taught design studios at Parsons The New School for Design, Syracuse University, Barnard College at Columbia University, Pratt Institute, Florida International University and Philadelphia University.

Before Slade Architecture, he was a founding partner of Cho Slade Architecture.

== Select projects ==
- Ordos 100, Mongolia, China
- Dalki Theme Park and Shop, Heyri, South Korea (2000)
- Nam June Paik Museum Competition Entry, Kyonggi, South Korea (2002)
- PS1 Warm Up Competition Entry (2003)
- Miami Residence, Miami, Florida (2003)
- Lever House Office Renovation, New York (2004)
- Aperture Foundation New York (2004)
- Monitor Hyperlink Tower Competition Entry, Milan, Italy (2004)
- Montessori Progressive Learning Center, Queens, New York (2005)
- Barbie Shanghai Flagship Store, Shanghai, China (2008)
- Kenig Residence, New York(2008)
- Avalon Bowery Place, New York (2008)
- 184 Kent Avenue, Brooklyn, New York (2010)
- Flight Club, New York (2010)
- W hotel Lounge for Fashion Week 2010 New York (2010)
- Virgin Atlantic Clubhouse, Newark Airport, Newark, New Jersey (2012)
- Virgin Atlantic Clubhouse, JFK Airport, Queens, New York (2012)
- Staten Island Zoo, Staten Island, New York (2014)
- Virgin Atlantic Clubhouse, Los Angeles Airport (2015)
- Flight Club LA, Los Angeles, (2016)
- Bockee Lane House, Amenia, New York (2017)

== Exhibitions ==
- "Second Nature", Young Architect's Award. Architectural League of New York. Urban Center, New York (2002)
- Miami Biennale Exhibition, Nam June Paik Museum competition entry
- "OPEN: New Designs for Public Space", Van Alen Institute (2003)
- Florida International University (2003)
- Barnard College, New York (2004)
- "Hyperlink Tower" Milan Furniture Fair, Milan, Italy (April 2004)
- Venice Biennale International Architecture Exhibition, Venice, Italy (fall 2004)
- "OPEN: New Designs for Public Space", National Building Museum, Washington, DC (2005)
- "A New Pleasure", American Institute of Architects, San Francisco (2006)
- "OPEN: New Designs for Public Space", Chicago Architecture Foundation (2006)
- "Young Americans - New Architecture" in the US, Deutsch Architecture Museum (2007)
- Interior Design magazine Idea Lab. Interface Flor (2009)
- "Buildings = Energy", Center for Architecture Foundation (2011)
- DIFFA Dining by Design. New York (2011)
- DIFFA Dining by Design, New York (2012)
- "FOR_PLAY", Syracuse University, Syracuse, New York (31 January 2012 - 23 March 2012)
- "Blueprint Cinema", London Design Festival, London, UK (20 September 2012)
- "Design By NY", 2012 American Institute of Architects Subway Show. AIA New York (October 2012)
- "Hip Hop Design", 2014 AIA Convention, Chicago, Illinois (2013)
- DIFFA Dining by Design, New York (2013)
- Grohe Showroom, New York (2014)
- Bauhaus Museum Dessau, Bauhaus Dessau Foundation, Dessau Germany (2015)
- "Guggenheim Helsinki Now", Kunsthalle Helsinki, Finland (2015)
- "Olana Summer House Exhibition", Olana State Historic Site, Hudson, New York (fall 2016)
- "Olana Summer House Exhibition", Center for Architecture, New York (April 2017)

== Awards ==
- Project for the West Side of Manhattan. International Making Cities Livable Conference. Exhibition Award Recipient Carmel, California, March 1998 (1998)
- Progressive Architecture Award, Von Erlach Residence (1999)
- Young Architect's Award, Architectural League of New York, New York (2000)
- New York City DDC Design Excellence Program: 1 of 24 firms prequalified by the NYC DDC (2003)
- Progressive Architecture Awards, Dalki Theme Park and Shop (2003)
- American Institute of Architects New York Design Award. Award of Merit, Architecture, Dalki Theme Park and Shop (2004)
- Platinum Award for Engineering Excellence, ACEC New York, 2000’ television transmission tower (2005)
- American Institute of Architects New York Design Award. Award of Merit, Interior, Miami Residence (2006)
- Interior Design magazine Best of Year, Award of Merit, Residential: Apartment / Condo (Miami residence) (2006)
- New York City Housing Authority Term Contract Awarded (2006)
- New York City DDC Design Excellence Program: 1 of 24 firms prequalified by the NYC DDC (2006)
- Interior Design magazine Best of Year, Award of Merit, Commercial: Small Office, Lever House (2007)
- Interior Design magazine Best of Year, Winner, Residential Urban House, Kenig Residence (2008)
- Interior Design magazine Best of Year, Award of Merit, Public Space, Avalon Bowery Place (2008)
- New York City Public Design Commission, Award for Excellence in Design, Help 1 Residence (2010)
- International Store Design Competition. Winner, Large Format Specialty Store, Barbie Shanghai (2010)
- International Store Design Competition. Winner, Innovative Concept, Barbie Shanghai (2010)
- Interior Design magazine Best of Year, Winner, Retail: Other, Barbie Shanghai (2010)
- Event Design Awards. Gold Prize, Best Retail Environment, Barbie Shanghai (2010)
- Contract Magazine Interior Awards. Winner, Retail, Barbie Shanghai (2010)
- Retail Interiors Awards. Best International Retail Interior, Barbie Shanghai(2010)
- Fast Company. Master of Design Issue, Barbie Shanghai (2010)
- London International Creative Competition, Winner, Interior Design, Barbie Shanghai (2011)
- Interior Design magazine Best of Year, Winner, Kitchen and Bath, E. 67th Street Bathroom (2011)
- Interior Design magazine Best of Year, Award of Merit, Retail: Other, Flight Club (2011)
- 2011 Building Brooklyn Awards, Winner, Adaptive Reuse, 184 Kent Ave (2011)
- Electrolux Icon: Tomorrow's Modern Kitchen Design Competition, 2nd Place (2011)
- Association for Retail Environments, Outstanding Merit, Softline Specialty Store Up to 3,000sf (2011)
- American Institute of Architects 2010 Small Project Awards. Award of Merit, Pup Tent (2011)
- Interior Design magazine Best of Year, Award of Merit, Public Space, 184 Kent Ave (2011)
- Association for Retail Environments, Winner, Store of the Year, Barbie Shanghai (2011)
- Association for Retail Environments, Winner, Specialty Store over 25,000sf, Barbie Shanghai (2011)
- Association for Retail Environments, Winner, Store Fixture Awards, Barbie Shanghai (2011)
- Retail Design Institute Store Design Awards, Winner, Innovative Concept, Barbie Shanghai (2011)
- Retail Design Institute Store Design Awards, Winner, Specialty Store over 10,000sf, Barbie Shanghai (2011)
- Chain Store Age Awards, Winner, Store of the Year, Barbie Shanghai (2011)
- Chain Store Age Awards, Winner, Attraction Retailing, Barbie Shanghai (2011)
- Chain Store Age Awards, Winner, Cashwrap and Fitting Room, Barbie Shanghai (2011)
- Interior Design magazine Best of Year, Winner, Lounge/Bar, Virgin Atlantic Clubhouse at JFK (2012)
- 2012 FX International Design Awards, Winner, Leisure or Entertainment Venue, Virgin Atlantic Clubhouse at JFK Airport, (2012)
- American Institute of Architects New York Design Awards, Award of Merit, Interiors, Barbie Shanghai (2012)
- 2012 MetalMag Architectural Awards. Winner, Interior, Virgin Atlantic Clubhouse at JFK Airport (2012)
- London International Creative Competition, Winner, Interior Design, Virgin Atlantic Clubhouse at JFK (2012)
- American Institute of Architects New York Design Awards. Award of Merit, Interiors, Virgin Atlantic Clubhouse at JFK Airport (2013)
- Interior Design magazine Best of Year, Award of Merit, Kitchen & Bath, Sullivan Street Duplex (2014)
- Interior Design magazine Best of Year, Award of Merit, Outdoor, Staten Island Zoo Carousel (2014)
- American Institute of Architects New York State Design Awards, Citation for Design, Interiors, Virgin Atlantic Clubhouse at Los Angeles Airport (2015)
- American Institute of Architects New Jersey State Design Awards, Award of Merit, Interiors, Virgin Atlantic Clubhouse at Newark Airport (2015)
- Interior Design magazine MakeIt Work Awards, Winner, Reception Area, Virgin Atlantic Clubhouse at Los Angeles Airport(2015)
- Interior Design magazine Best of Year, Award of Merit, Bar/Lounge, Virgin Atlantic Clubhouse at Los Angeles Airport (2015)
- New York City DDC Design Excellence Program (2016-current)
- Los Angeles Business Journal Commercial Real Estate Awards, Winner, Hospitality Project of the Year, Virgin Atlantic Clubhouse at Los Angeles Airport (2016)
- Interior Design magazine Best of Year, Award of Merit, Shining Moment, Flight Club expansion (2016)
- Innovation by Design Awards, Fast Company, Laying the Groundwork (2016)
- Society of American Registered Architects, National Design Award of Merit, Interiors, Virgin Atlantic Clubhouse at JFK Airport (2016)
- Society of American Registered Architects National Design Award of Merit, Virgin Atlantic Clubhouse at Newark Airport (2017)
- Interior Design magazine Best of Year, Environmental Branding, Smile Direct Club Flagship, New York (2017)
- American Institute of Architects Los Angeles Restaurant Design Awards: Popular Choice, Lounge/Nightclub, Virgin Atlantic Clubhouse at Los Angeles Airport (2018)
- American Institute of Architects Los Angeles Restaurant Design Awards: Winner, Lounge/Nightclub, Virgin Atlantic Clubhouse at Los Angeles Airport (2018)
- Retail Design Institute Awards: Winner, Innovative Concept, Flight Club LA (2018)
- Retail Design Institute Awards: Winner, Soft Line Goods (Flight Club LA) (2018)
- Top 50 American Interior Architecture Firms, The Architect's Newspaper (2018)
