= Tom Forsythe =

American artist

- Born: Tom Forsythe
- Known for: Artist
- Notable work: "Food Chain Barbie" "Personal Illusions" "TV Watching" "Random Observations"
- Website: www.tomforsythe.com

Tom Forsythe is an American artist and tai chi instructor who lives and works in Utah. He is known for his photographic work of Barbie dolls, which caused some controversy resulting from a lawsuit brought against him by Mattel. The company lost the case, Mattel Inc. v. Walking Mountain Prods. (9th Cir. 2003), when the United States Court of Appeals for the Ninth Circuit ruled that the images were original artwork in 2004.

== Career ==
=== Art ===
Forsythe is best known for his famous "Barbie" portraits, portraying Barbie dolls in surprising situations usually without clothes and often juxtaposed with some sort of kitchen or cooking appliance. This line of art is called the "Food Chain Barbie". In each composition, Forsythe shows the world as seemingly mad. His work has been described as "unappetizing". In the words of Judge Pregerson, "in some of Forsythe's photos, Barbie is about to be destroyed or harmed by domestic life in the form of kitchen appliances, yet continues displaying her well-known smile, disturbingly oblivious to her predicament".

The main reason behind Forsythe's use of the Barbie is that the doll is seen as an American icon. When Barbie came out, the doll was supposed to represent beauty and (according to Forsythe) gave a false idea of how women were supposed to look and act. Forsythe chose to use the dolls in his art because he wanted to attempt to put the sexist idea to rest.

Marjorie Heins, in a Brennan Center report titled Will Fair Use Survive, said, "the benefits to the public in allowing such use - allowing artistic freedom and expression and criticism of a cultural icon - are great" adding that "it serves the aims of the Copyright Act by encouraging the very creativity and criticism the act protects."

According to Forsythe, Barbie represents the idea of "perfection" and how women are supposed to look and act.

=== Current work ===
Forsythe is the owner of the Little Hollywood Museum in Kanab, Utah, and has been a tai chi instructor for over 20 years. His current work has included setting up an online tai chi class.

== Mattel Inc. v. Walking Mountain Productions (9th Cir. 2003) ==
Forsythe's art theme, “Barbie's power as a beauty myth”, attracted legal attention. After displaying his work at art fairs in Utah and Missouri, Mattel Inc. took notice of his use of their copyrighted doll. Mattel objected to the fact that Forsythe had been using the image of their product, and they sued Forsythe in 1999 for copyright and trademark infringement. After several years of appeals, a federal judge instructed Mattel to pay Forsythe's legal fees of more than $1.8 million. The 9th Circuit Court ruled that Forsythe's art did not violate the fair use doctrine, which allows limited, unlicensed use of copyrighted material for purposes such as criticism or commentary. Accordingly, the court ruled in Forsythe's favor that the Copyright Act applied in the case of his work.

=== Reactions ===
Many artists and feminists were glad to hear that Forsythe had won the case. To them, the case made a statement that copyright is "destructive to the free exchange of ideas". To Forsythe, the case was a victory in the fight for free speech. He felt that he was using a form of art to show how political and social ideals play in our world today.

Forsythe felt that the case taught him a lesson about the US legal system, saying:

From what I've learned in the course of defending my very basic free speech rights, this is a fairly standard cost of fighting a legal battle in federal court. It only confirms what I've always sensed, that the legal system is little more than a boxing ring for the rich with the common people not even invited to experience the proceedings on pay per view. We may be free to express ourselves, but if that expression involves offending a rapacious corporation, they're equally free to sue; and unless we have the wherewithal to fight off high powered attorneys, that's where our free speech ends.
