= Francie (Barbie) =

Barbie doll model

Francie Fairchild is a fashion doll issued by Mattel from 1966 to 1976 and re-introduced in 2011. Marketed as "Barbie's MODern cousin", the doll had an extensive line of "mod"-style clothing, often employing bright colors and geometric patterns similar to fashions associated with Carnaby Street in the late 1960s to early 1970s. At 11¼ inches tall, the Francie doll was shorter than Barbie, but taller than Skipper, making the character presumably between the two in age.

== Origin ==
In 1965, Mattel began to consider changing Barbie to reflect modern trends of the times. Fearful of losing their core customer base, they decided to produce a "test" doll first, and introduced Francie in 1966. She featured a body reflecting that of a young teen, with a smaller bust, flip hairdo, rooted lashes (on the models with bendable legs only) and a slight figure. Some believe that the Francie doll may have been based on the character "Gidget", whose real name was Frances Lawrence (sometimes called Francie). The Francie doll was such a smash hit that she led the way for Barbie's makeover and MOD debut in 1967. There was also a less popular Francie model without bendable legs.

== Models and variations ==
Francie came in several configurations over the course of her decade-long run, beginning with a straight leg model (1966–1968) and a "bend leg" doll (1966–1967). "Twist 'N Turn" dolls were issued beginning in 1967, then with a short flip hairstyle from 1969–1970 and finally in a no-bangs hairstyle in 1971. All of these dolls were available in blonde or brunette and had rooted lashes, except for the straight leg dolls, who had painted lashes.

In the 1970s, several hair-related variations of the Francie doll were issued: "Hair Happenin's Francie" in 1970-1972, a "Growin' Pretty Hair" model from 1971-1973 both in blonde only; and a "Quick Curl Francie" with brunette hair in 1973-1974. A tanned version of Francie, "Malibu Francie" was made from 1971 to 1976 with blonde hair, blue eyes and utilized the Casey head mold. "Busy Francie" (1972–1973) was a blonde doll designed with a hand that was able to grip small objects. 1975's "Baggie Francie", so called because she was sold in a clear plastic bag as opposed to a box, was the last of the Francie dolls and was made with brunette hair.

A "colored Francie", issued in 1967, was the first doll in the Mattel line with a truly dark complexion. However, the doll did not have typical African American features, since it was made with the same head molds as the Caucasian Francie doll. Because of this, a doll named Christie, issued in 1968, is often considered the first true African American doll in the Barbie line. "Black Francie" was not labeled as "Barbie's MODern cousin."

A German variation of Francie was produced and sold in 1972. Made with a different head mold, but the same body type as her US counterparts, she was sold only in Germany and produced as a standard doll and a "Busy" variation. These dolls had blonde hair and blue eyes.

In addition to the German issue, there are several Japan market exclusive variations of the Francie doll. Francie was hugely popular there, and the Japanese market dolls, and exclusive fashions produced for them, are the most valuable and sought after items amongst collectors today. The rarest of all the Francie dolls is the Japanese Sun Sun Malibu Francie. Essentially a Malibu Francie with deep suntan, but using the original Francie head mold with rooted lashes and long Brunette Sidepart hair, as opposed to the American issue which used the Casey head mold, no rooted lashes, blue eyes and had blonde sideparted hair. The dolls were produced in extremely limited number and when they are marketed for sale on the collectors market they command a price of $1000 and upwards.

Francie has been reproduced by Mattel five times: 1996, as a bend leg doll in brunette with a reproduction swimsuit and Gad-Abouts outfit; 1997, as Black Francie (limited to 5,000 dolls) wearing a reproduction of The Wild Bunch; 2005, as a blonde no-bangs Francie, wearing a reproduction of Smashin' Satin; in 2016, as a brunette wearing a reproduction of Miss Teenaged Beauty; and again in 2022 as Black Francie wearing a reproduction of Floating In.

== Francie's friends ==
A second doll in Francie's size, Casey, was issued as "Francie's fun friend" from 1967 and came in blonde or brunette. That same year a Twiggy doll (based on the famous fashion model) was also made, resembling Casey but with heavier painted-on "makeup". The Twiggy doll was made through 1968, and Casey through 1970. Casey returned briefly in 1975 as "Baggie Casey", but she was made with the same head mold as Francie.

In the 1971 Mattel catalog, there were pictures of a new doll named "Becky". She was made from the Casey head mold, was hand painted and shown in blonde, although prototypes of her were made in blonde, brunette and redhead. Eventually, for reasons unknown, Mattel decided not to mass produce Becky. Some 1971 fashions could be found in stores labeled as being for "Francie and her new friend Becky" and are highly sought after by collectors. In 2009, Mattel released the Becky doll called "Most Mod Party Becky", and featured Becky with ash blond hair, 3 outfits, shoes, brush, and accessories such as a phone, tray, drinks, party invitations, and record player with record.

The Japanese market had an exclusive friend of Francie, named Tuli-Chan. She was sold in 1974, and had the Quick Curl Francie body. A set of her own outfits was also sold.

== 2011 Silkstone Re-introduction ==
In November of 2011, Mattel re-introduced Francie to the adult doll collector with two exclusive dolls. Francie now had a Silkstone body with fashions designed by Robert Best which was a dealer exclusive doll in a matching red and white check hat, jacket and mini skirt with a dog. "Nighty Brights" was a gift set available only to Barbie Fan Club members that included both a day look and pajamas. Mattel released two more Silkstone Francie dolls in August 2012. "Fuchsia 'N Fur" is a Barbie Fan Club exclusive African-American version of Francie wearing a pink faux-fur coat. "Kitty Corner" is a Gold Label release wearing an A-line dress and includes a night gown set with kitten slippers, as well as a cat.
