= Byron Lars =

American fashion designer (born 1965)

- Born: 19 January 1965 (age 61); Oakland, California
- Labels: Byron Lars Shirt Tales; Green-T; Byron Lars Beauty Mark

Byron Lars is an American fashion designer. He began designing under his own label in 1991. As part of that season's success, Women's Wear Daily named him "Rookie of the Year." Retailers to carry his work include Bergdorf, Saks Fifth Avenue, Bloomingdales, Henri Bendel, Neiman-Marcus, and Anthropologie. His current label is named Byron Lars Beauty Mark.

In 2012, Lars designed dresses for Olympic gold medalists Sanya Richards-Ross, Carmelita Jeter, and Allyson Felix.

Michelle Obama wore a dress from Lars's Beauty Mark line to the 2011 September 11 commemoration and in a portrait of the First Family.

Lars has designed custom clothes for Barbie dolls since 1997 and has designed at least 19 dolls.

Lars is a graduate of El Cerrito High School, Brooks College, and Fashion Institute of Technology.

He was honored with Pratt Institute's Visionary Award on May 1, 2014.
