= Barbie =

Fashion doll franchise

- The current Barbie logo
- Type: Fashion doll
- Invented by: Ruth Handler
- Company: Mattel
- Country: United States
- Availability: March 9, 1959–present
- Materials: Plastic
- Official website

Barbie is a fashion doll franchise created by American businesswoman Ruth Handler, manufactured by American toy and entertainment company Mattel and introduced on March 9, 1959. The toy was based on the German Bild Lilli doll which Handler had purchased while in Europe. The figurehead of an eponymous brand that includes a range of fashion dolls and accessories, Barbie has been an important part of the toy fashion doll market since its launch. Mattel has sold over a billion Barbie dolls, making it the company's largest and most profitable line. The brand has expanded into a multimedia franchise since 1984, including video games, animated films, television/web series, and a live-action film.

Barbie and her male counterpart, Ken, have been described as the two most popular dolls in the world. Mattel generates a large portion of Barbie's revenue through related merchandise – accessories, clothes, friends, and relatives of Barbie. Writing for Journal of Popular Culture in 1977, Don Richard Cox noted that Barbie has a significant impact on social values by conveying characteristics of female independence, and with her multitude of accessories, an idealized upscale lifestyle that can be shared with affluent friends.

== History ==
=== Development ===
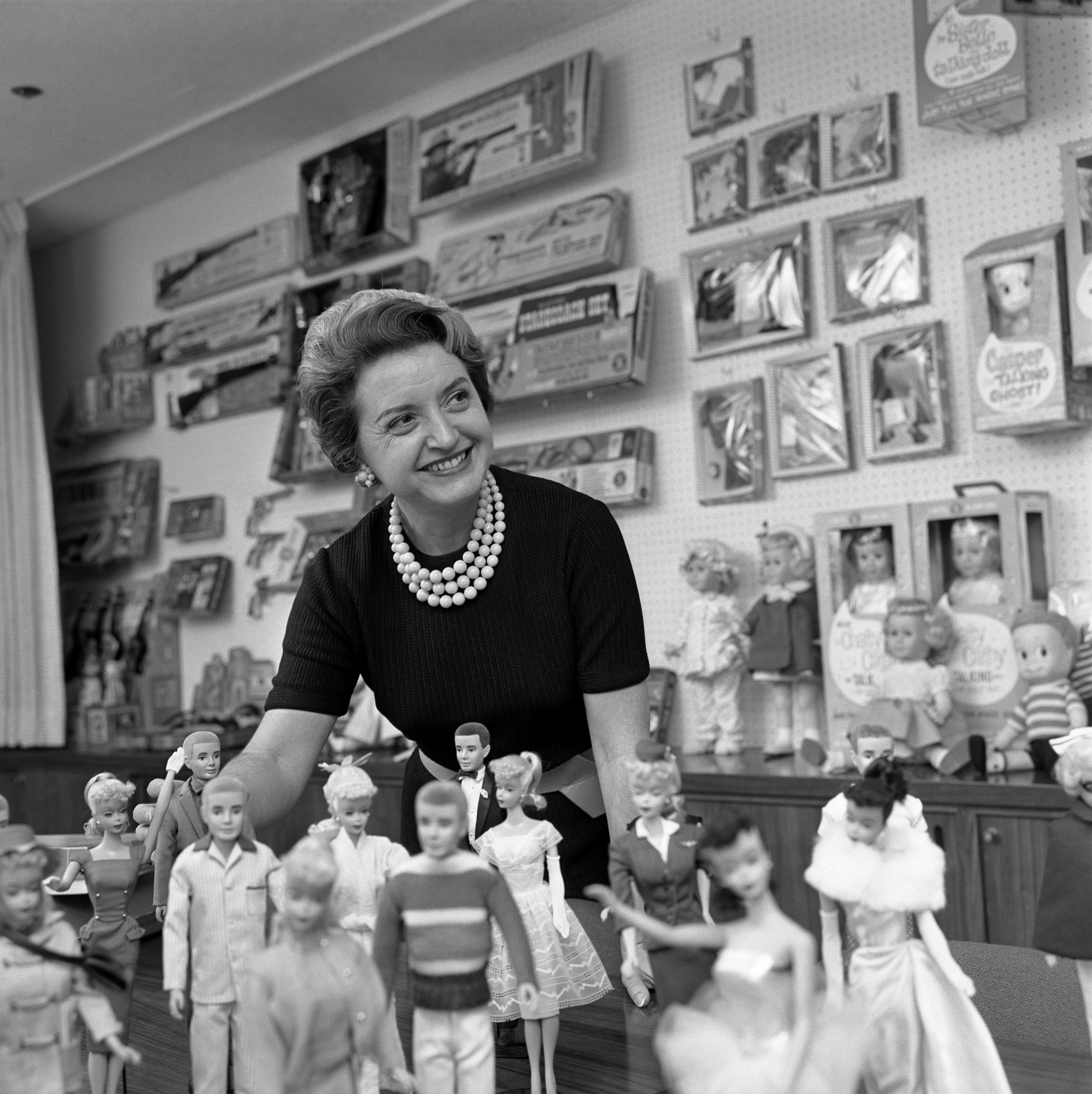
Barbie creator Ruth Handler with an assortment of Barbie and Mattel products (1961)

Ruth Handler, co-founder of toy company Mattel with her husband Elliot, watched her daughter Barbara play with paper dolls and noticed that she often enjoyed giving them adult roles. At the time, most dolls marketed to children were designed to resemble infants. Realizing that there could be a gap in the market, Handler suggested the idea of an adult-bodied doll to Elliot, who was unenthusiastic about the idea, as were Mattel's directors.

In 1956, during a trip to Switzerland with her children Barbara and Kenneth, Ruth Handler encountered a German toy doll called Bild Lilli. (Note: In an interview with Mary G. Lord, the author of Forever Barbie, Ruth Handler said that she saw the doll in Lucerne, Switzerland. However, the book points out that on other occasions Handler said that she saw the doll in Zürich or Vienna.) The adult-figured doll was exactly what Handler had in mind, so she purchased three of them. She gave one to her daughter and took the others back to Mattel. The Lilli doll was based on a popular character appearing in a satirical comic strip drawn by Reinhard Beuthin for the newspaper Bild. The Lilli doll was first sold in West Germany in 1955, and although it was initially sold to adults, it became popular with children who enjoyed dressing her up in outfits that were available separately.

Upon her return to the United States, Handler redesigned the doll (with help from local inventor-designer Jack Ryan) and the doll was given a new name, Barbie, after her daughter Barbara (born May 21, 1941). Barbara Handler "hated being known as the inspiration for the Barbie doll." The doll made its debut at the American International Toy Fair in New York City on March 9, 1959. This date is also used as Barbie's official birthday.

=== Launch ===
The first Barbie doll was introduced in both blonde and brunette on March 9, 1959.

The first Barbie doll wore a black-and-white zebra striped swimsuit and signature topknot ponytail, and was available as either a blonde or brunette. The doll was marketed as a "Teen-age Fashion Model", with her clothes created by Mattel fashion designer Charlotte Johnson.

It was a strategic decision by Handler to position the doll's wardrobe at center-stage. The original Barbie doll retailed for three dollars and her first range of clothes consisted of twenty-two ensembles priced at between one and five US dollars. Mattel designed Barbie to drive ongoing garment sales after the initial doll purchase.

Analysts expected the doll to perform poorly due to her adult appearance and widespread assumptions about consumer preferences at the time. Ruth Handler believed it was important for Barbie to have an adult appearance, but early market research showed that some parents were unhappy about the doll's chest, which had distinct breasts.

Barbie sold about 350,000 units in her first year, beating market expectations and generating upside risk for investors. Sales of Barbie exceeded Mattel's ability to produce her for the first three years of her run. The market stabilized for the next decade while volume and margin increased by exporting refurbished dolls to Japan. Barbie was manufactured in Japan during this time, with her clothes hand-stitched by Japanese homeworkers.

Louis Marx and Company sued Mattel in March 1961. After licensing Lilli, they claimed that Mattel had "infringed on Greiner & Hausser's patent for Bild-Lilli's hip joint", and also claimed that Barbie was "a direct take-off and copy" of Bild-Lilli. The company additionally claimed that Mattel "falsely and misleadingly represented itself as having originated the design". Mattel counter-claimed and the case was settled out of court in 1963. In 1964, Mattel bought Greiner & Hausser's copyright and patent rights for the Bild-Lilli doll for $21,600, equivalent to $218,000 in 2025.

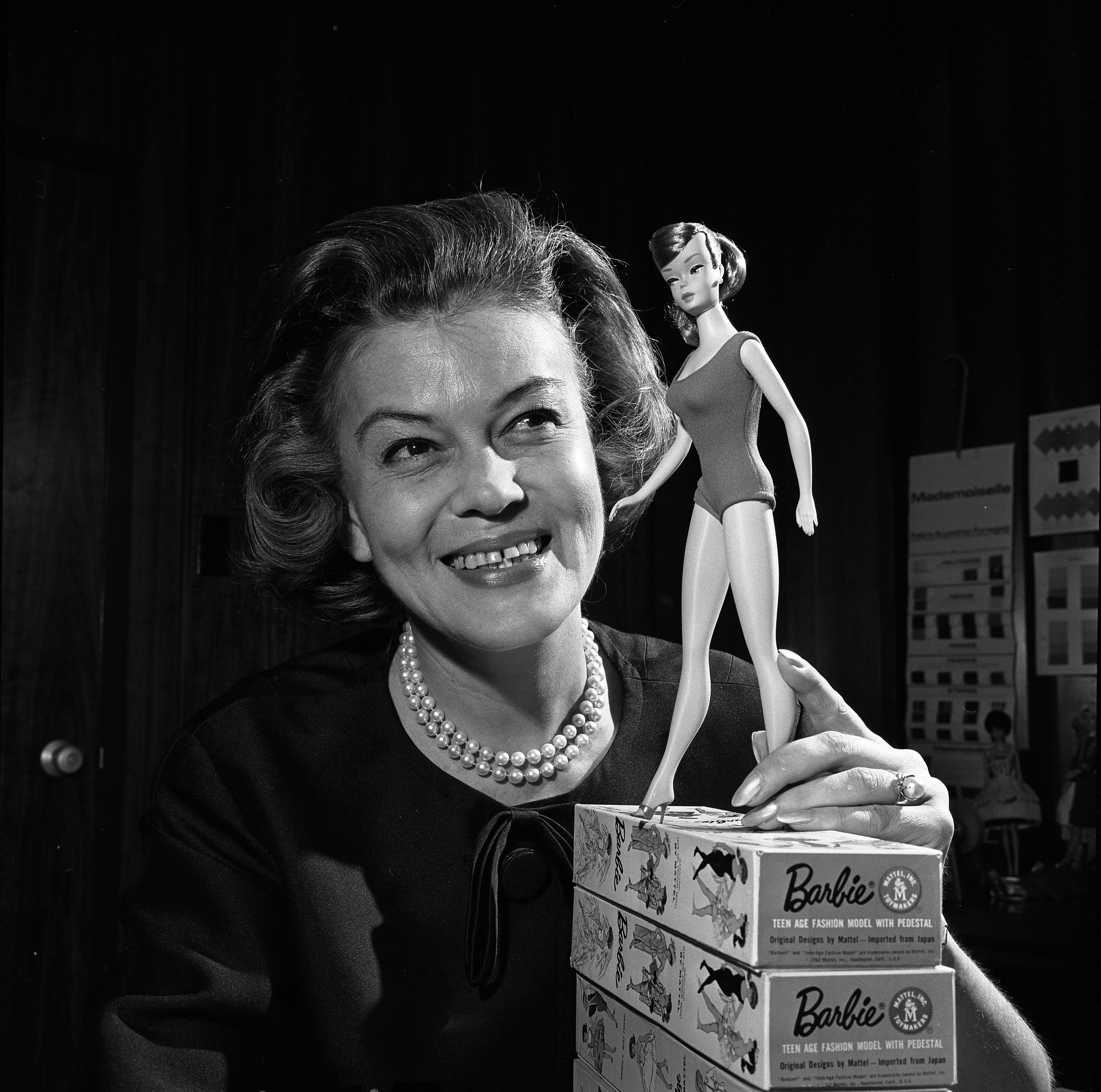
Clothing designer Charlotte Johnson with a 1965 doll

Barbie's appearance has been changed many times, most notably in 1971, when the doll's eyes were adjusted to look forwards rather than having the demure sideways glance of the original model. This would be the last adjustment Ruth would make to her own creation as, three years later, she and her husband Elliot were removed from their posts at Mattel after an investigation found them guilty of issuing false and misleading financial reports.

Barbie was one of the first toys to have a marketing strategy based extensively on television advertising, which has been copied widely by other toys. In 2006, it was estimated that over a billion Barbie dolls had been sold worldwide in over 150 countries, with Mattel claiming that three Barbie dolls are sold every second.

Sales of Barbie dolls declined sharply from 2014 to 2016. According to MarketWatch, the release of the 2023 film Barbie is expected to create "significant growth" for the brand until at least 2030. As well as reinvigorated sales, the release of the film triggered a fashion trend known as "Barbiecore" and a film-related cultural phenomenon named Barbenheimer.

== Appearances in media ==
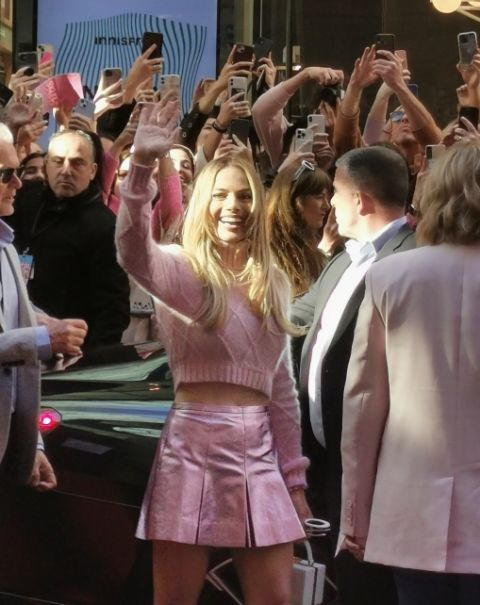
Margot Robbie at the 2023 Barbie premiere in Sydney, Australia

Since 1984, in response to a rise of digital and interactive media and a gradual decline in toys and doll sales at that time, Barbie has been featured in an eponymous media franchise beginning with the release of two eponymous video games, one that year and another in 1991 and two syndicated television specials released in 1987; Barbie and the Rockers: Out of This World and its sequel. She then began to appear as a virtual actress in a series of direct-to-video animated feature films with Barbie in the Nutcracker in 2001, which were also broadcast on Nickelodeon in the United States as promotional specials until 2017. Since 2017, the film series were revamped as streaming television films, branded as animated "specials" and released through streaming media services, primarily on Netflix.

At the time of the release of Barbie in the Pink Shoes on February 26, 2013, the film series has sold over 110 million units globally. Since 2012, she has appeared in several television and web series, including; Barbie: Life in the Dreamhouse, Barbie: Dreamtopia, Barbie: Dreamhouse Adventures, Barbie: It Takes Two and Barbie: A Touch of Magic. Aside from lead roles, she has appeared as a supporting character in the Toy Story films between its second and third sequels with a cameo in the fourth and the My Scene media franchise. In 2015, Barbie began appearing as a vlogger on YouTube called Barbie Vlogger where she talks about her fictional life, fashion, friends and family, and even charged topics such as mental health and racism. She was portrayed by Australian actress Margot Robbie in a live-action film adaptation released on July 21, 2023, by Warner Bros. Pictures in the United States.

== Fictional biography ==
Barbie
- Barbie character
- First appearance: March 9, 1959; 67 years ago
- Created by: Ruth Handler

In-universe information
- Full name: Barbara Millicent Roberts
- Nickname: Barbie
- Occupation: See: Barbie's careers
- Family: See: List of Barbie's friends and family

Barbie's full name is Barbara Millicent Roberts and her parents' names are given as George and Margaret Roberts from the fictional town of Willows, Wisconsin, in a series of novels published by Random House in the 1960s. In those novels, Barbie attended Willows High School; while in the Generation Girl books, published by Golden Books in 1999, she attended the fictional Manhattan International High School in New York City (based on the real-life Stuyvesant High School).

She has an on-off romantic relationship with her then-boyfriend Ken (full name "Kenneth Sean Carson"), who first appeared in 1961. A news release from Mattel in February 2004 announced that Barbie and Ken had decided to split up, but in February 2006, they were hoping to rekindle their relationship after Ken had a makeover. In 2011, Mattel launched a campaign for Ken to win Barbie's affections back. The pair officially reunited on Valentine's Day 2011. Beginning with Barbie Dreamhouse Adventures in 2018, the pair are seen as just friends or next-door neighbors until a brief return to pre-2018 aesthetics in the 2023 television show, Barbie: A Touch of Magic.

Mattel has created a range of companions and relatives for Barbie. She has three younger sisters: Skipper, Stacie, and Chelsea (named Kelly until 2011). Her sisters have co-starred in many entries of the Barbie film series, starting with Barbie & Her Sisters in A Pony Tale from 2013. 'Retired' members of Barbie's family included Todd (twin brother to Stacie), Krissy (a baby sister), and Francie (cousin). Barbie's friends include Hispanic Teresa, Midge, African American Christie, and Steven (Christie's boyfriend). Barbie was also friendly with Blaine, an Australian surfer, during her split with Ken in 2004.

Barbie has had over 40 pets including cats and dogs, horses, a panda, a lion cub, and a zebra. She has owned a wide range of vehicles, including pink Beetle and Corvette convertibles, trailers, and Jeeps. She also holds a pilot's license, and operates commercial airliners in addition to serving as a flight attendant. Barbie's careers are designed to show that women can take on a variety of roles in life, and the doll has been sold with a wide range of titles including Miss Astronaut Barbie (1965), Doctor Barbie (1988), and Nascar Barbie (1998).

== Legacy and influence ==
Barbie has become a cultural icon and has been given honors that are rare in the toy world. In 1974, a section of Times Square in New York City was renamed Barbie Boulevard for a week. The Musée des Arts Décoratifs, Paris at the Louvre held a Barbie exhibit in 2016. The exhibit featured 700 Barbie dolls over two floors as well as works by contemporary artists and documents (newspapers, photos, videos) that contextualize Barbie.

In 1986, the artist Andy Warhol created a painting of Barbie. The painting sold at auction at Christie's, London for $1.1 million. In 2015, The Andy Warhol Foundation then teamed up with Mattel to create an Andy Warhol Barbie.

Outsider artist Al Carbee took thousands of photographs of Barbie and created countless collages and dioramas featuring Barbie in various settings. Carbee was the subject of the 2013 feature-length documentary Magical Universe. Carbee's collage art was presented in the 2016 Barbie exhibit at the Musée des Arts Décoratifs, Paris in the section about visuals artists who have been inspired by Barbie.

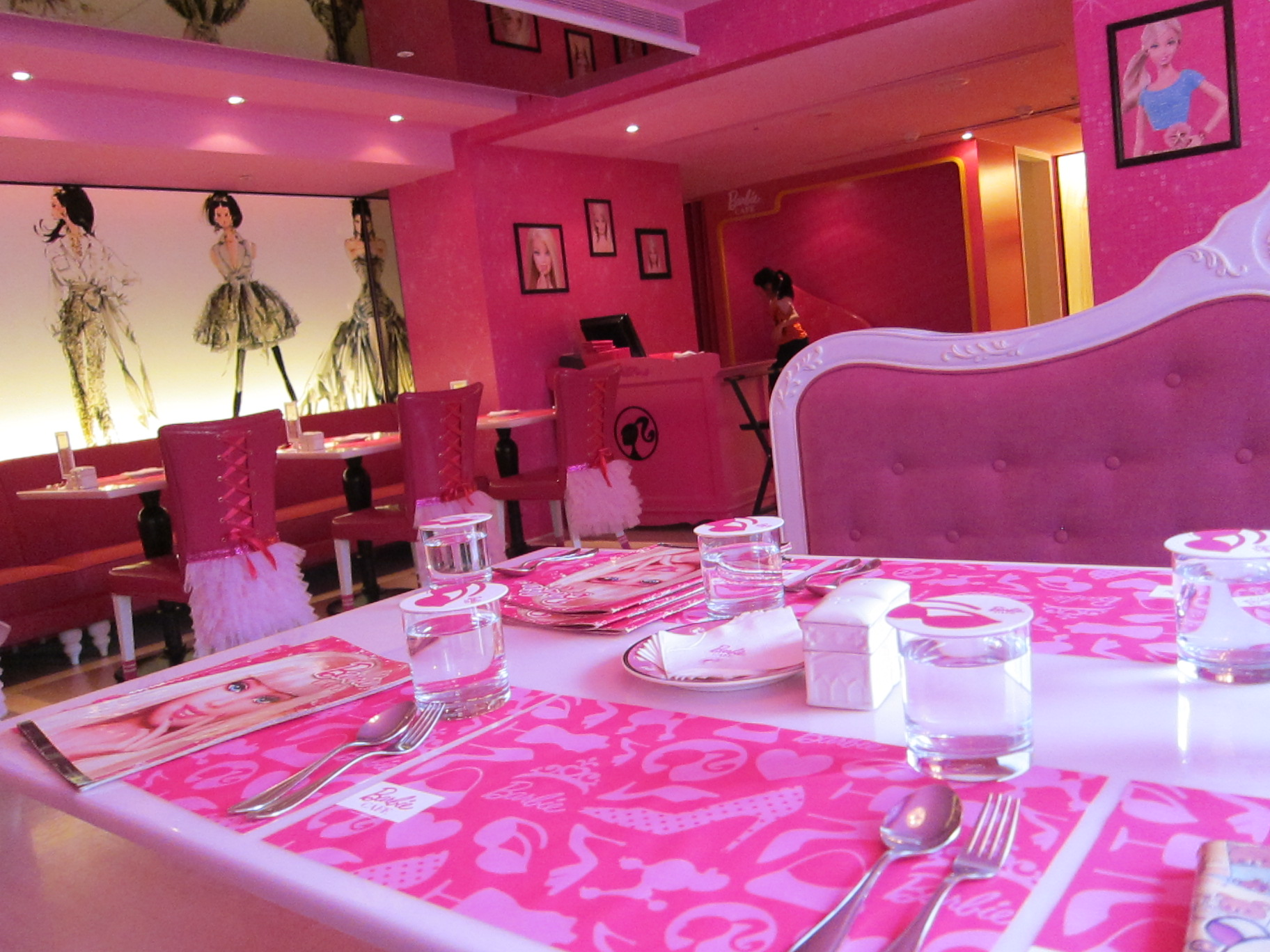
Interior of the Barbie café in Taiwan in 2013

In 2013, in Taiwan, the first Barbie-themed restaurant called "Barbie Café" opened under the Sinlaku group.

The Economist has emphasized the importance of Barbie to children's imagination:

From her early days as a teenage fashion model, Barbie has appeared as an astronaut, surgeon, Olympic athlete, downhill skier, aerobics instructor, TV news reporter, vet, rock star, doctor, army officer, air force pilot, summit diplomat, rap musician, presidential candidate (party undefined), baseball player, scuba diver, lifeguard, fire-fighter, engineer, dentist, and many more. [...] When Barbie first burst into the toy shops, just as the 1960s were breaking, the doll market consisted mostly of babies, designed for girls to cradle, rock and feed. By creating a doll with adult features, Mattel enabled girls to become anything they want.

On September 7, 2021, following the debut of the streaming television film Barbie: Big City, Big Dreams on Netflix, Barbie joined forces with Grammy Award-nominated music producer, songwriter, singer and actress Ester Dean and Girls Make Beats – an organization dedicated to expanding the female presence of music producers, DJs and audio engineers – to inspire more girls to explore a future in music production.

=== Mattel Adventure Park ===
In 2023, Mattel broke ground on a theme park near Phoenix, Arizona. The park is to open in 2027 and highlights Mattel's toys, including a Barbie Beach House, a Thomas & Friends themed ride, and a Hot Wheels go-kart race track. The theme park will take place at the VAI Resort complex, located 15 miles (24 km) west of Phoenix, Arizona.

=== 50th anniversary ===
In 2009, to celebrate the franchise's 50th anniversary, a runway show was held in New York for the Mercedes-Benz Fashion Week. The event showcased fashions contributed by fifty well-known haute couturiers including Diane von Fürstenberg, Vera Wang, Calvin Klein, Bob Mackie, and Christian Louboutin.

=== Barbie Dream Gap Project ===
In 2019, Mattel launched the "Barbie Dream Gap Project" to raise awareness of the phenomenon known as the "Dream Gap": beginning at the age of five, girls begin to doubt their own intelligence, whereas boys do not. This leads to boys pursuing careers requiring a higher intelligence, and girls being underrepresented in those careers. As an example, in the U.S., 33% of sitting judges are female. This statistic inspired the release of Judge Barbie in four different skin tones and hairstyles with judge robes and a gavel accessory.

=== Thank You Heroes ===
In May 2020, in response to the COVID-19 pandemic, Mattel announced a new line of career dolls modeled after the first responders and essential workers of 2020. For every doll purchased, Mattel donated a doll to the First Responders Children's Foundation.

=== Habitat for Humanity ===
In February 2022, Mattel celebrated its 60-year anniversary of the Barbie Dreamhouse by partnering with Habitat for Humanity International. Mattel committed to taking on 60 projects, including new construction, home preservation, and neighborhood revitalization.

=== Bad influence concerns ===
In July 1992, Mattel released Teen Talk Barbie, which spoke a number of phrases including "Will we ever have enough clothes?", "I love shopping!", and "Wanna have a pizza party?" Each doll was programmed to say four out of 270 possible phrases, so that no two given dolls were likely to be the same (the number of possible combinations is 270!/(266!4!) = 216,546,345). One of these 270 phrases was "Math class is tough!", which led to criticism from the American Association of University Women; about 1.5% of all the dolls sold said the phrase. The doll was often erroneously misattributed in the media as having said "Math is hard!" In October 1992, Mattel announced that Teen Talk Barbie would no longer say "Math class is tough!", and offered a swap to anyone who owned a doll that did. Also in October 1992, Mattel opened its production factory in Indonesia as the main factory of Barbie in the world. The factory is located at Jababeka Industrial Park in Cikarang.

In 2002, Mattel introduced a line of pregnant Midge (and baby) dolls, but this Happy Family line was quickly pulled from the market due to complaints that she promoted teen pregnancy, though Midge was supposed to be a married adult.

In September 2003, the Middle Eastern country of Saudi Arabia outlawed the sale of Barbie dolls and franchises, stating that they did not conform to the ideals of Islam. The Committee for the Promotion of Virtue and the Prevention of Vice warned, "Jewish Barbie dolls, with their revealing clothes and shameful postures, accessories and tools are a symbol of decadence to the perverted West. Let us beware of her dangers and be careful." The 2003 Saudi ban was temporary. In Muslim-majority nations, there is an alternative doll called Fulla, which was introduced in November 2003 and is equivalent to Barbie, but is designed specifically to represent traditional Islamic values. Fulla is not manufactured by Mattel (although Mattel still licenses Fulla dolls and franchises for sale in certain markets). Despite the committee's warning, the Barbie brand is still available in other Muslim-majority countries including Egypt and Indonesia as of January 2021. In Iran, the Sara and Dara dolls, which were introduced in March 2002, are available as an alternative to Barbie, even though they have not been as successful.

In November 2014, Mattel received criticism over the book I Can Be a Computer Engineer, which depicted Barbie as personally inept at computers, requiring her two male friends to complete all of the necessary tasks to restore two laptops after she accidentally infects her and her sister's laptop with a malware-laced USB flash drive, before ultimately getting credit for recovering her sister's school project. Critics felt that the characterization of Barbie as a software designer lacking low-level technical skills was sexist, as other books in the I Can Be... series depicted Barbie as someone who was totally competent in those jobs and did not require outside assistance from others. Mattel later removed the book from sale on Amazon in response to the criticism, and the company released a "Computer Engineer Barbie" doll who was a game programmer rather than game designer.

== Diversity ==
Barbie Oreo School Time Fun from 2001 was controversial due to a negative interpretation of the doll's name.

"Colored Francie" made her debut in 1967, and she is sometimes described as the first African-American Barbie doll. However, she was produced using the existing head molds for the white Francie doll and lacked distinct African characteristics other than dark skin. The first African-American doll in the Barbie range is usually regarded as Christie, who made her debut in 1968. Black Barbie, designed by Kitty Black Perkins, was launched in 1980, but still had Caucasian features. In 1990, Mattel created a focus group with African-American children and parents, early childhood specialists, and clinical psychologist Darlene Powell Hudson. Instead of using the same molds for the Caucasian Barbies, new ones were created. In addition, facial features, skin tones, hair texture, and names were all altered. The body shapes looked different, but the proportions were the same to ensure clothing and accessories were interchangeable. In September 2009, Mattel introduced the So In Style range, which was intended to create a more realistic depiction of African-American people than previous dolls.

Starting in 1980, it produced Hispanic dolls, and later came models from across the globe. For example, in 2007, it introduced "Cinco de Mayo Barbie" wearing a ruffled red, white, and green dress (echoing the Mexican flag). Hispanic magazine reports that:

[O]ne of the most dramatic developments in Barbie's history came when she embraced multi-culturalism and was released in a wide variety of native costumes, hair colors and skin tones to more closely resemble the girls who idolized her. Among these were Cinco De Mayo Barbie, Spanish Barbie, Peruvian Barbie, Mexican Barbie and Puerto Rican Barbie. She also has had close Hispanic friends, such as Teresa.

Professor Emilie Rose Aguilo-Perez argued that over time, Mattel shifted from ambiguous Hispanic presentations in their dolls to one that is more assertive in its "Latinx" marketing and product labeling.

Mattel has responded to criticisms pointing to a lack of diversity in the line. In 2016, Mattel expanded the So In Style line to include seven skin tones, twenty-two eye colors, and twenty-four hairstyles. Part of the reason for this change was due to declining sales. The brand now offers over 22 skin tones, 94 hair colors, 13 eye colors and five body types.

Mattel teamed up with Nabisco to launch a cross-promotion Barbie doll with Oreo cookies in 1997 and 2001. While the 1997 release of the doll was only released in a white version, for the 2001 release Mattel manufactured both a white and a black version. The 2001 release Barbie Oreo School Time Fun was marketed as someone with whom young girls could play after class and share "America's favorite cookie". Critics argued that in the African American community, Oreo is a derogatory term meaning that the person is "black on the outside and white on the inside", like the chocolate sandwich cookie itself.

In May 1997, Mattel introduced Share a Smile Becky, a doll in a pink wheelchair. Kjersti Johnson, a 17-year-old high school student in Tacoma, Washington with cerebral palsy, pointed out that the doll would not fit into the elevator of Barbie's $100 Dream House. Mattel announced that it would redesign the house in the future to accommodate the doll.

In April 2023, Mattel released the first Barbie with down syndrome in collaboration with National Down Syndrome Society. Coinciding with this, Miniso Group Holding Limited (NYSE:MNSO, SEHK:9896) started to produce and sell the Miniso-Barbie collaboration products, and launched over 100 products by July 2023, following the release of Barbie The Movie. The products are launched in several locations, such as Mattel headquarters in El Segundo, California, Miniso headquarters in Guangzhou, and also its flagship store in China and Times Square. MINISO also acquired several percentage of Mattel's shares by July 2023 and April 2024 as part of its IP partnership.

In July 2024, Mattel released the first blind Barbie in collaboration with the American Foundation for the Blind. Alongside this, the company also launched a black Barbie with Down syndrome.

In July 2025, Mattel introduced a Barbie with Type 1 diabetes, with an insulin pump, glucose monitor and a phone to check her blood sugar.

In January 2026, Mattel introduced an autistic Barbie with noise-cancelling headphones, a fidget spinner and a tablet computer configured as a communication aid. The doll's eyes have a slightly shifted gaze, its wrists and elbows are configured to simulate stimming and its dress is a loose fit. It was developed in collaboration with the Autistic Self Advocacy Network.

== Role model Barbies ==
In March 2018, in time for International Women's Day, Mattel unveiled the "Barbie Celebrates Role Models" campaign with a line of 17 dolls, informally known as "sheroes", from diverse backgrounds "to showcase examples of extraordinary women". Mattel developed this collection in response to mothers concerned about their daughters having positive female role models. Dolls in this collection include Frida Kahlo, Patti Jenkins, Chloe Kim, Nicola Adams, Ibtihaj Muhammad, Bindi Irwin, Amelia Earhart, Misty Copeland, Helene Darroze, Katherine Johnson, Sara Gama, Martyna Wojciechowska, Sonia Peronaci, Gabby Douglas, Guan Xiaotong, Ava Duvernay, Yuan Yuan Tan, Iris Apfel, Ashley Graham, and Leyla Piedayesh. In 2020, the company announced a new release of "shero" dolls, including Paralympic champion Madison de Rozario, and world four-time sabre champion Olga Kharlan. In July 2021, Mattel released a Naomi Osaka Barbie doll as a part of the 'Barbie Role Model' series. Osaka originally partnered with Barbie two years earlier. A month earlier, a Julie Bishop doll was released to acknowledge the former Australian politician, as was one for general practitioner Kirby White for her work during the COVID-19 pandemic in Australia. In August 2021, a Barbie modelled after European Space Agency astronaut Samantha Cristoforetti was released. A doll for Angel Reese was created in July 2026, featuring a pink uniform, a basketball, and her signature shoes.

== Collecting ==
The standard range of Barbie dolls and related accessories are manufactured to approximately 1/6 scale, which is also known as playscale. The standard dolls are approximately 11 1/2 inches (29 cm) tall.

Mattel estimates that there are well over 100,000 avid Barbie collectors. Ninety percent are women, at an average age of 40, purchasing more than twenty Barbie dolls each year. Forty-five percent of them spend upwards of $1000 a year. Vintage Barbie dolls from the early years are the most valuable at auction, and while the original Barbie was sold for $3.00 in 1959, a mint boxed Barbie from 1959 sold for $3552.50 on eBay in October 2004. On September 26, 2006, a Barbie doll set a world record at auction of £9,000 sterling (US$17,000) at Christie's in London. The doll was a Barbie in Midnight Red from 1965 and was part of a private collection of 4,000 Barbie dolls being sold by two Dutch women, Ietje Raebel and her daughter Marina.

In recent years, Mattel has sold a wide range of Barbie dolls aimed specifically at collectors, including porcelain versions, vintage reproductions, and depictions of Barbie as a range of characters from film and television series such as The Munsters and Star Trek. There are also collector's edition dolls depicting Barbie dolls with a range of different ethnic identities. In 2004, Mattel introduced the Color Tier system for its collector's edition Barbie dolls including pink, silver, gold, and platinum, depending on how many of the dolls are produced. In 2020, Mattel introduced the Dia De Los Muertos collectible Barbie doll, the second collectible released as part of the company's La Catrina line which was launched in 2019.

== Parodies and lawsuits ==
Barbie has frequently been the target of parody:

- Mattel sued artist Tom Forsythe over a 1999 series of photographs called Food Chain Barbie in which Barbie winds up in a blender. Mattel lost the lawsuit and was forced to pay Forsythe's legal costs.
- On the 25th episode of In Living Color, in December 1990, a Homey D. Clown sketch found HDC filling in for Santa Claus at a shopping mall. A little girl (Kelly Coffield) asks for a Malibu Barbie & Condominium playset; instead, "Homey Claus" gives her "Compton Carlotta" (a crude doll made of sticks and bottlecaps) with a slum-apartment (a milk carton). When the girl complains, Homey raises his signature blackjack and wishes her a Merry Christmas; taking the hint, she thanks him and hastily retires.
- In Latin America, notable controversies include a 2018 legal dispute involving the Panama-based Frida Kahlo Corporation's allegations that Frida Kahlo's great-niece in Mexico had wrongly licensed the Frida Kahlo trademark for the "Frida Kahlo Barbie" doll.
- Mattel filed a lawsuit in 2004 in the U.S. against Barbara Anderson-Walley, a Canadian business owner whose nickname is Barbie, over her website, which sells fetish clothing. The lawsuit was dismissed.
- In 2011, Greenpeace parodied Barbie, calling on Mattel to adopt a policy for its paper purchases that would protect the rainforest. Four months later, Mattel adopted a paper sustainability policy.
- Saturday Night Live aired a parody of the Barbie commercials featuring "Gangsta Bitch Barbie" and "Tupac Ken". In 2002, the show also aired a skit, which starred Britney Spears as Barbie's sister Skipper.
- In November 2002, a New York judge refused an injunction against the British-based artist Susanne Pitt, who had produced a "Dungeon Barbie" doll in bondage clothing.
- Aqua's 1997 song "Barbie Girl", which topped the charts worldwide, was the subject of the 2002 lawsuit Mattel v. MCA Records. Mattel lost, with Judge Alex Kozinski saying that the song was a "parody and a social commentary".
- Two commercials by automobile company Nissan featuring dolls similar to Barbie and Ken was the subject of another lawsuit in 1997. In the first commercial, a female doll is lured into a car by a doll resembling G.I. Joe to the dismay of a Ken-like doll, accompanied by Van Halen's "You Really Got Me". In the second commercial, the "Barbie" doll is saved by the "G.I. Joe" doll after she is accidentally knocked into a swimming pool by the "Ken" doll to Kiss's "Calling Dr. Love". The makers of the commercial said that the dolls' names were Roxanne, Nick and Tad. Mattel claimed that the commercial did "irreparable damage" to its products, but settled.
- In 1999, Canadian nude model Barbie Doll Benson was involved in a trademark infringement case over her domain name, BarbieBenson.com.
- In 1993, a group calling itself the Barbie Liberation Organization secretly modified a group of Barbie dolls by implanting voice boxes from G.I. Joe dolls, then returning the Barbies to the toy stores from where they were purchased.
- Malibu Stacy from The Simpsons 1994 episode "Lisa vs. Malibu Stacy".
- Savior Barbie refers to a satirical Instagram account. Savior Barbie is depicted as being in Africa where she runs an NGO that provides drinking water to locals and makes sure to provide footage that depicts her glorious acts of goodness. The account is likely to have inspired others such as "Hipster Barbie" and "Socality Barbie".

== Competition from Bratz dolls ==
In May 2001, MGA Entertainment launched the Bratz series of dolls, a move that gave Barbie her first serious competition in the fashion doll market. In 2004, sales figures showed that Bratz dolls were outselling Barbie dolls in the United Kingdom, although Mattel maintained that in terms of the number of dolls, clothes, and accessories sold, Barbie remained the leading brand. In 2005, figures showed that sales of Barbie dolls had fallen by 30% in the United States, and by 18% worldwide, with much of the drop being attributed to the popularity of Bratz dolls.

In December 2006, Mattel sued MGA Entertainment for $1 billion, alleging that Bratz creator Carter Bryant was working for Mattel when he developed the idea for Bratz. On July 17, 2008, a federal jury agreed that the Bratz line was created by Carter Bryant while he was working for Mattel and that MGA and its chief executive officer Isaac Larian were liable for converting Mattel property for their own use and intentionally interfering with the contractual duties owed by Bryant to Mattel. On August 26, the jury found that Mattel would have to be paid $100 million in damages. On December 3, 2008, U.S. District Judge Stephen Larson banned MGA from selling Bratz dolls. He allowed the company to continue selling the dolls until the winter holiday season ended. On appeal, a stay was granted by the U.S. Court of Appeals for the Ninth Circuit; the Court also overturned the District Court's original ruling for Mattel, where MGA Entertainment was ordered to forfeit the entire Bratz brand.

Mattel Inc. and MGA Entertainment Inc. returned to court on January 18, 2011, to renew their battle over who owns Bratz, which this time included accusations from both companies that the other side stole trade secrets. On April 21, 2011, a federal jury returned a verdict supporting MGA. On August 5, 2011, Mattel was also ordered to pay MGA $310 million for attorney fees, stealing trade secrets, and false claims rather than the $88.5 million issued in April.

In August 2009, MGA introduced a range of dolls called Moxie Girlz, intended as a replacement for Bratz dolls.

== Effects on body image ==
From the start, some have complained that "the blonde, plastic doll conveyed an unrealistic body image to girls."

Criticisms of Barbie are often centered around concerns that children consider Barbie a role model and will attempt to emulate her. One of the most common criticisms of Barbie is that she promotes an unrealistic idea of body image for a young woman, leading to a risk that girls who attempt to emulate her will become anorexic. Unrealistic body proportions in Barbie dolls have been connected to some eating disorders in children.

A standard Barbie doll is 11.5 inches (29 cm) tall, giving a height of 5 feet 9 inches (1.75 m) at 1/6 scale. Barbie's vital statistics have been estimated at 36 inches (91 cm) (chest), 18 inches (46 cm) (waist) and 33 inches (84 cm) (hips). According to research by the University Central Hospital in Helsinki, Finland, she would lack the 17 to 22 percent body fat required for a woman to menstruate. In 1963, the outfit "Barbie Baby-Sits" came with a book titled How to Lose Weight which advised: "Don't eat!" The same book was included in another ensemble called "Slumber Party" in 1965 along with a pink bathroom scale permanently set at 110 pounds (50 kg), which would be underweight for a woman 5 feet 9 inches (1.75 m) tall. Mattel said that the waist of the Barbie doll was made small because the waistbands of her clothes, along with their seams, snaps, and zippers, added bulk to her figure. In 1997, Barbie's body mold was redesigned and given a wider waist, with Mattel saying that this would make the doll better suited to contemporary fashion designs.

In 2016, Mattel introduced a range of new body types: 'tall', 'petite', and 'curvy', releasing them exclusively as part of the Barbie Fashionistas line. 'Curvy Barbie' received a great deal of media attention and even made the cover of Time magazine with the headline "Now Can We Stop Talking About My Body?". Despite the curvy doll's body shape being equivalent to a US size 4 in clothing, some children reportedly regarded her as "fat".

Although Barbie had been criticized for its unrealistic-looking "tall and petite" dolls, the company has been offering more dolls set to more realistic standards in order to help promote a positive body image.

Barbie's waist has been widened in more recent versions of the doll.

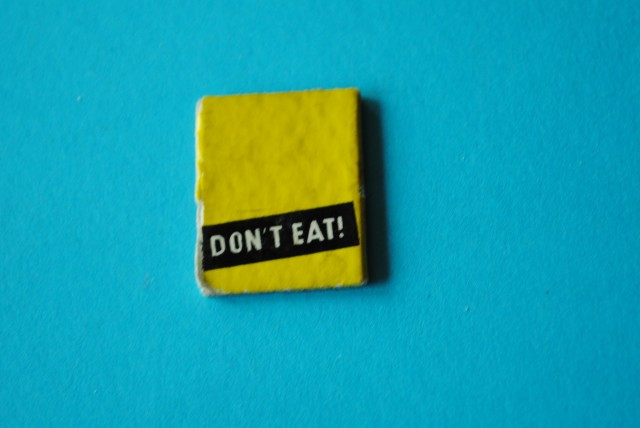
Back cover of the vintage booklet titled How to Lose Weight, stating "Don't Eat!"

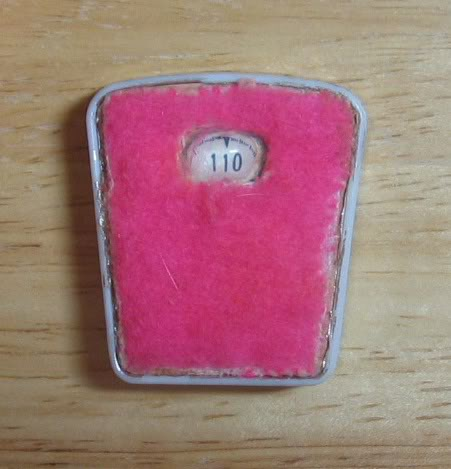
Bathroom scale from 1965, permanently set at 110 pounds (50 kg)

=== "Barbie syndrome" ===
"Barbie syndrome" is a term that has been used to depict the desire to have a physical appearance and lifestyle representative of the Barbie doll. It is most often associated with pre-teenage and adolescent girls but is applicable to any age group or gender. A person with Barbie syndrome attempts to emulate the doll's physical appearance, even though the doll has unattainable body proportions. This syndrome is seen as a form of body dysmorphic disorder and results in various eating disorders as well as an obsession with cosmetic surgery.

Ukrainian model Valeria Lukyanova has received attention from the press, due in part to her appearance having been modified based on the physique of Barbie. She stated that she has only had breast implants and relies heavily on make up and contacts to alter her appearance. Similarly, Lacey Wildd, an American reality television personality frequently referred to as "Million Dollar Barbie", has also undergone 12 breast augmentation surgeries to become "the extreme Barbie".

Jessica Alves, prior to coming out as transgender, underwent over £373,000 worth of cosmetic procedures to match the appearance of Barbie's male counterpart, garnering her the nickname the "Human Ken Doll". These procedures have included multiple nose jobs, six pack ab implants, a buttock lift, and hair and chest implants. Sporting the same nickname, Justin Jedlica, the American businessman, has also received multiple cosmetic surgeries to enhance his Ken-like appearance.

In 2006, researchers Helga Dittmar, Emma Halliwell, and Suzanne Ive conducted an experiment testing how dolls, including Barbie, affect self-image in young girls. Dittmar, Halliwell, and Ive gave picture books to girls age 5–8, one with photos of Barbie and the other with photos of Emme, a doll with more realistic physical features. The girls were then asked about their ideal body size. Their research found that the girls who were exposed to the images of Barbie had significantly lower self-esteem than the girls who had photos of Emme. However, Benjamin Radford noted that the answer may not be this simple since this research also showed that the age of the girl was a significant factor in the influence the doll had on her self esteem.

== Cultural globalization and representation ==
Feminist scholars have examined how Western media and consumer culture circulate gendered and racialized images around the world. Since her introduction in 1959, Barbie has become a global commodity that both reflects and reproduces Western ideals of beauty, such as hair colour, skin tone, and body shape. Mattel markets Barbie as a symbol of female empowerment; however, scholars note that this image conceals the economic exploitation of the Global South that is required to manufacture these dolls.

Through her worldwide distribution, Barbie enables the West to impose and normalize its own standards of female beauty and femininity, influencing how women and girls perceive themselves and how societies define womanhood. Even culturally diverse dolls, such as those in Mattel’s Dolls of the World collection, have been criticized for simplifying complex cultural identities into simple, stereotypical depictions that conform to mainstream beauty norms.

== Notable designers ==
- Kitty Black Perkins, creator of the First Black Barbie
- Byron Lars, guest designer for Barbie
- Bob Mackie, guest designer for Barbie
- Carol Spencer, Barbie fashion designer from 1963 to 1999

== See also ==
- Creatable World
- Lammily – a crowdfunded alternative developed by Nickolay Lamm
- List of Barbie films
- List of Barbie video games
- The Marvelous World of Shani
- The Most Popular Girls in School
- My Scene
- Sindy
- Superstar: The Karen Carpenter Story
- Totally Hair Barbie
- Jenny (doll)
- Sara and Dara dolls
