= Pay gap =

Pay gap may refer to:

- Gender pay gap
  - Gender pay gap in the United States
  - Gender pay gap in Australia
  - Gender pay gap in Russia
  - Gender pay gap in India
  - Gender pay gap in New Zealand
  - Gender pay gap in the United States tech industry
- Racial pay gap in the United States

== See also ==
- Economic discrimination
- Economic inequality
- Equal pay for equal work
- Gay wage gap
- Gender inequality in Mexico
- Gender inequality in China
- Gender inequality in India
- Income inequality metrics
- Motherhood penalty
- Productivity-pay gap
- Wage theft
