= Casey Fiesler =

American social computing researcher and professor

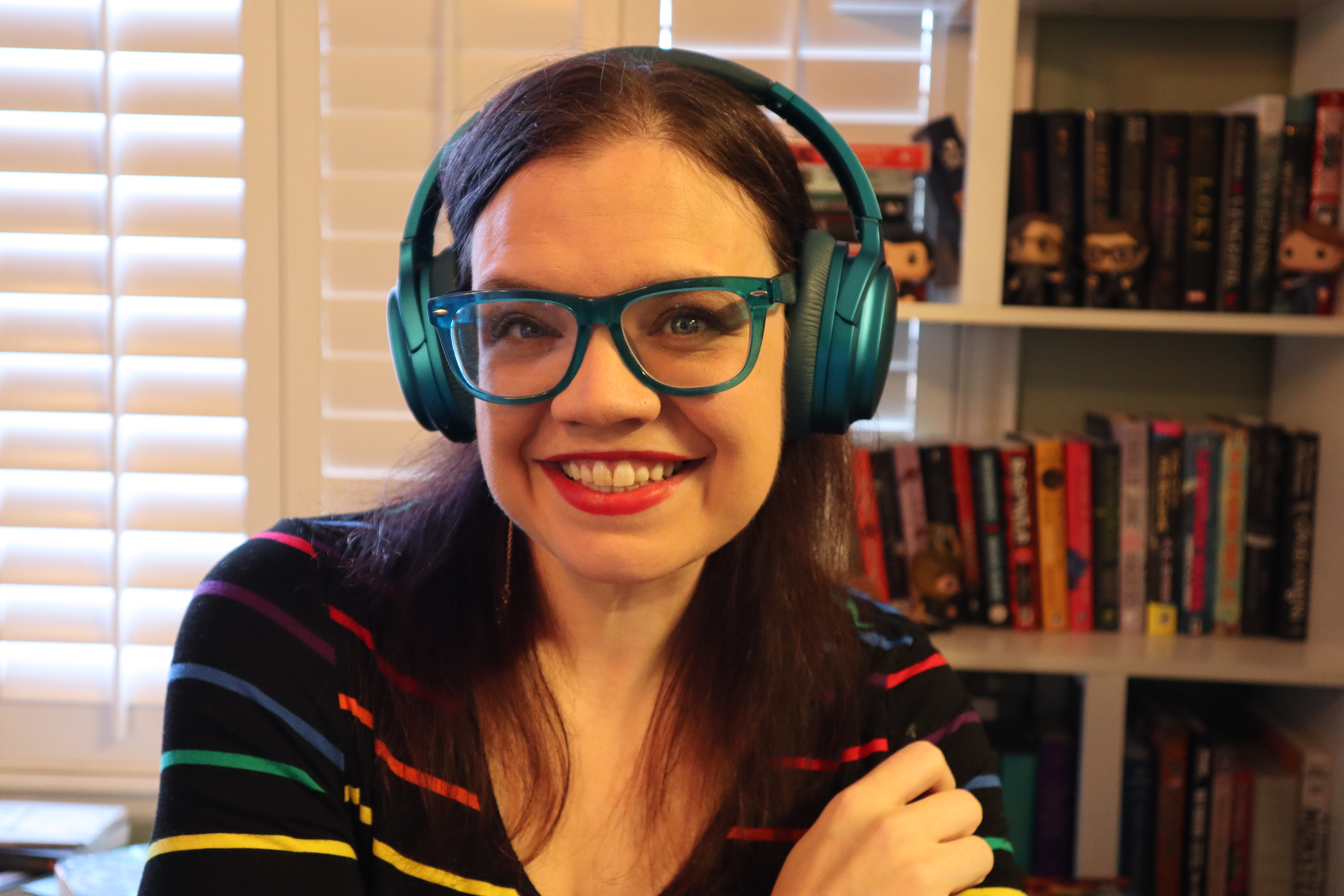

Academic background
- Education: Georgia Institute of Technology (PhD) Vanderbilt University (JD)
- Doctoral advisor: Amy S. Bruckman

Academic work
- Institutions: University of Colorado Boulder
- Website: https://caseyfiesler.com

Casey Fiesler is an American associate professor at University of Colorado Boulder who studies technology ethics, internet law and policy, and online communities.

== Career ==
Fiesler graduated from Georgia Tech with a PhD in Human-Centered Computing and a Juris Doctor from Vanderbilt University. While at Georgia Tech, Fiesler helped research into AO3, as a model of healthy online communities for women and other minorities. She is among the founding members of the CU Boulder Information Science Department. Fiesler is also known for her public communication work on TikTok around algorithmic justice, social media platforms and their policies, and ethical considerations in technology. She has spoken about toxicity, parasocial interactions, and other topics, especially surrounding social media trends. Her TikToks have also covered IP and patent law in the context of social media and artificial intelligence.

Fiesler received a grant in 2017 to research the ethics of social media studies, such as analyzing user's posts en masse without their permission (i.e. determining sexual orientation with facial recognition tools). She has also researched social media migration, such as when users moved from LiveJournal to Tumblr.

In 2014, Fiesler went viral by calling out the introduction of a Computer Engineer Barbie as misogynistic due to the accompanying story and suggested her own story. Fiesler later provided expertise to Mattel during the development of new STEM-focused Barbies.

Fiesler has Type 1 diabetes. She has advocated for and helped research in relation to technology and diabetes, especially around insulin pump technology.
