= Wage premium =

A wage premium is the extent to which the wages of members of a certain group exceed the wages of those outside the group.

Wage premium may also refer to:

- College wage premium
- Lesbian wage premium
- Union wage premium

== See also ==
- Pay gap
