= Gender gap =

A gender gap is a relative disparity between people of different genders. It's reflected in a variety of sectors in many societies. There exist differences between men and women as reflected in social, political, intellectual, cultural, scientific, and economic attainments or attitudes.

Examples include:

- Gender pay gap, the average difference between the remuneration for men and women who are working, with women often paid less than men
  - Gender pay gap in Australia, a persistent and sometimes rising gender pay gap in Australia
  - Gender pay gap in India, difference in earnings between women and men in the paid employment and labor market in India
  - Gender pay gap in New Zealand, the difference in the median hourly wages of men and women in New Zealand
  - Gender pay gap in Russia, occupational segregation by gender and labor market discrimination in Russia, especially since 1991
  - Gender pay gap in the United States, ratio of female-to-male median or average earnings among full-time workers in the US
    - Gender pay gap in the United States tech industry, divergence in pay between men and women who work in areas such as software engineering
  - Gender pay gap in sports, unequal pay in sports, particularly for female athletes who do not receive equal revenue, depending on the sport
- Gender gap in Pakistan, relative disparity between male and female citizens in Pakistan in terms of legal discrimination, economic inequality, and cultural attitudes
- Gender gap in education, sex discrimination in the education system affecting both men and women during and after their educational experiences
  - Gender gaps in mathematics and reading, the finding that on average boys and men exceed in mathematics, while girls and women exceed in reading skills
- Gender differences in suicide, different rates of completed suicides and suicidal behavior; women more often have suicidal thoughts, but men commit suicide more frequently
- Wikipedia gender gap, the fact that Wikipedia contributors are mostly male, relatively few biographies are about women, and topics of interest to women are less well-covered
- Voting gender gap in the United States, the difference in the percentage of men and women voting for a particular candidate in US elections
- Orgasm gap, a social phenomenon referring to the general disparity between heterosexual men and women in terms of sexual satisfaction
- Digital Gender Gaps, such as a gender rating gap in online reviews, where women's average submitted star rating is higher than men's.
- Gender gap (linguistics)

== See also ==
- BBC gender pay gap controversy, a series of incidents in 2017 and 2018 revealing a gender pay gap at the British Broadcasting Corporation
- Gender binary, the classification of gender into two distinct forms, whether by social system or cultural belief
- Gender inequality, the social process by which men and women are not treated as equals
- Gender pension gap, the cumulative impact of the gender pay gap.
- Global Gender Gap Report, an index, published by the World Economic Forum, designed to measure gender equality
- Sex ratio, the ratio of males to females in a population
- Missing women, the situation of having fewer women than expected in a population

=== External links ===
- Ford, H., & Wajcman, J. (2017). ‘Anyone can edit’, not everyone does: Wikipedia’s infrastructure and the gender gap. Social Studies of Science, 47(4), 511-527. https://doi.org/10.1177/0306312717692172
