= Susan Shapiro Barash =

American author (born 1954)

- Born: New York, New York
- Education: Sarah Lawrence College (B.A.), New York University (Master of Arts in Creative Writing and Literature)
- Website: susanshapirobarash.com

Susan Shapiro Barash is an American fiction and nonfiction author. She writes fiction under her pen name Susannah Marren. Her novels include A Palm Beach Wife, and A Palm Beach Scandal and Maribelle's Shadow. Her nonfiction titles includes Tripping the Prom Queen: The Truth about Women and Rivalry, The Nine Phases of Marriage, and Little White Lies, Deep Dark Secrets: The Truth about Why Women Lie.

== Career ==
Barash's books focus on the gender divide, how women are positioned in American society and their feelings about themselves in different roles

Barash has been featured in The Wall Street Journal, The New York Post, New York Magazine, Elle, and many other publications. She has appeared on national television including The Today Show, CBS, CNN, and MSNBC. Barash has been a guest on NPR and Sirius Radio and speaking appearances include Credit Suisse, Bayer Diagnostics, UBS, United Way, Kravis Center for the Arts and the Society of the Four Arts. Several of her titles have been optioned by Lifetime and HBO.

For over two decades Barash has taught in the Writing Department at Marymount Manhattan College. She has guest taught at the Writing Institute at Sarah Lawrence College and has served as a literary panelist for the New York State Council on the Arts. Barash has also been a judge for the International Emmys and Vice Chair of the Mentoring Committee of the Women's Leadership Board at the JFK School of Government, Harvard.

== Books ==
=== Fiction ===
- Between the Tides, St. Martin's Press (July 2015) ISBN 978-1250066732
- A Palm Beach Wife, St. Martin's Griffin (April 2019) ISBN 978-1250198402
- A Palm Beach Scandal, Griffin (September 2020) ISBN 978-1250228086
- Maribelle’s Shadow, Beaufort Books (June 2023) ISBN 978-0825310294

=== Non-Fiction ===
- A Passion for More: Affairs That Make or Break Us (Updated & Revised Edition), Meridian Editions (October 2022) ISBN 978-1959170013
- The Nine Phases of Marriage, Griffin (September 2012) ISBN 978-0312642198
- You're Grounded Forever… But First Let's Go Shopping, St. Martin's Griffin (September 2010) ISBN 978-0312614225
- Toxic Friends, St. Martin's Press (October 2009) ISBN 978-0312386399
- Little White Lies, Deep Dark Secrets, St. Martin's Press (March 2008) ISBN 978-0312364458
- Tripping the Prom Queen: The Truth About Women and Rivalry, St. Martin's Press (May 2006) ISBN 978-0312342319
- The New Wife: The Evolving Role of the American Wife, Nonetheless Pr (February 2004) ISBN 978-1932053081
- A Passion for More, Berkeley Hills Books (February 1993/reissue September 2003) ISBN 978-1893163249
- Women of Divorce: Mothers, Daughters, Stepmothers - The New Triangle, New Horizon Press (November 2002) ISBN 978-0882822228
- Mothers-in-Law and Daughters-In-Law: Love, Hate, Rivalry and Reconciliation, New Horizon Press (May 2001) ISBN 978-0882822068
- Reclaiming Ourselves: How Women Dispel a Legacy of Bad Choices, Berkeley Hills Books (December 2001) ISBN 978-1893163294
- Sisters: Devoted or Divided, Replica Books (1994/ reissue March 2001) ISBN 978-0735104846
- Second Wives: The Pitfalls and Rewards of Marrying Widowers and Divorced Men, New Horizon Press (May 2000) ISBN 978-0882821825
