= Computer Engineer Barbie =

126th career version of Mattel's Barbie doll

Computer Engineer Barbie in its packaging

Computer Engineer Barbie is the 126th career version of Mattel's Barbie doll. In response to poll results indicating strong support for computer engineers, the doll set was created and introduced in 2010. In 2014, Mattel apologized for the accompanying book, I Can Be a Computer Engineer, after complaints that it represented Barbie as incompetent in the field, needing the help of men.

== Description ==
The doll has a pink laptop and a pink smartphone, and is wearing geometric pink glasses, a pink watch, black leggings, a T-shirt decorated with "Barbie" spelled in binary code, a fitted vest with saddle-stitch detailing, pink wedges, and a Bluetooth headset. The packaging included a code to unlock exclusive game content on the Barbie website. Female engineers including Betty Shanahan, CEO of the Society of Women Engineers, and Alice Agogino of the National Academy of Engineering were consulted on her wardrobe and work environment. They suggested that for authenticity she needed "a Coke can and a bag of Doritos" on her desk; she has a coffee cup. One mockup also included a Linux penguin; Barbie is running Linux on her dual-monitor set-up.

== History ==
In 2010, Mattel invited people to vote for Barbie's 126th career, the first instance of this in the company's history. Voters were able to choose between five choices: computer engineer, architect, environmentalist, news anchor, and surgeon. Although girls preferred news anchor, computer engineer was the most popular choice in online polling, partly because of promotion by the Society of Women Engineers. The two dolls were launched together at the 2010 American International Toy Fair.

== Reception ==
Many writers for tech publications and other reviewers were encouraged by the choice of career, hoping it would encourage girls to consider careers in computer science. However, the amount of pink, the hairstyle, and the stylish clothes struck some women as unrealistic and stereotyped.

The accompanying book, I Can Be a Computer Engineer, was issued in 2013 together with I Can Be an Actress. The book received extensive criticism, especially beginning in November 2014, for depicting Barbie as relying on two male friends to program the game she is designing. In addition, they need to help her after she accidentally infects her and her sister Skipper's computer with a virus (via the pink heart-shaped USB stick she wears around her neck), after ignoring advice from her (female) computer teacher.

A website was created to enable people to replace segments of the book's text with their own, and Mattel pulled the title from Amazon after many critical reviews. The publisher stated it was being discontinued. A Mattel spokesperson said that the book had first been published in 2010 and was outdated, and the company apologized. The book's Barbie says she's "only creating the design ideas" and that her two male friends will have to do the coding; the author, who proclaimed herself a feminist, said her assignment had been to portray Barbie as a designer and "regrets that she may have let stereotypes slip into the book".

In response to the complaints of the book, Mattel posted an apology on their official Facebook page for Barbie, stating that the "portrayal of Barbie in this specific story doesn't reflect the Brand's vision for what Barbie stands for."
