= Beyond Bias and Barriers =

2006 report from the US National Academy of Sciences

Beyond Bias and Barriers: Fulfilling the Potential of Women in Academic Science and Engineering (ISBN 0309100429) is a major report about the status of women in science from the United States National Academy of Sciences. Published in 2006, the report closely examines the data, proposed explanations, and possible responses to the relative dearth of women in science and engineering higher education in the United States.

== History ==
The report was written by the "Committee on Maximizing the Potential of Women in Academic Science and Engineering", a panel at the National Academy of Sciences. The committee was chaired by Donna Shalala, and included college presidents, provosts, professors, scientists, and policy analysts. Committee members included: Alice M. Agogino, Lotte Bailyn, Robert J. Birgeneau, Ana Mari Cauce, Catherine D. DeAngelis, Denice Denton (who committed suicide before the release of the report), Barbara Grosz, Jo Handeslman, Nan Keohane, Shirley Malcom, Geraldine Richmond, Alice M. Rivlin, Ruth Simmons, Elizabeth Spelke, Joan Steitz, Elaine Weyuker, and Maria T. Zuber.

As is typical with NAS reports, after the Committee drafted the report, it underwent a peer review process within the NAS, in this case reviewed by another Committee of nineteen members.

== Conclusions ==
The report first notes and documents significant gender gaps throughout the academic pipeline in the sciences, finding that the numbers of women in the sciences decrease "at every educational transition" from high school through fully tenured faculty positions. For instance, over the past 30 years women have earned more than 30% of the doctorates in the social and behavioral sciences and more than 20% in the life sciences; but they hold only 15% of the full professorships in those fields. Minority women are "all but absent from professorships".

The report then goes on to review ideas about the sources of the gender gaps, ultimately finding that the problem is "unconscious but pervasive bias", "arbitrary and subjective" evaluation processes, and a historic system which bases childrearing and family responsibilities on the concept of a professional spouse with a stay-at-home "wife". Specifically the report found significant evidence of bias: women are paid less, promoted more slowly, receive fewer honors, and hold fewer leadership positions. Although progress has been made in some areas—women are nearly at gender parity with men in entering graduate school in biology; when women are considered for initial promotion to associate professor they succeed at the same rates as men—there are still significant gaps.

The report found that widespread ideas about women's and men's differences were largely irrelevant, including theories advanced such as cognitive abilities or preferences, career aspirations and ambition, or productivity and work ethic issues.

Finally, the report reviews a number of potential solutions and makes a variety of recommendations to level the playing field and "stop the leaks" in the leaky pipeline. These steps include~~ Different types of reform that will help mitigate eliminate biases. National Academy of Sciences

- alteration of academic procedures for hiring and evaluation ("promotion and tenure"), at the institutional level;
- additional support for working parents at the institutional level;
- efforts across the field to monitor hiring practices
- efforts to institute blind-review in peer review processes to eliminate gender bias;

and other efforts.

== Reception and influence ==
The report was widely well-received, received significant media coverage, and sparked a number of institutional-level meetings in the months after its release. In general its even-handed and data-rich approach was lauded, although John Tierney, a New York Times opinion columnist, suggested that the report must have been biased because its committee was largely made up of women. In response, Donna Shalala denied that the gender of the scientists biased their scientific findings, and pointed out that while the committee itself was largely made up of women, the committee's work was peer-reviewed by a National Academy of Sciences committee of 19 that included 10 men.

A number of educational institutions held meetings or established committees to implement recommendations from the report, including Harvard University, M.I.T., University of Texas, Iowa State University, University of Wisconsin–Madison, Boston University, Stanford University, and the National Science Foundation,

The American Council on Education (ACE), a higher education umbrella organization, took the recommendation from the report to monitor hiring practices, and agreed to convene its member organizations to examine ways to do so. The American Association for the Advancement of Science (AAAS) also convened a meeting at its annual conference.

Critics have pointed out that in comparing the representation of women in the hiring pool (recent PhD recipients) versus among recent hires (assistant professors), approximations were used as mentioned in Notes on page 17 of the report; these overestimated both the representation and the utilization of women. One was taking the representation of women among professors from the Survey of Earned Doctorates; as noted in the report, this ignored all professors who received their PhDs abroad. Also data from the Survey of Earned Doctorates represent samples of those surveyed. A third approximation is introduced by combining disciplines which show opposite trends in the utilization of their hiring pools, such as chemistry and chemical engineering. More accurate data and comparisons are available from the Nelson Diversity Surveys (Table 11), which give more accurate comparisons by including all professors regardless of national origin, by getting populations instead of samples, and by treating the disciplines separately.

== See also ==
- Association for Women in Science (AWIS)
- Women in science
- Women in medicine
- United States National Academy of Sciences

== Further research ==
- Powerpoint presentation used for NAS press conference
