= Barbie's careers =

List of portrayed Barbie fashion doll careers

Since Barbie's introduction as a teenage fashion model in 1959, the doll has been portrayed with many careers. Dolls are sold with sets of clothes and accessories that fit the career being portrayed. For example, the Lifeguard Barbie playset includes a Barbie, an outfit with shoes, a lifeguard chair, a dolphin, and a life preserver, while the Spanish Teacher Barbie includes a Barbie, an outfit with shoes, flashcards, a Spanish quiz, an easel, a notebook, a key chain, and a hairbrush.

According to Mattel, Barbie has had over 250 careers, recently including more STEM fields.

== By category ==
=== Arts, media, and entertainment ===
- Actress (1977, re-released 2008 and 2022; Western Star 1980, 1988, Silver Screen 1994, 1999, Between Takes 2000, 2001, Hooray for Hollywood 2002, 2003, 2004, 2009, 2010, 2012, 2013, 2024)
- Artist (2008, 2012, 2018, 2022)
- Cake baker (2014, 2019)
- Chef (clothing pack 1991, clothing pack 1995, clothing pack 1996, 2010, 2019, 2020, clothing pack 2022)
  - Bakery chef (2018, 2021)
  - Cookie chef (2014)
  - Cupcake chef (2015)
  - Dessert chef (2013)
  - Pancake chef (2012)
  - Pasta chef (2021)
  - Pastry chef (clothing pack 2014, 2023)
  - Pizza chef (2009, 2026)
  - Smoothie chef (2016)
  - Spaghetti chef (2017)
  - Sweet chef (2013)
  - TV chef (2009)
- Cinematographer (2024)
- Circus performer (1995, 2010)
- Dancer (2011)
  - Ballerina (1961, 1976, 1984, clothing pack 1995, 2006, 2009, 2010, 2012, 2014, 2015, 2024)
  - Ballroom dancer (1991, 2014, 2025)
  - Cabaret dancer (2007)
  - Can-can dancer (2009, 2011)
  - Rockette (1992)
  - Showgirl (2008)
- Dolphin trainer (2013)
- Drum majorette (1964, 2002)
- Fashion designer (1960, re-released 1995; clothing pack 1992, 2001, 2002, 2012, clothing pack 2015, 2022)
- Fashion editor (1965, 2000)
- Fashion model (1959, Fashion Model Collection 2000–2020, Top Model 2008, I can be... Fashion Model 2012, 2022)
- Fashion trend forecaster (1999)
- Film director (2015, 2024)
- Film producer (2005)
- Floral designer (2012)
- Game show host (1987)
- Gamer (2026)
- Interior designer (2022)
- Magician (2013)
- Make-up artist (Barbie loves MAC 2007, I can be... Makeup Artist 2013, 2022)
- Musician (2017, 2019, clothing pack 2020, clothing pack 2022)
  - Bard (2004)
  - Keyboardist (2021)
  - Lutist (Japan-exclusive Barbie Styled by Yuming 2000)
  - Pianist (playset 1989)
  - Rock star/guitarist (1986, Barbie and the Beat 1989, 1998, 1999, 2010, 2013, 2015, 2021, 2025)
  - Saxophonist (clothing pack 2018)
  - Violinist (2013, clothing pack 2021, 2023)
- Music producer (2021)
- News anchor (2010, 2019)
- Photographer
  - Baby photographer (2008)
  - Fashion photographer (2012)
  - Pet photographer (2022)
- Photojournalist (2019, collaboration with National Geographic)
- Singer (Solo in the Spotlight 1960, re-released 1990 and 1995; Barbie and the Rockers 1986, Japan-exclusive 1987, Barbie and the Sensations 1988, Bandstand Beauty 1996, 2002, 2013, 2023)
  - Rapper (1992)
  - Country Western singer (Country Western Star 1994, Country Rose 1997, Rising Star 1998, 1999)
  - Jazz singer (2007)
  - Lounge singer (2006)
  - Pop singer (Pop Sensation 2002, Pop Icon 2010, Pop Star 2019, Pop Star 2023, 65th Anniversary Careers 2024)
- SeaWorld trainer (2009, 2013)
- Sports reporter (2023)
- Stylist (2023)
  - Hair stylist (2014, 2015, 2021)
  - Wardrobe stylist (2023)
- Tour manager (2025)
- TV news camerawoman (2018)

=== Business ===
- Avon representative (1999)
- Babysitter (accessories only 1963, accessories only 1976, 2010, 2013, 2014, 2015)
- Bake shop worker (Japan-exclusive 1998, 2006)
- Beach snack stand worker (playset 1992, playset 2021)
- Business executive (Career Girl 1963, re-released 2006; Day to Night 1985, re-released 2018; 1992, Working Woman 1999, clothing pack 2020, Barbie Rewind Career Girl 2021)
- Café worker (playset 1998)
- Candy and ice cream parlor worker (1988)
- Cashier
  - McDonald's cashier (playset 1982, playset 1994, 2001)
  - Pizza Hut cashier (playset 2001)
  - See's Candies cashier (1999)
  - Supermarket cashier (playset 1992)
- Chief Sustainability Officer (2022)
- Coffee shop worker (2020, 2024)
- Crepe shop worker (Japan-exclusive 1987)
- Department store worker
  - Makeup department worker (playset only 1982)
  - Fashion department worker (playset only 1982)
- Dog daycare owner (2019)
- Donut shop owner (2026)
- Entrepreneur (2014)
- Farmer (2018, playset 2020, 2022, 2024)
  - Chicken farmer (2019)
- Farmer's market stall owner (2022)
- Fashion boutique owner (2023)
- Film studio executive (2024)
- Florist (1999, 2021)
- Food truck operator (2020)
- Grocery store worker (2018)
- Ice cream cart owner (1987)
- Ice cream shop worker (1989, playset 1998, 2022)
- Mary Kay consultant (2003)
- Noodle bar worker (2020)
- Outdoor beauty store worker (Canada-exclusive 1999, 2002)
- Palmer's clothing store employee (Austria-exclusive 1996)
- Pet boutique owner (2008)
- Pet groomer (playset 1994, 2013, clothing pack 2020)
- Restaurant owner (Japan-exclusive 1990, 2021)
- Shopkeeper (Pioneer Shopkeeper 1996)
- Secretary (2007)
- Smoothie bar worker (2021)
- Waitress (2006, clothing pack 2012, 2017)
  - Soda fountain waitress (Coca Cola Series 1998)

=== Education ===
- Art teacher (2002, 2007, 2011, clothing pack 2013, 2020)
- Ballet teacher (2007, 2010, 2017)
- Cooking teacher (2010)
- English language teacher (2017)
- Math teacher (2023)
- Music teacher (clothing pack 2012, 2014, 2019)
- School teacher (India-exclusive 1991, clothing pack 1993, 2006, My Favorite Career 2010, 2019, clothing pack 2021)
  - Elementary school teacher (1995, 1997, 2000, 2007, 2008, 2010, 2011, 2012, 2013, 2015, 2018, 2022)
  - Preschool teacher (playset 1997, 2009, I can be... Nursery School Teacher 2012, 2024, 2025)
- Science teacher (2021)
- Sign language teacher (1999)
- Spanish language teacher (2000)
- Student teacher (1965, re-issued 2009)
- Yoga teacher (2012)

=== Medicine ===
- Animal rescuer (2016, 2024)
  - Arctic animal rescuer (2012)
  - Marine wildlife rescuer (2013)
  - Panda rescuer (2022)
- Art therapist (2024)
- Candy striper (clothing pack 1964)
- Dentist (1997, 2003, 2010, 2015, 2019, 2023, 2024, 2025)
- Doctor (1988, 1993, Spain-exclusive José Carreras Doctora Barbie 1995, 1996, 2010, 2012, 2013, 2015, 2019, 2020, 2021, 2025)
- Eye doctor (2015, 2017)
- Nurse (1961, re-issued 2009. Civil War Nurse 1995, 2006, My Favorite Career 2010, clothing pack 2011, 2012, 2014, clothing pack 2015, 2017)
- Paramedic (2021)
- Pediatrician (1995, playset 1996, Children's Doctor 2000, Baby Doctor 2001, Happy Family Baby Doctor 2003, Play All Day Baby Doctor 2006, I can be... Baby Doctor 2008, I can be... Kid Doctor 2010, I can be... Pediatric Doctor 2011, 2013, 2015, 2016, 2020, 2024, 2025)
- Surgeon (1973, re-released 2021)
- Veterinarian (1985, Brazil-exclusive 1992, clothing pack 1993, Pet Doctor 1996, Pet Doctor 2005, I can be... Pet Vet 2012, 2021, 2025)
  - Horse veterinarian (I can be... Pony Doctor 2010)
  - Livestock veterinarian (Farm Vet 2016, Livestock Veterinarian 2023, 65th Anniversary Careers 2024)
  - Panda veterinarian (Panda Caretaker 2014)
  - Zoo veterinarian (Play All Day Zoo Doctor 2006, I can be... Zoo Doctor 2008, Zoo Doctor 2015)

=== Military ===
- Army medic (1993)
- Paratrooper (2000)
- United States Air Force pilot (1991, 2001)
- United States Air Force Thunderbirds pilot (1993)
- United States Army officer (1989, Desert Storm 1992)
- United States Marine Corps sergeant (1991)
- United States Navy petty officer QM1 (1991)

=== Political ===
- Campaign fundraiser (2020)
- Campaign manager (2020)
- President (1992, 2023)
- UNICEF Ambassador (1989)
- United States presidential candidate (2000, 2004, 2008, 2012, 2016, 2024)
- Vice presidential candidate (2016)

=== Public service ===
- Canadian Mountie (1987, 2013)
- Detective (1999, 2014)
- Firefighter (clothing pack 1993, 1995, clothing pack 2011, 2015, 2021, 2024)
- Judge (2019)
- Lifeguard (Baywatch 1994, 2011, clothing pack 2014, 2015, 2021, 2023)
- Park ranger (2020)
- Police officer (1993, clothing pack 2011)

=== Science and engineering ===
- Architect (2010)
- Astronaut (1965, re-released 2025; 1985, 1994, clothing pack 1997, My Favorite Career 2010, clothing pack 2012, I can be... Mars Explorer 2013, clothing pack 2014, 2017, 2021, 2023, 65th Anniversary Careers 2024)
- Astrophysicist (2019, collaboration with National Geographic)
- Biologist (2022)
  - Entomologist (2019, collaboration with National Geographic)
  - Marine biologist (clothing pack 2012, 2022)
    - Polar marine biologist (2019, collaboration with National Geographic)
  - Zoologist (2021)
- Biochemist (2024)
- Computer engineer (Computer Engineer Barbie, 2010), (accompanying book pulled by Mattel in 2014)
- Conservation scientist (2022)
- Game developer (2016)
- Renewable energy engineer (2022)
- Robotics engineer (2018, 2026)
- Paleontologist (1996, 2012, 2026)
- Scientist (2018, 2026)
- Space scientist (2017)
- Wildlife conservationist (2019, collaboration with National Geographic)

=== Sports and athletics ===
- Aerobics instructor (1984)
- Association football (soccer) player (1998, Italy-exclusive A.C. Milan/Inter Milan 1999, 2011, 2013, 2014, 2015, 2022, 2023, Team USA 2026)
- Baseball player (1993, 2018)
  - Major League Baseball player (1998)
- Basketball player (2018, 2024)
  - National Basketball Association player (1998)
  - Women's National Basketball Association player (1998)
- Bowler (2000)
- Boxer (2020, 2024)
- Cheerleader (1963, clothing pack 1964, clothing pack 1992, Coca-Cola Cheerleader 2000, Pom Pom Divas 2006, Dallas Cowboys Cheerleader Barbie 2007, 2010, clothing pack 2011, 2013, 2014, 2024)
- Coach (2023)
  - Association football (soccer) coach (2019)
  - Figure skating coach (2019)
  - Gymnastics coach (2009, 2013, 2016, 2019)
  - Tennis coach (2017)
  - Volleyball coach (2017)
- Equestrienne (1976, clothing pack 2010, 2012)
- Figure skater (1990, 1996, 2000, clothing pack 2011, 2012, clothing pack 2014, 2015, clothing pack 2021, 2022, 2023, 2025, 2026)
- General manager (2023)
- Golfer (clothing pack 2018, 2024)
- Gymnast (1993, clothing pack 2011, 2012, 2015, 2020, 2023)
  - Rhythmic gymnast (2017, 2021)
- Hockey player (Tim Hortons 2020, 2021, Tim Hortons x PWHL 2025)
- Martial artist (clothing pack 2012, 2017)
- Matador (1999)
- Olympic athlete
  - Olympic climber (2020)
  - Olympic figure skater (1975, 1988, 1997, 2002)
  - Olympic gymnast (1974, 1995)
  - Olympic karate (2020)
  - Olympic skateboarder (2020)
  - Olympic skier (1975)
  - Olympic softball player (2020)
  - Olympic surfer (2020)
  - Olympic swimmer (1975, re-released 2021; Australia-exclusive 1977, 2000)
- Race car driver (2010, 2026)
  - Formula One driver (Scuderia Ferrari 2000)
  - NASCAR driver (1998, 1999)
- Referee (2023)
- Scuba diver (1994)
- Skateboarder (2017)
- Skier (2011, 2012)
  - Para alpine skier (2022)
- Snowboarder (2012, 2022, 2025)
- Swimmer (2012, 2019, 2023)
- Swim teacher (2008)
- Tennis player (1962, 1971, European Sports Star 1979, 1986, clothing pack 1997, 2012, 2014, 2020, 2022, 2023)
- Track-and-field runner (2012)
- Volleyball player (2020, 2023)

=== Transportation ===
- Aircraft engineer (2019)
- Carriage driver (1998)
- Flight attendant (American Airlines 1961–64, Pan Am 1966, United Airlines clothing pack 1973, Japan-exclusive Japan Airlines 1997, 2006, My Favorite Career 2010, clothing pack 2011, 2012, Virgin Atlantic 2019, 2025)
- Pilot (Flight Time 1989, India-exclusive Flight Time 1995, 1997, Airline Pilot 1999, clothing pack 2011, 2012, 2014, 2015, 2019, clothing pack 2021, 2022, 2025)
- Tour guide (Toy Story 2 Tour Guide Special Edition 1999)
  - African safari guide (clothing pack 1995)
  - Wilderness guide (2021)
- Train conductor (Travel Train Fun 2001)
- Train hostess (Travel Train Fun 2001)
- Travel agent (playset 1986)

=== Other roles ===
- Bee keeper (2018)
- Cat burglar (Barbie by Christian Louboutin 2009)
- Construction worker (clothing pack 2020)
- Cowgirl (1997, 2004)
- Jillaroo (1993)
- Maid (Japan-exclusive 1987, 2006)
- Ocean treasure explorer (2013)
- Spy (Mystery Squad 2002, Spy Squad 2015)
- Starfleet engineering officer (1996)
- Superhero (Flying Hero 1995)
- Usher (2007)
- Wild animal trainer (clothing pack 2010)
- Zookeeper (2013)

== By year ==
Year	#	Careers
1959	1	Fashion model
1960	2	Fashion designer, singer
1961	3	Ballerina, flight attendant, nurse
1962	0	
1963	3	Babysitter (accessories only), business executive, cheerleader
1964	3	Cheerleader (clothing pack only), candy striper (clothing pack only), drum majorette
1965	3	Astronaut, fashion editor, student teacher
1966	1	Flight attendant
1967	0	
1968	0	
1969	0	
1970	0	
1971	0	
1972	0	
1973	2	Flight attendant (clothing pack only), surgeon
1974	1	Olympic gymnast
1975	3	Olympic figure skater, Olympic skier, Olympic swimmer
1976	3	Ballerina, babysitter (accessories only), equestrian
1977	2	Actress, Olympic swimmer
1978	0	
1979	1	Tennis player
1980	1	Actress
1981	0	
1982	3	McDonald's cashier (playset), makeup department worker (playset), fashion department worker (playset)
1983	0	
1984	2	Aerobics instructor, ballerina
1985	3	Astronaut, business executive, veterinarian
1986	3	Rock star, singer, travel agent (playset)
1987	6	Canadian Mountie, crepe shop worker, game show host (playset), ice cream cart owner, maid, singer
1988	5	Actress, candy and ice cream parlor worker, doctor, Olympic figure skater, singer
1989	6	Ice cream shop worker, pianist, pilot, rock star, United States Army officer, UNICEF Ambassador
1990	3	Figure skater, restaurant owner, singer
1991	6	Ballroom dancer, chef (clothing pack only), school teacher, United States Air Force pilot, United States Marine Corps sergeant, United States Navy petty officer QM1
1992	10	Beach snack stand worker (playset), business executive, cheerleader, fashion designer (clothing pack only), rapper, Rockette, supermarket cashier (playset), United States Army officer, United States presidential candidate, veterinarian
1993	10	Army medic, baseball player, doctor, firefighter (clothing pack only), gymnast, jillaroo, police officer, school teacher (clothing pack only), United States Air Force Thunderbirds pilot, veterinarian (clothing pack only)
1994	7	Actress, astronaut, Country Western singer, lifeguard, McDonald's cashier (playset), pet groomer (playset), scuba diver
1995	14	African safari guide (clothing pack only), ballerina (clothing pack only), chef (clothing pack only), circus performer, doctor, elementary school teacher, fashion designer, firefighter, nurse, Olympic gymnast, pediatrician, pilot, singer, superhero
1996	9	Chef (clothing pack only), doctor, figure skater, paleontologist, Palmer's clothing store employee, pediatrician (playset), shopkeeper, singer, Starfleet security officer
1997	10	Astronaut (clothing pack only), Country Western singer, cowgirl, dentist, elementary school teacher, Japan Airlines flight attendant, Olympic figure skater, pilot, preschool teacher (playset), tennis player (clothing pack only)
1998	11	Association football (soccer) player, bake shop worker, carriage driver, Country Western singer, ice cream shop worker (playset), MLB player, NASCAR driver, NBA player, rock star, soda fountain waitress, WNBA player
1999	16	Actress, association football (soccer) player, Avon representative, business executive, Country Western singer, detective, fashion trend forecaster, florist, matador, NASCAR driver, outdoor beauty store worker, pilot, rock star, See's Candies cashier, sign language teacher, tour guide
2000	13	Actress, bowler, cheerleader, elementary school teacher, fashion editor, fashion model, figure skater, Formula One driver, lute player, Olympic swimmer, pediatrician, Spanish language teacher, United States presidential candidate
2001	9	Actress, fashion designer, fashion model, McDonald's cashier, pediatrician, Pizza Hut cashier (playset), train conductor, train hostess, United States Air Force pilot
2002	10	Actress, art teacher, drum majorette, fashion designer, fashion model, Olympic figure skater, outdoor beauty store worker, pop singer, singer, spy
2003	4	Actress, dentist, fashion model, pediatrician
2004	5	Actress, bard, cowgirl, fashion model, United States presidential candidate
2005	3	Fashion model, film producer, veterinarian
2006	13	Ballerina, bake shop worker, business executive, cheerleader, fashion model, flight attendant, lounge singer, maid, nurse, pediatrician, school teacher, veterinarian, waitress
2007	10	Art teacher, ballet teacher, cabaret dancer, cheerleader, elementary school teacher, fashion model, jazz singer, make-up artist, secretary, usher
2008	11	Actress, artist, baby photographer, elementary school teacher, fashion model, pediatrician, pet boutique owner, showgirl, swim teacher, United States presidential candidate, veterinarian
2009	12	Actress, ballerina, can-can dancer, cat burglar, fashion model, gymnastics coach, nurse, pizza chef, preschool teacher, SeaWorld trainer, student teacher, TV chef
2010	26	Actress, architect, astronaut, babysitter, ballerina, ballet teacher, cheerleader, chef, circus performer, computer engineer, cooking teacher, dentist, doctor, elementary school teacher, equestrian (clothing pack only), fashion model, flight attendant, pediatrician, pop singer, news anchor, nurse, race car driver, rock star, school teacher, veterinarian, wild animal trainer (clothing pack only)
2011	17	Art teacher, association football (soccer) player, can-can dancer, cheerleader (clothing pack only), dancer, elementary school teacher, fashion model, figure skater (clothing pack only), firefighter (clothing pack only), flight attendant (clothing pack only), gymnast (clothing pack only), lifeguard, nurse, pediatrician, pilot (clothing pack only), police officer (clothing pack only), skier
2012	31	Actress, arctic animal rescuer, artist, astronaut (clothing pack only), ballerina, doctor, equestrienne, fashion designer, fashion model, fashion photographer, figure skater, flight attendant, floral designer, gymnast, marine biologist (clothing pack only), martial artist (clothing pack only), music teacher (clothing pack only), nurse, paleontologist, pancake chef, pilot, preschool teacher, skier, snowboarder, swimmer, tennis player, track-and-field runner, United States presidential candidate, veterinarian, waiter (clothing pack only), yoga teacher
2013	22	Actress, art teacher (clothing pack only), association football (soccer) player, astronaut, babysitter, Canadian Mountie, cheerleader, dessert chef, doctor, dolphin trainer, elementary school teacher, SeaWorld trainer, fashion model, gymnastics coach, make-up artist, marine wildlife rescuer, pediatrician, pet groomer, rock star, singer, sweet chef, violinist
2014	20	Association football (soccer) player, astronaut (clothing pack only), babysitter, ballerina, ballroom dancer, cake baker, cheerleader, cookie chef, detective, entrepreneur, fashion model, figure skater (clothing pack only), hair stylist, lifeguard (clothing pack only), music teacher, nurse, pastry chef (clothing pack only), pilot, tennis player, veterinarian
2015	22	Association football (soccer) player, babysitter, ballerina, cupcake chef, dentist, doctor, eye doctor, elementary school teacher, fashion designer (clothing pack only), fashion model, figure skater, film director, firefighter, gymnast, hair stylist, lifeguard, nurse (clothing pack only), pediatrician, pilot, rock star, spy, veterinarian
2016	9	Animal rescuer, fashion model, game developer, gymnastics coach, pediatrician, smoothie chef, United States presidential candidate, United States vice presidential candidate, veterinarian
2017	14	Astronaut, ballet teacher, English language teacher, eye doctor, fashion model, martial artist, musician, nurse, rhythmic gymnast, skateboarder, space scientist, spaghetti chef, tennis coach, waiter
2018	15	Artist, bakery chef, baseball player, basketball player, bee keeper, business executive, chemist, elementary school teacher, farmer, fashion model, golfer (clothing pack only), grocery store worker, robotics engineer, saxophonist (clothing pack only), TV news camerawoman
2019	25	Aircraft engineer, association football (soccer) coach, astrophysicist, cake baker, chef, chicken farmer, dentist, doctor, dog daycare owner, entomologist, fashion model, figure skating coach, flight attendant, gymnastics coach, musician, music teacher, judge, news anchor, photojournalist, pilot, pizza chef, polar marine biologist, pop singer, school teacher, swimmer, wildlife conservationist
2020	26	Art teacher, boxer, business executive (clothing pack only), campaign manager, campaign fundraiser, chef, coffee shop worker, construction worker (clothing pack only), doctor, farmer (playset), fashion model, food truck operator, gymnast, hockey player, musician (clothing pack only), noodle bar worker, Olympic climber, Olympic karate, Olympic skateboarder, Olympic softball player, Olympic surfer, park ranger, pediatrician, pet groomer (clothing pack only), tennis player, volleyball player
2021	27	Astronaut, bakery chef, beach snack stand worker, business executive, doctor, figure skater (clothing pack only), firefighter, florist, hair stylist, hockey player, keyboardist, lifeguard, music producer, Olympic swimmer, paramedic, pasta chef, pilot (clothing pack only), restaurant owner, rhythmic gymnast, rock star, school teacher (clothing pack only), science teacher, smoothie bar worker, veterinarian, violinist (clothing pack only), wilderness guide, zoologist
2022	23	Actress, artist, association football (soccer) player, biologist, chef (clothing pack only), Chief Sustainability Officer, conservation scientist, elementary school teacher, farmer, farmer's market stall owner, fashion designer, fashion model, figure skater, interior designer, make-up artist, marine biologist, musician, para alpine skier, pet photographer, pilot, renewable energy engineer, snowboarder, tennis player
2023	24	Association football (soccer) player, astronaut, coach, dentist, fashion boutique owner, figure skater, general manager, gymnast, lifeguard, livestock veterinarian, math teacher, panda rescuer, pastry chef, pop star, referee, singer, sports reporter, stylist, swimmer, tennis player, United States President, violinist, volleyball player, wardrobe stylist
2024	22	Actor, animal rescuer, art therapist, astronaut, ballerina, basketball player, biochemist, boxer, cheerleader, cinematographer, coffee shop worker, dentist, farmer, film director, film studio executive, firefighter, golfer, livestock veterinarian, pediatrician, preschool teacher, pop singer, United States Presidential candidate
2025	14	Astronaut, ballroom dancer, dentist, doctor, figure skater, flight attendant, hockey player, pediatrician, pilot, preschool teacher, rock star, snowboarder, tour manager, veterinarian
2026	9	Association football (soccer) player, donut shop owner, gamer, figure skater, paleontologist, pizza chef, race car driver, robotics engineer, scientist
