= Gender pay gap in the United States tech industry =

Differences in pay between men and women

The gender pay gap in the United States tech industry is the divergence in pay between men and women who work in areas such as software engineering. In 2018, reports show that for every dollar the average man made, women only made 82 cents, and women from underrepresented communities earn even less. Despite applying for the same jobs at the same companies, women receive job offers that pay less than their male counterparts 63% of the time. The gap does not affect women of all races equally, and discourages women, specifically those that are underrepresented minorities, from continuing to pursue opportunities in the technology industry. The wage gap in the tech industry is a result of a multitude of factors including lower initial offers and lack of negotiations.

== Pay gap factors ==
Women under 25 earn 29% less than their male counterparts, but this percentage reduces to 5% for employees over the age of 50. The advent of the personal computer introduced additional barriers to entry for women as the marketing of personal computers was primarily directed at young boys. This marketing strategy led to computers being associated with men, which played a role in associating computer-based jobs with men rather than women. This decline in female participation led to women having fewer female role models and colleagues than their counterparts did in the past. The lack of representation also make it easier for negative stereotypes to permeate workplace cultures.

Historically, women were better represented in technical industries "back when technologist jobs were considered menial, akin to typists". Emma Goldberg, a fellow at the University of Cambridge Centre for Gender Studies, points to hiring criteria developed by male executives that sidelined women as the industry became more profitable. Studies have also pointed to occupational segregation as a mechanism that limits access to high-paying fields and career growth within a profession.

Parenthood is identified as a factor. Mothers between the ages of 25 and 44 are less likely to be in the labor force, and those who are working tend to work fewer hours on average, leading to a reduction in earnings. This is identified as the motherhood penalty, and links to increase in pay for fathers, which is known as the fatherhood bonus.

Wharton professor Janice Bellace points to "outdated American laws" as a contributing factor, pointing to debates over comparable worth in the 1980s: "the U.S. Supreme Court just basically said no [because of] the way Title VII is written. So, we have an old-fashioned statute".

The pay discrepancy continues to manifest itself as careers proceed, and once women begin making less than men, it continues throughout their careers. A study performed by the Economic Policy Institute further found that men with college degrees make more per hour than women with an advanced degree.

=== Race ===
The wage gap exists for women of all racial and ethnic backgrounds, but the size of the gap differs between different races. Among white, black, Asian, and Hispanic workers, Asian men and white women compare the most favorably to white men. Black and Hispanic women have the largest gap of any of the surveyed groups, which indicates that race plays an important role in the wage gap.

Currently, minorities are underrepresented in the interview process at 6%, and they receive lower salary offers. However, Hispanic and black men still receive higher offers than their female counterparts of the same race. Without considering the intersectionality of an individual, firms may correct for race or gender inequities at the expense of other circumstances. Correcting just for race may perpetuate situations in which black and Hispanic men continue to make more than their female counterparts, while correcting exclusively for gender may allow white women to earn more than all groups but Asian and white men. Corrections that avoid binaries can help to reduce siloed hiring practices that attempt to fix one issue at a time rather than a multifaceted approach.

== Legislation ==
=== California Fair Pay Act ===
In 2016, California passed the California Fair Pay Act that prevented employers from asking job applicants about their prior salary. The act also required employers to provide a pay range for the job they are seeking upon request. The law was designed to close the pay gap that existed between men and women in California at the time. After the law was passed, an additional study undertaken by the state found a pay gap of 20.5% between female and male state employees. State assembly representative Jim Cooper criticized these discrepancies, saying: "Female chiefs of staff make less than their male counterparts — that's just plain wrong".

=== Icelandic Fair Pay Act ===
Members of the tech industry have pointed to Iceland as an example of how to implement law that effectively pays women and men equally for the same positions in organizations. At the beginning of 2018, the new law went into place and "is believed to be the first of its kind in the world and covers both the private and public sectors." Unequal pay has been illegal in Iceland since 1961, but new law shifts the proof of fair pay from employers to employees. Iceland has instituted laws in the past to attempt to rectify the pay gap, and despite having "the best track record on gender equality in the world," the laws had not been successful in creating equal pay for equal work. Companies with over 25 employees will be reviewed every three years to confirm that they are paying men and women equally for equal work, and if they are not in compliance they will receive daily fines until they have reached compliance. While the law is intended to fix specifically gender inequity the lawmakers believe that it can also be applied for other marginalized groups such as race and sexual orientation.

== Gender-based pay disputes ==
=== Google ===
In 2017, a spreadsheet was distributed amongst Google employees that detailed the discrepancy in pay between male and female employees. Tech companies have continued to garner more importance and sway in the economy of the United States, but despite 'open cultures' there is a growing fear that "Silicon Valley has established itself as the boys' club of the west, just like how Wall Street has established itself as the boys' club of the East." The reported pay gap led to a lawsuit filed against Google claiming that women who work as engineers, managers, sales, and early childhood education positions are systematically paid less than men at the company. Google has been proactive in responding to the critiques and conducted a comprehensive audit of their organization to attempt to rectify the pay gap in the company. Their internal research concluded that 228 employees were underpaid and raised their compensation, which resulted in a $270,000 cost for Google.

== Skepticism ==
Skeptics of the wage gap claim that statistics are manipulated to present the data in a way that benefits the argument of a gender wage gap. Skeptics further assert that the gap is a result of women's choice to not pursue jobs that pay the same rate as their male counterparts, which skews the data to create a bigger gap than actually exists. The gap is rationalized by highlighting that men choose more dangerous jobs or higher paying fields that allow for them to advance their earning potential. Research that disputes the existence of a gender pay gap highlights the choices women might make to pursue lower-paying jobs than their male counterparts. Skeptics also feel it is not the job of employers to create representative hiring pools. Skeptics acknowledge that cities such as Los Angeles report that in tech interview candidate pools women are underrepresented by 29%, but believe that women may self select themselves out of certain jobs. The lack of representation inhibits women from earning the same salaries within organizations because they are not hired at the same rate, and when they are hired are less likely to negotiate salary. Studies performed in 2023 counter this last point, finding that "the widespread narrative that women don't ask is outdated".
