= Fatherhood bonus =

Wage advantage for fathers compared to non-fathers

Fatherhood bonus or fatherhood premium refers to the advantages that working fathers get in terms of pay and perceived competence in comparison with working mothers and childless men. Fatherhood bonus occurs due to the belief that fathers have greater work commitment, stability and deservingness. On the other hand, mothers are perceived as exhausted and distracted at work, thereby perceiving them to be less productive. An alternative explanation for the fatherhood bonus is that men who are fathers strive harder at work in order to provide for their families (psychological transition upon fatherhood); the psychological transition for women upon motherhood can be explained as putting children as higher priority than work which would explain the motherhood penalty. The fatherhood bonus is highest for married, white college graduates with professional jobs. Among Brits aged 42, fathers receive 21% wage bonus compared to non-fathers of the same age. This wage bonus has increased from 12% in 1958 to 21% in 2016.

== See also ==
- Motherhood penalty
