= Gay wage gap =

Hetero- and homosexual income difference

The gay wage gap is the pay gap between homosexuals and heterosexuals. In the United States, men in same-sex marriages have a significantly higher median household income ($141,900) than both opposite-sex married couples ($124,900) and gay women in same-sex marriages ($113,000) due to the gender pay gap. Individual gay men earn 10% more than straight men with similar education, experience and job profiles, and individual gay men who are married have a significantly higher median income than heterosexual married men. However, because of the gender pay gap, married same-sex female couples make less than heterosexual married couples.

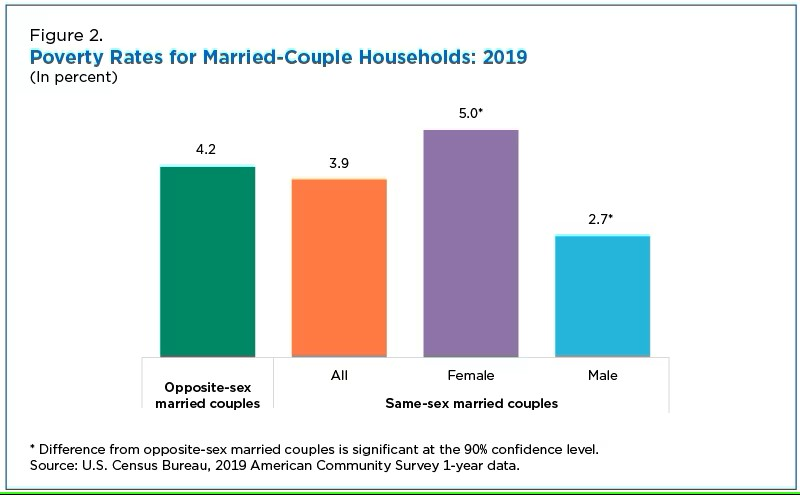
In the US, married gay couples are the least likely to live in poverty compared to married heterosexual couples and married lesbian couples.

The economic advantages gay men experience in the US is most striking in poverty rates. Among married households, 2.7% of gay men live in poverty, while 4.2% of opposite-sex married couples live in poverty. Without men's salaries to account for, 5% of same-sex female couples live in poverty.

US Census data has found that the wage advantages same-gender couples have over different-gender couples—being dual earners, having higher education and living in urban areas—did not benefit same-gender female couples in the way they did male couples.

== Phenomenon ==
Full-time employed gay men earn, on average, 10 percent more than straight men.

Kirk Snyder, professor at the USC business-school, noted that gay people are better entrepreneurs. Gay managers have a 25% higher level of employee engagement. In the 2013–2015 National Health Surveys analysed by Christopher Carpenter and Samuel Eppink, they found that gay, full-time employed men made, on average, 10% more than similarly employed straight men even when controlling for various other factors.

== Wage discrimination by country ==
=== Netherlands ===
Gay men are economically advantaged in the Netherlands. Same-sex male couples have the highest combined income from work or business, the so-called primary income. Their average gross annual income is 15 thousand euros higher compared to opposite-sex couples. The incomes of lesbian and straight couples are more or less the same.

=== Germany ===
Taking into account age, education, and industry, gay men earn less than heterosexuals even though they tend to be better educated than the average population.

=== Australia ===
An Australian study has shown that gay men earn 13% less than their straight counterparts. Meanwhile, lesbians earn 13% more than straight women. La Nauze, economist at University of Melbourne, noted: "There are grounds for concern that workers in Australia, particularly gay men, are discriminated against because of their sexual orientation."

=== United States ===
A study of the 2013–15 National Health Interview Surveys found that gay, full-time employed men made, on average, 10% more than similarly employed straight men. The same study showed that lesbians received a pay premium of 9%. Bisexual men and women earned less than both gay and straight counterparts.

== Wage discrimination by orientation ==
=== Gay women ===
Gay women make a median of 1.4% more than heterosexual women, but make 25.6% less than heterosexual men. Results gathered from the 2002 National Survey of Family Growth show that 24.1% of lesbian and bisexual women in the United States were in poverty, compared to 9.3% of heterosexual women in the same year. In 2013, a study based on multiple contemporary population surveys indicated that lesbian and bisexual women in the United States are slightly more likely to be in poverty than their heterosexual counterparts: between the ages of 18 and 44, 29.4% of bisexual women and 22.7% of lesbian women were experiencing poverty, compared to 21.1%% of heterosexual women. These findings were not considered to be statistically significant due to small sample sizes. But, lesbians still earn less than the regular household income of a heterosexual couple because of the gender wage gap. As a result, lesbian couples/households are more likely to live in poverty than heterosexual couples/households. Thus, gay women in relationships are disadvantaged because their income is totally composed of women's salaries.

Men earn more than women in most occupations, and this inequality plays out regardless of sexual orientation. In fact, in Badgett's 2009 review, some studies showed that while lesbians earned more than heterosexual women, they made less than straight and gay men.

=== Gay men ===
Gay men earn the highest median income. Gay male married couples earn a median income of $141,900, compared to heterosexual married couples ($124,900) and gay female married couples ($113,000).

== Related phenomena ==
In 2022 the non-profit organization National Endowment for Financial Education (NEFE) surveyed LGBT adults in the United States regarding their experiences with financial services. Of those surveyed, 30% "have experienced bias, discrimination or exclusion by or from organizations or individuals within the financial services sector". Transgender respondents in particular experienced discrimination from financial services: 57% of transgender respondents reported facing discrimination or bias, as compared to the 23% of cisgender men and 26% of cisgender women respondents who also reported discrimination or bias.

The same NEFE study from 2022 also found that 60% of the LGBT people surveyed reported that they "lived paycheck to paycheck" in the United States. In a previous NEFE study published earlier the same year, 47% of all U.S. Americans surveyed reported "typically living paycheck to paycheck", regardless of LGBT status.

In 2018 Freddie Mac published a consumer research report which found that LGBT households in the United States were notably less likely to own a home than heterosexual households. Only 49% of LGBT households owned their home, while the national rate for the U.S. is 64.3%.
