= Alice Agogino =

American mechanical engineer (born 1952)

Alice M. Agogino
- Born: December 1, 1952; Albuquerque, New Mexico
- Education: University of New Mexico; University of California, Berkeley; Stanford University
- Scientific career
- Fields: Mechanical Engineering
- Workplaces: University of California at Berkeley; University of Santa Clara, California

Alice Merner Agogino (born 1952) is an American mechanical engineer known for her work in bringing women and people of color into engineering and her research into artificial intelligence, computer-aided design, intelligent learning systems, and wireless sensor networks.

In 1997, Agogino was elected as a member to the National Academy of Engineering for applications of artificial intelligence and for reform efforts in engineering education.

== Early life and education ==
Agogino attended the University of New Mexico for her undergraduate education, and earned her bachelor's degree in mechanical engineering in 1975. Agogino was the only female mechanical engineering student in her 1975 graduating class.She earned her master's degree three years later from the University of California, Berkeley. Her doctoral work concerned engineering and economic systems and was conducted at Stanford University. She earned her Ph.D. there in 1984.

== Career and research ==
Agogino began her career while still an undergraduate with a stint as a project engineer for Dow Chemical from 1972 to 1973. While working on her master's degree and during the first year of her doctoral studies, she was a mechanical engineer and systems specialist at General Electric. She founded her own company in 1979, Agogino Engineering, which still exists. In 1980, Agogino spent a year as a systems analyst for SRI. From 1980 to 1981 she led the Santa Clara University's Women in Engineering program. Agogino was made an assistant professor in mechanical engineering at the University of California, Berkeley in 1984; she is now the university's Roscoe and Elizabeth Hughes Professor of Mechanical Engineering. In her career, she has placed emphasis on the advancement of minority female researchers, mentoring 23 doctoral students (17 from minority backgrounds) and 82 master's level students (36 minority).

From 1995 to 1999 she was the associate dean of Berkeley's College of Engineering, and from 1999 to 2001 she was the director of its Instructional Technology Program. She has been funded by the National Science Foundation to work with Synthesis, a program that encourages engineering education at the undergraduate level. She has been on professional committees for the National Science Foundation, the National Research Council, and the National Academy of Engineering. Her current research is focused on sustainable technology and AI/Robotics for Good. In 2017, at age 64, she co-founded Squishy Robotics, Inc., a company that develops sensor robots and drones which are designed to aid first responders during emergencies. She currently serves as the Chief Executive Officer (CEO) of Squishy Robotics, Inc.

== Honors and awards ==
Agogino is a fellow of several scientific societies, including the National Academy of Engineering (1997), the American Association for the Advancement of Science, the Association of Women in Science, and the American Society of Mechanical Engineers. She is a lifetime member of the Society of Women Engineers and the Institute of Electrical and Electronics Engineers. Agogino has published over 300 peer-reviewed scientific journals throughout her career.

She has also received a number of awards:

- Presidential Young Investigator Award, NSF (1985)
- Young Manufacturing Engineer of the Year, Society of Manufacturing Engineers (1987)
- Director's Award for Distinguished Teaching Scholars, NSF (2004)
- Chancellor's Award for Advancing Institutional Excellence, Berkeley (2006)
- Professor of the Year, Pi Tau Sigma Berkeley (2011)
- Lifetime Mentoring Award, AAAS (2012–2013)
- Presidential Award for Excellence in Science, Mathematics & Engineering Mentoring (2018)
- 2020 Athena Award for Academic Leadership. The award was presented on March 6, 2020, at the Reimagining Cybersecurity for All Symposium in Berkeley.
- 2023 named to the Forbes 50 over 50 list.
