= Motherhood penalty =

Impact on working mothers

The motherhood penalty (also known as child penalties) refers to the economic disadvantages women face in the workplace as a result of becoming mothers. This sociological concept highlights how working mothers often experience wage reductions, diminished perceived competence, and fewer career advancement opportunities compared to their childless counterparts. Studies indicate that mothers face a per-child wage loss that exacerbates the gender pay gap. In addition to lower pay, mothers are often viewed as less committed and less dependable employees, leading to hiring biases, lower job evaluations, and reduced chances for promotion. These penalties are not limited to a single cause but are rooted in societal perceptions, workplace biases, and theories like the work-effort model, which posits that caregiving responsibilities reduce mothers' work productivity. The motherhood penalty is prevalent across various industrialized nations and has been documented across racial and economic lines, with women of color and those in low-wage jobs experiencing more severe consequences. Despite increased attention to this issue, the penalty has not shown significant signs of decline.

== Causes ==
=== Wage gap ===
The most frequently hypothesized explanation of the motherhood wage penalty is that childbearing and childrearing disrupt formal education and on-the-job training. However, evidence suggests that educational and training differences between mothers and non-mothers do not entirely explain the penalty for motherhood. The wage gap is not a universal percentage across the US. It varies by state and occupation. It is less prominent in teaching and nursing roles. However, in construction, for example, the wage gap becomes more drastic and even more so for African American women and Latina women. If these women become mothers, their wage gap become more significant as they are then faced time off of work and barriers in the resources and policies that their company has in place.

=== Sole mothers vs partnered mothers ===
When compared it is shown that sole mothers experience not only more financial hardship but they also lack positive psychosocial interaction and social support in the workforce. Sole mothers also experience an increased likelihood of health complications. Sole mothers face more obstacles when sustaining a job due to their increased risk of missing work due to challenges in finding quality, reliable, and affordable child care.

=== Age impact ===
Age plays a large role in the strength of the effects on a mother caused by the motherhood penalty. A study revealed that the effects of motherhood are strong at a younger age and are eventually weakened when the mother reaches her 40s or 50s. Therefore, if a mother chooses to have children at a younger age, her career may be more affected by the penalty than mothers who choose to wait until after their career has been established. Women who have children at the beginning of their careers have to make greater accommodations in their lives such as cutting back on education, taking more time off, and pass up on more promotions. These choices may have a longer lasting effect on the course of a woman's career than having children after being satisfied in a steady job. Having children at a young age reinforces the idea of motherhood as a status of choice and may reflect to an employer that the woman chooses motherhood over a career.

=== Status characteristics theory ===
A theoretical claim advanced in the performance expectations and evaluations of workplace competence is that motherhood is a "status characteristic". Status characteristic theory defines a status as a categorical distinction among people such as a personal attribute (e.g., race, gender, physical attractiveness) or role (e.g., motherhood, manager, level of education), that has a cultural understanding or belief attached to it. Status characteristics associate greater status worthiness and competence in some distinctions than with others, and they become notable when the characteristic is believed to be directly relevant to the task at hand.

The theoretical construct linking status characteristics, such as race or gender, to differences in behaviors and evaluations is "performance expectations". According to this theory, people implicitly expect more competent task performances from those with more valued status characteristics, and as a result, the people expected to offer more competent performances are evaluated more positively and are given more opportunities. The central idea of the theory and empirical research is that ability standards are stricter for those with lower performance expectations or devalued status characteristics. Since performances of lower status actors (mothers) are critically scrutinized, even when "objectively" equal to that of their high-status counterparts (non-mothers), they are less likely to be judged as competent in demonstrating task ability.

Status characteristics Theory claims that the standard used to evaluate workers is systematically biased in favor of high-status groups. If motherhood is a devalued status in the setting of a workplace, mothers will be judged with harsher standards than non-mothers; therefore, will have to present greater evidence of their competence.

=== Motherhood as "status of choice" ===
Discrimination against mothers also stems from beliefs about control, choice, and autonomy. The concept of choice leads people to perceive disadvantaged individuals as responsible for their own condition, regardless of the social circumstances or unfair application of the disadvantage. In the context of discrimination against mothers in the workforce, beliefs about choice and control affect the penalties associated with becoming a mother. In the past, most women eventually became mothers. Today, more and more women are not becoming mothers largely due to the pursuit of career aspirations and educational goals by women. Therefore, motherhood is increasingly viewed as a choice that women have the freedom to make. Since motherhood is seen as a choice, employers view mothers as choosing children over their work. When a situation, such as motherhood, is perceived as controllable, the moral judgment associated with that perception leads to discrimination. Consequently, mothers who are perceived as having more control over their status as mothers are penalized more than mothers who are perceived as having less control. An experiment done on hiring practices showed that mothers are discriminated against more strongly, in terms of hiring and salary recommendations, when understandings of choice were primed.

=== Normative discrimination ===
Normative discrimination stems from descriptive and prescriptive stereotyping. Descriptive stereotypes are widely shared beliefs about different traits and abilities men and women possess. Due to descriptive stereotypes, men are assumed to be intelligent and assertive, which are qualities often associated with leadership and workplace achievement. Women are assumed to possess greater communal qualities and helping behavior such as warmth, empathy, and selflessness. Discrimination based on descriptive stereotypes occurs when women are seen as unfit or insufficiently competent to perform a stereotypical male job. While descriptive stereotypes influence beliefs about what men and women can do, prescriptive and proscriptive stereotypes influence beliefs about what men and women should or should not do to follow societal norms. The expectations of an ideal employee and an ideal parent are influenced from the past when men composed the majority of the workforce while women were often confined to household duties and childcare. Benard and Correll conducted a study that found mothers are still currently discriminated against even when they prove their competence and commitment. They discovered that evaluators viewed highly successful mothers as less warm and more interpersonally hostile than comparable workers who are not mothers. Stereotypical gender role expectations cause many challenges for mothers who are reentering the workplace. Since women are thought of as more caring, they are often expected to be the primary caregiver. When women break this stereotype, they are liked less because they are violating the prescriptive stereotypes about women as mothers.

Mothers in the American culture are impacted by normative social influence leading them to believe that they are supposed to prioritize the needs of dependent children above all other activities. By this definition, a "good mother" will direct all of her time and energy toward her child, and therefore be a less committed and less productive worker. The cultural norm that mothers should always be there for their children coexist in tension with the normative belief of the "ideal worker" should always be there for his or her employer. These normative conceptions of an "ideal worker" and a "good mother" create a cultural tension between the motherhood role and the committed worker role. These conflicting roles can lead employers to engage in normative discrimination, in which they recognize the competence of mothers but believe that it is their duty to remain at home with their children. This perception of mothers penalizes them on two of the three interpersonal ratings, being seen as less likable and warm compared to their non-mother and father peers in the workplace.

== Criticism ==
=== Work-effort theory ===
This is the most prominent theory seen across all research done on this topic. This is another possible explanation of the motherhood penalty. The work-effort theory concentrates on the productivity of the workers. This approach states that the wage penalty faced by mothers may be due to actual productivity differences between mothers and non-mothers. Productivity differences can occur if taking care of children leaves mothers with less energy to exert at work. Additionally, mothers may also be less productive at work because they are saving their energy for their "second shift" at home. Lower wages for women with children may reflect the choices made by mothers, like trading more flexible hours for lower wages. However, it also may reflect employer bias and discrimination. For example, the difference in how employers handle benefit packages and full-time work requirements.

== Effects ==
The effects of motherhood penalty can be more or less severe on a mother depending on the variables of how old the mother is and also how many children the mother is raising. Younger mothers who are just entering the workforce may suffer more severe consequences than older mothers who have already contributed to the workforce. Women who have more children are also more likely to have to sacrifice more in their work lives and therefore leave themselves open to suffer greater career setbacks related to the motherhood penalty. The motherhood penalty can cause a negative impact of working women's health due to their expectation to be the primary caregiver at home for their children and the stress of proving themselves as dedicated at work and producing quality work. The motherhood penalty describes how mothers suffer severe wage and hiring disadvantages in the workplace. The status of motherhood has important ramifications on hiring, promotion, and salary processes. Depending on their status, studies have found that under the age of 35, the wage gap between mothers and non-mothers was even larger than the wage gap between men and women.

=== Wage penalty for motherhood ===
Motherhood penalty is significant to the gender wage gap because studies found that employed mothers are the women that account for most of the gender wage gap. Research shows that hourly wages of mothers are approximately 5% lower (per child) than the wages of non-mothers. The Research by Sigle-Rushton and Waldfogel found that 81% of mothers with children under the age of 18 made less than $40,000 per year compared to only 44% of fathers. Wage penalty incurred by women for motherhood varies significantly across nations as do work-family policies. Therefore, it is unclear if variations in motherhood wage penalties are linked to specific work-family policies. In the Netherlands for instance, the Dutch Bureau for Economic Policy Analysis estimated that the child penalty for women is 43%, mostly because mothers would reduce their working hours. Women in lower wage jobs suffer a greater percentage of loss in hourly wages as a result of motherhood than women in more highly paid professions.In a five-year time window, the child penalty for women in Finland is 25%. This is in the same range as in a similar situation in Sweden, where the child penalty for women is 26%, and in Denmark, where the child penalty for women is 21%.

=== Hiring penalty for motherhood ===
Mothers are less likely to get hired than non-mothers. Correll, Benard, and Paik created a study that looked at the hiring practices and preferences of employers. Through the evaluation of hypothetical resumes from two applicant profiles that were functionally equivalent. Their resumes were both very strong and when presenting these resumes, no one preferred one applicant over the other and they were seen as equally qualified. Next, a memo mentioning that the applicant was a mother of two children was added to one of the profiles. When participants were asked if they would hire these applicants, participants said they would hire 84 percent of the women without children, compared with only 47 percent of the mothers. These findings showed that mothers are 79 percent less likely to be hired. Participants offered non-mothers an average of $11,000 more than mothers. An audit study also showed that prospective employers were less likely to call back mothers for interviews than non-mothers.

In another experiment, participants evaluated application materials for a pair of same race, same gender job applicants who were equally qualified but differed on parental status. Relative to other kinds of applicants, mothers were rated as less competent, less committed, less suitable for hire, promotion, and management training, and deserving of lower salaries. Mothers were also held to higher performance and punctuality standards. The study results showed that mothers are 100% less likely to be promoted because mothers are assumed to be less competent and committed than women without children.

=== Motherhood vs. fatherhood ===
Several recent studies have shown a wage penalty against maternity leave in the United States. Men do not suffer this penalty. Men's wages are either unaffected or even increase after having a child. A study by a Stanford sociologist Shelley Correll found that employers perceived mothers as less competent than childless women, and also perceived childless men as less competent and committed than men who were fathers. In fact, the researcher found that fathers are 1.83 times more likely to be recommended for management than childless men, a difference that is marginally significant. For female applicants, childless women are 8.2 times more likely than mothers to be recommended for management This difference between mothers and fathers is partly due to cultural norms about gender roles and mechanisms present in the market that create disadvantages for mothers from reduced bargaining power or employer discrimination.

== Reconciliation policies ==
There have been many welfare policies that attempt to resolve the effects of the motherhood penalty. Reconciliation policies include policies such as paid or unpaid parental and family leave, childcare policies supporting subsidized or state-provided care, and flexible work-time policies. Reconciliation policies aimed at improving economic opportunity and equality of mothers should focus on lifting the time constraints on women and changing social norms of gender roles. Theoretically, work-family reconciliation policies should give mothers (and fathers) the opportunity to advance in the workplace, while also ensuring that their families receive adequate care. While all reconciliation policies may support work-family balance, these policies draw upon different assumptions about women's roles in society, and therefore may lead to diverse outcomes regarding equity.

An alternative to welfare policies is a fundamental rights approach, where a child holds the fundamental constitutional right to both care and financial support from both parents on an equal basis, unless the parents expressly agree otherwise (or adoptive parent(s) assume such responsibilities). As paternity has become more and more inexpensive to prove and as more and more evidence comes in on the benefits to children from shared earning/shared parenting, the fundamental rights approach is gaining more credence and becoming easier to establish as a legal matter. One example of this is the United Kingdom, which has a parental responsibility concept in the law that requires parents to meet the needs of children, such as a right to a home and a right to be maintained. The law does not see children as having a right to care by both biological parents as a default matter. Instead it holds responsible all mothers but only (a) married fathers (for any child born to the father's wife) and (b) unmarried fathers who assert such responsibility in an agreement with the mother or by court order. It also states that all parents have financial responsibility for their children. The law has not been amended since paternity testing became more inexpensive.

=== Welfare policies ===
Joya Misra, Michelle Budig and Stephanie Moller did a study looking at the consequences of these different welfare strategies. The study focuses on welfare state regime strategies with an emphasis on work/family reconciliation policies meant to help men and women reconcile their roles as workers and parents. The study looks at the effects of these strategies on labor force participation rates, wage rates, and poverty rates, analyzing the effects of motherhood and marital status on labor force participation rates, annual earnings, and poverty rates. They argue that four major strategies that have appeared:

1. Primary Caregiver/Secondary Earner Strategy: Where women are treated primarily as carers, and secondarily as earners, focuses on valuing the care engaged by women.
2. Primary Earner/Secondary Caregiver Strategy: Where women are treated primarily as earners, and secondarily as carers, focuses on encouraging women's labor market participation.
3. Choice Strategy: Where women are treated primarily as earners, and secondarily as carers) focuses on providing support for women's employment, but also gives women the choice of emphasizing caregiving young children.
4. Earner-Carer Strategy: Where women are treated as equally involved in both earning and caring, focuses on helping men and women balance care and work through support for care both inside and outside of the home.

The study suggests that the earner-carer strategy is most effective at increasing equity for the widest array of women. In this strategy, motherhood is associated with the least negative effects on employment, as well as on poverty levels. The researchers do acknowledge that a range of other policies such as tax policies, unemployment insurance, family allowances, child support, housing subsidies could also be shaping the outcomes.

=== Leave policies ===
Leave policies are intended to support parental caregiving while enabling employment continuity. Leave length impacts employers' perceptions of mothers' employability and mothers' earnings. Moderate leaves reduce pay gaps by ensuring women remain attached to their workplace while children are infants; however, leaves that are too short or too long increase pay gaps because they are linked to decreases in employment continuity and earnings.

- Maternity leave in the United States: A temporary period of absence from employment granted to mothers immediately before or after childbirth.
- Parental leave: An employee benefit that provides paid or unpaid time off work to care for a child.
- Family and Medical Leave Act of 1993: The FMLA was intended "to balance the demands of the workplace with the needs of families."

== See also ==
- Double burden
- Employment discrimination
- Family wage
- Fatherhood bonus
- Glass ceiling
- Maternal wall
- Occupational segregation
- Occupational sexism
- Time bind
- Women in the workforce
- Working parent
